= Soad Hosny filmography =

Appearances by the Egyptian actress

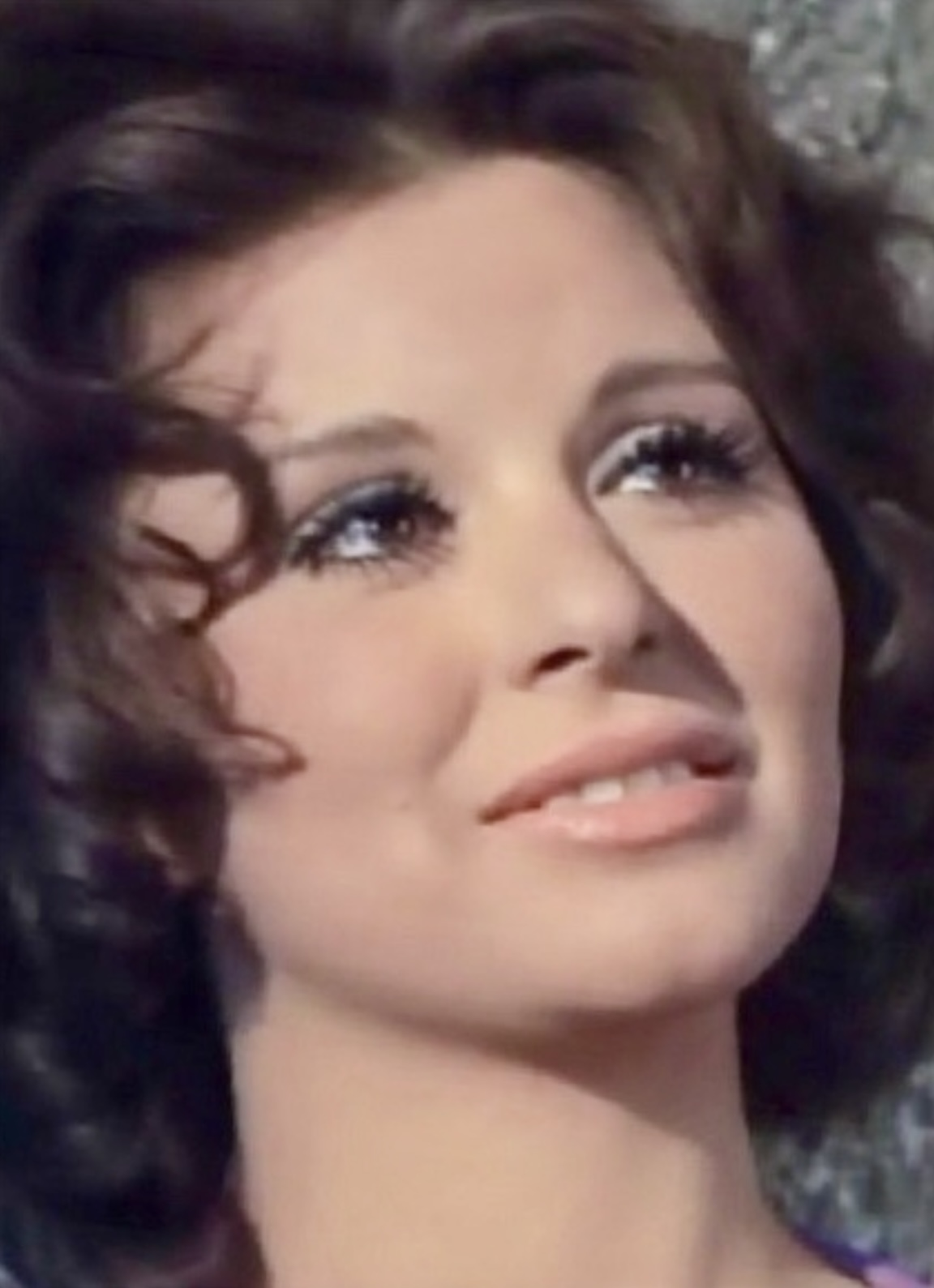
- Hosny in 1972
- Film: 91
- Television series: 1
- Radio show: 12
- Theatre: 1

Soad Hosny (Egyptian Arabic: سعاد حسني, pronounced [soˈʕæːd ˈħosni]; January 26, 1943 – June 21, 2001) was an Egyptian actress born in Cairo, Egypt. She was known as the "Cinderella of the Screen" and one of the most influential actresses in Middle East and the Arab world.

== Feature films ==
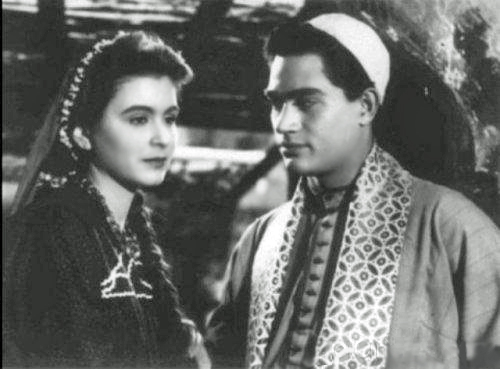
Soad Hosny in her film debut with Muharram Fouad in Hassan and Nayima (1959)

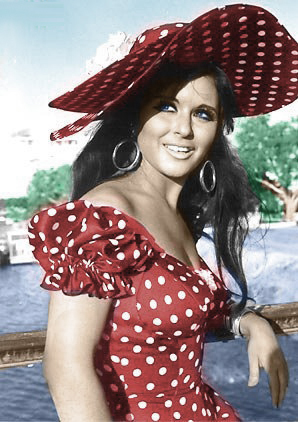
Publicity still for That's What Dad Wants (1968)

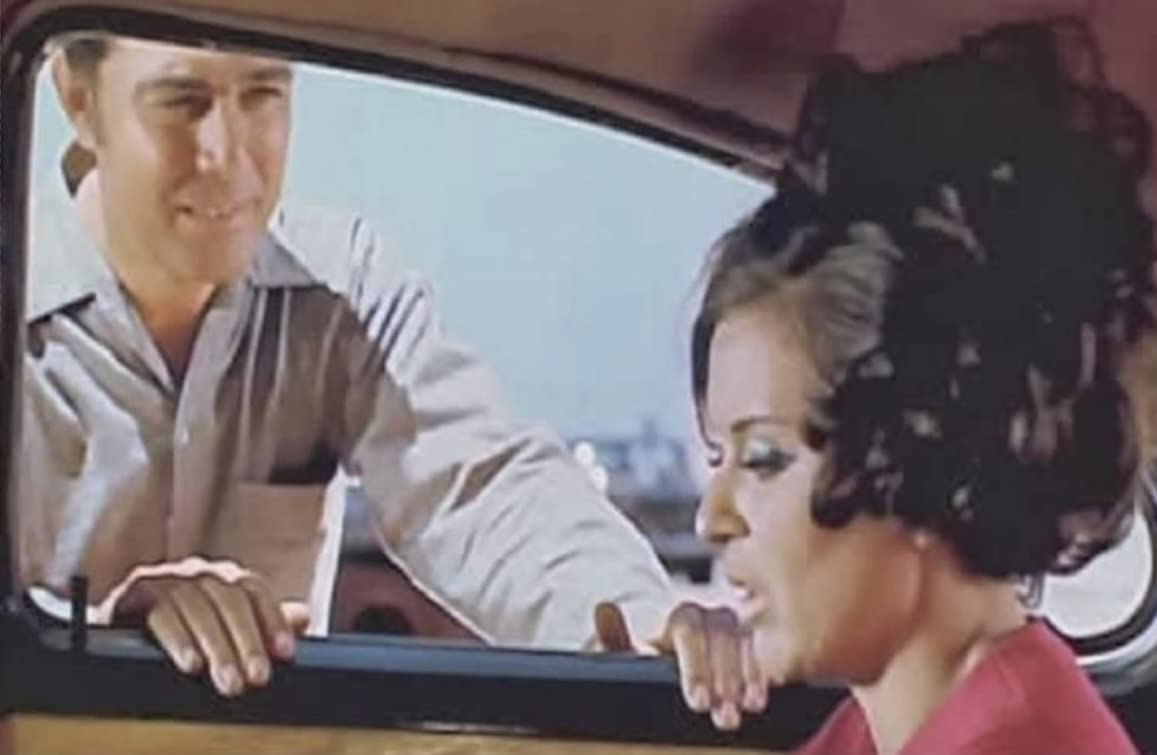
With Salah Zulfikar in Those People of the Nile (1972)

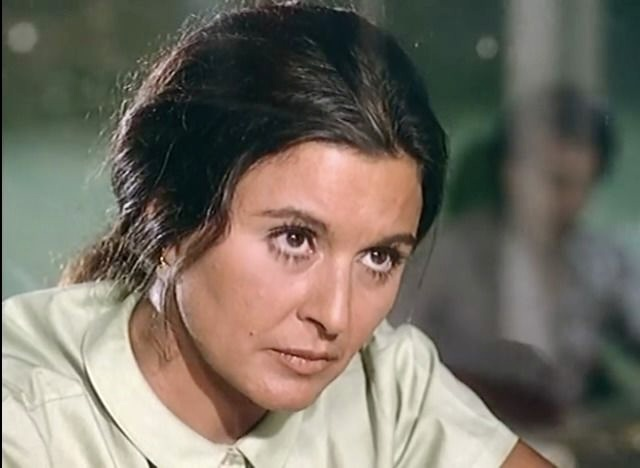
In People on the Top (1981)

Year	Title	Arabic Title	Role	Notes
1959	Hassan and Na'ima	Hassan wa Nayima, حسن و نعيمه	Na'ima	
1960	The Girls in Summer	El Banat Wa El Seif, البنات و الصيف	Samiha	
1960	Money and Women	Mal Wa Nesaa, مال و نساء	Nei'mat	
1960	Gharameyyat Emra'a		Amina	
1960	Thalathat Regaal W Emra'a		Thorya	
1960	Esha'et Hob		Samiha	
1961	Mafish Tafahom		Leila	
1961	El-Do' el-Khaft		Nawwal	
1961	Talat rigal wa emraa			
1961	Lemaza A'aish		Nabila	
1961	H-3	هه٣	Samiha	
1961	El-Safeira Aziza		Aziza	
1961	El-Sabaa' Banaat		Salwa	
1961	A'az El-Habayeb		Kawthar	
1962	Mn Gheir Me'aad		Salwa	
1962	Seraa' Maa' el-Malaa'eka		Nagwa	
1962	Ghosn el-Zaytoon		Atyaat	
1962	El-Ashkyaa' el-Talata		Mervat	
1962	A Date at the Tower	Maww'ed Fil-borg, موعد فى البرج	Amaal	
1963	Shaa'awet Banaat		Ammaal	
1963	Aylet Zizi		Sanaa'	
1963	El-garema el-Dahka		Leila	
1963	Ser el-Hareba		Horyah	
1963	El-Saheira el-Saghera		Hanya	
1964	Hekayt Gawaz		Adeila	
1964	The Game of Love and Marriage	Le'bet el-Hob wa el-Gawaz	Amira	
1964	El-Ozab el-Talata		Elham	
1964	The Groom Arrives Tomorrow	El-Arees Yasel Ghadan, العريس يصل غداً	Samira	
1964	Awwel Hob		Donia	
1964	El-Morahekan		Nahed	
1964	The Search	El-Taree, الطريق	Elham	
1964	For Men Only	Lel-Regal Faqat, للرجال فقط	Salwa	
1966	Fares Bani Hemdan		Naglaa'	
1966	Sha't el-Talaba		Mona	
1966	Too Young To Love	Saghera A'la el-Hob, صغيره على الحب	Karima / Sameiha	
1966	Mabka el-Oshak		Sekina	
1966	Leilet el-Zefaf		Salwa	
1966	His Excellency, The Ambassador	Ganab el-Safeer, جناب السفير	Hoda	
1966	El-Talta Yhbonha		Eiman	
1966	El-Moghamroon el-Talta		Mona	
1966	Shaa'awet Regala		Fareda	
1966	Cairo 30	Al-Qāhira 30, القاهره 30	Ehsan	
1967	The Second Wife	El Zoga El Tanya, الزوجه التانيه	Fatma	
1967	Shabab Magnon Geddan		Madeha / Esmat	
1967	El-Leka' el-Tani		Hoda	
1967	El-Set el-Nazra		Hoda	
1968	The Student and the Teacher	El-Tlmeza we el-Ostaz,التلميذة والأستاذ	Salwa	
1968	Marriage the Modern Way	El-Zawag a'la el Tareeqa el-Hadeesa, الزواج على الطريقة الحديثة	Noha	
1968	Nar el-Hob		Nadia	
1968	Helwa we Sha'ia		Aziza / Nosa	
1968	The Tale of Three Girls	Hekayt 3 Banat, حكاية 3 بنات	Shahira	
1968	Hawaa' we el-Kerd		Nadia	
1968	That's What Dad Wants	Baba Ayez Keda, بابا عايز كده	Nadia	
1969	Something of Torment	Shei' mn el-Azab, شىء من العذاب	Salwa / Ammal	
1969	Show Girl	Fatat el-esta'rad, فتاة الإستعراض	Fayza	
1969	Nadia		Nadia / Mona	
1969	The Well of Deprivation	Be'r el-Herman, بئر الحرمان	Nahed / Mervat	
1970	Sunset and Sunrise	Ghroob we Shrooa, غروب و شروق	Madiha	
1970	The Lost Love	El-Hob el-Daa'ea, الحب الضائع	Leila	
1971	The Choice	El-Ekhtyaar, الإختيار	Sherifa	
1971	My Wife and the Dog	Zawgaty Wal Kalb, زوجتى و الكلب	Soad	
1972	Those People of the Nile	El-Nas we el-Neil, الناس و النيل	Nadia	
1972	The Fear	El-Khoof, الخوف	Soad	
1972	Watch Out for ZouZou	Khalli Balak Min ZouZou, خلى بالك من زوزو	ZouZou / Zeinab	
1973	Strangers	Ghrobaa, غرباء	Nadia	
1973	El-Hob elazi kan		Maha	
1974	Where Is My Mind?		Ayda	
1974	Amira...My Love	Amiraa...Hobi Ana, أميرة حبى أنا’	Amira	
1975	Whom Should We Shoot?	Alā Mann Notlīq Ar-Rasās, على مَن نطلق الرَصاص؟	Tahani	
1975	Karnak	El-Karnak, الكرنك	Zeinab	
1979	The Savage	El-Motwhesha, المتوحشة	Bahya	
1979	Shafika and Metwali	Chafika et Metwal, شفيقه و متولى	Chafika	
1981	Al Qadisiyya		Shereen	
1981	The Suspect	Al-Mashbouh, المشبوه	Fatma / Bata	
1981	A Dinner Date	Maowid ala ashaa, موعد على العشاء	Nawwaal	
1981	People on the Top	Ahl el-Qema, أهل القمة	Seham	
1982	A Stranger at My Home	Ghareeb fi Baity, غريب في بيتى	Afaf	
1983	Love in a Jail Cell	Hob fel-Znzana, حب فى الزنزانة	Fayza	
1984	Afghanistan, Why?	Afghanistan Lemaza, أفغانستان، لماذا؟	Afghani woman	
1986	The Bird of the East	Asfour el-Shark, عصفور الشرق	Reem	
1986	The Hunger	Al-Go'a, الجوع	Zebida	
1988	The 3rd Class	El-Daraga El-Talta, الدرجه الثالته	Nea'na'aa	
1991	The Shepherd and the Women	Al-Ra'i wal Nisaa, الراعي والنساء	Wafaa'	(final film role)

== Television series ==
Year	Title	Arabic Title	Role	Notes
1985	Howa wa heya	Howa Wa Hiya هو و هى	Heya	

== See also ==
- Lists of Egyptian films
