= Nadia Al-Gindi =

Egyptian actress and producer

- نادية الجندي
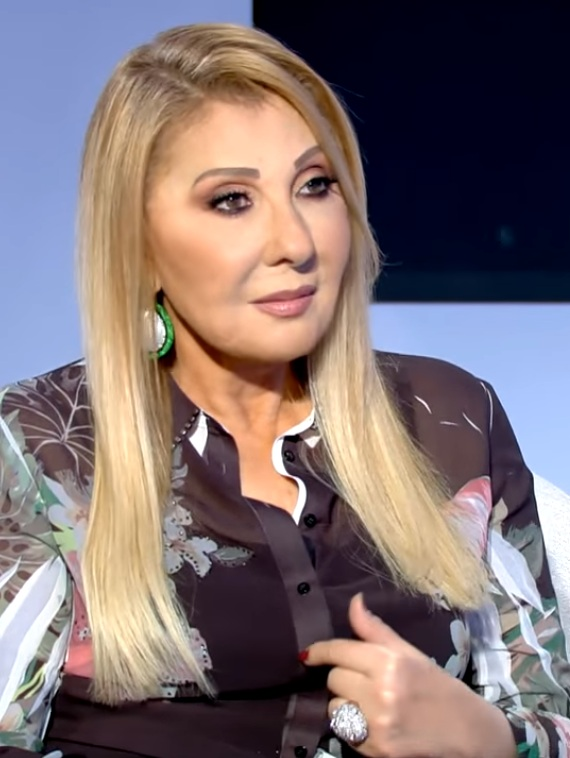
- Nadia Al-Gindi, guest of MTV Lebanon, 2 March 2020
- Born: Nadia Muhammad Abd al-Salam al-Gindi; March 24, 1946 (age 80); Alexandria, Kingdom of Egypt
- Occupation: Actress
- Years active: 1958–2020
- Spouses: Emad Hamdy (m. 1962; div. 1975) Mohammed Mokhtar (m. 1978; div. 1995)
- Children: 1

Nadia Elgendi (Also written as Nadia El Gendi; Arabic: نادية الجندي) (born 1946 in Khta Alexandria) is an Egyptian actress and producer. She is often known in Egypt as "Negmet El gamaheer" (the star of masses) because of the high commercial success of her movies in the 1990s. Through her still on-going 6-decades career, she has appeared in 61 movies and 7 TV shows. She is most recognized for her femme fatale roles and spy movies related to Egyptian-Israeli conflict and patriotic issues after 1952 revolution, such as El Gasousa Hekmat Fahmy (1994), Mohemma Fi Tel Aviv (1992). Also, she is known for various crime movies, ranging from vulgar drug dealer in Egyptian suburbs to a professional thief.

== Career ==
=== 1958–1980 ===
Started her work in cinema after winning in a beauty contest in Cairo which gained her debut 1958 in a small role in Youssef Chahine's historical movie about the French colonialism in North Africa, Gamila with prominent actors Magda and Salah Zulfikar. In the sixties, she had many various small roles, such as her role in the romance, A Storm of Love with Salah Zulfikar and Nahed Sherif in 1961 and Too Young for Love with Soad Hosny and Rushdy Abaza in 1966. In early 1970s played the role of Zaghaga, a local drug dealer, in TV soap opera al-Dawwama (The Whirlpool), besides Mahmoud Yassin and then-young Mahmoud Abdel Aziz, the series was very popular and was produced for theaters. In 1974 she earned more recognition when she produced her own movie, Bamba Kashar, in which she played the role of the real 20th belly dancer of the same name, it was directed by Hassan El Imam as quite similar to his typical melodrama characteristics, also contained many songs and dances performed by El Gendy, the movies starred her then-husband, Emad Hamdy, and notably despite the screening permits faced longtime problems, it had had very wide success in theaters for many weeks.

From 1980 to 1984, she starred in different commercially successful movies and some of them were well-received by many critics, such as the role of Neama't Allah in Wekalet El Balah, which is scripted by Nobel prize laureate Naguib Mahfouz, which she appeared as a very strong boss in old rural part in old Cairo and has her own warehouse, but she falls in love with a newly appointed worker and then marries him, which gives glimpses of the struggle between her rigor personality and the weakness resulted and affected by love, leading the character to explore ecstasy, jealousy and revenge. In El-Batneyya, named after another popular Egyptian area, she's starred beside prominent actors including Farid Shawki, Ahmed Zaki and Farouk El Feshawi.

=== 1990s ===
Nadia El Gendy has collaborated with director Nader Galal in nine movies starting with Jabarowt Emraa (A Woman's Might) in 1984 and ending with Amn Dawla in 1999, El Gendy appeared as an intelligent agent (or double agent) in most of the works, or roles with significant femme fatale characteristics, also many were low-budget. In A'sr El Quwwa (Age of Power), played a different role she hasn't done before, as she was an aspiring recently-graduated lawyer and daughter of a billionaire who is involved along with his family in many crime and illegal activities, the movie is significantly influenced by The Godfather trilogy.

=== 2000s–2010s ===
The last film she has appeared in is Aly Badrakhan's Al-raghba in 2001, beside Ilham Shaheen and Yaser Galal in, a film loosely based on A Streetcar Named Desire. Since then, she has only participated in four soap operas but in leading roles: Zeinat, Man Atlak al-nar A'la Hend Allam? (Who shot Hend Allam?), Maleka fi el-Manfa (Queen in Exile), and Asrar (Secrets).

In September 2018, El Gendy announced on her official Instagram account that she will star in a new spy role after nearly two decades of the last similar role she had done.
