= List of Egyptian submissions for the Academy Award for Best International Feature Film =

Best International Feature Film submissions from Egypt
- Formerly called: United Arab Republic (1958–1961)

Highlights
- Debut: 1958
- Submissions: 40
- Nominations: none
- Oscar winners: none

Egypt has submitted films for consideration for the Academy Award for Best International Feature Film (Note: The category was previously named the Academy Award for Best Foreign Language Film, but this was changed to the Academy Award for Best International Feature Film in April 2019, after the Academy deemed the word "Foreign" to be outdated.) since 1958, when Youssef Chahine's Cairo Station became both the first African and the first Arab film to contend for the award. The award is handed out annually by the Academy of Motion Picture Arts and Sciences to a feature-length motion picture produced outside the United States that contains primarily non-English dialogue.

As of 2026, Egypt has submitted forty films, but has never been nominated.

== Submissions ==
The Academy of Motion Picture Arts and Sciences has invited the film industries of various countries to submit their best film for the Academy Award for Best International Feature Film since 1956. The International Feature Film Committee oversees the process and reviews all the submitted films. Following this, they vote via secret ballot to determine the five nominees for the award.

Submissions between 1958 and 1960 were submitted under the name of the United Arab Republic, which was the formal name of Egypt at the time.

All films submitted are primarily in Arabic. Below is a list of the films that have been submitted by Egypt for review by the academy for the award by year.

| Year (Ceremony) | Film title used in nomination | Original title | Director | Result |
As United Arab Republic (1958–1961)
| 1958 (31st) | Cairo Station | باب الحديد | Youssef Chahine | Not nominated |
| 1959 (32nd) | The Nightingale's Prayer | دعاء الكروان | Henry Barakat | Not nominated |
| 1960 (33rd) | Teenagers | المراهقات | Ahmed Diaeddin | Not nominated |
As Egypt (since 1961)
| 1961 (34th) | Love and Faith | وا إسلاماه | Enrico Bomba, Andrew Marton | Not nominated |
| 1962 (35th) | Chased by the Dogs | اللص والكلاب | Kamal El Sheikh | Not nominated |
| 1964 (37th) | Mother of the Bride | أم العروسة | Atef Salem | Not nominated |
| 1965 (38th) | The Impossible | المستحيل | Hussein Kamal | Not nominated |
| 1966 (39th) | Cairo 30 | القاهرة 30 | Salah Abu Seif | Not nominated |
| 1970 (43rd) | The Night of Counting the Years | المومياء | Shadi Abdel Salam | Not nominated |
| 1971 (44th) | A Woman and a Man | امرأة و رجل | Houssam Eddine Mostafa | Not nominated |
| 1972 (45th) | My Wife and the Dog | زوجتي و الكلب | Said Marzouk | Not nominated |
| 1973 (46th) | Empire M | إمبراطورية ميم | Hussein Kamal | Not nominated |
| 1974 (47th) | Where Is My Mind? | أين عقلي | Atef Salem | Not nominated |
| 1975 (48th) | I Want a Solution | أريد حلاً | Said Marzouk | Not nominated |
| 1976 (49th) | Whom Should We Shoot? | على من نطلق الرصاص | Kamal El Sheikh | Not nominated |
| 1979 (52nd) | Alexandria... Why? | إسكندرية... ليه؟ | Youssef Chahine | Not nominated |
| 1981 (54th) | People on the Top | أهل القمة | Ali Badrakhan | Not nominated |
| 1990 (63rd) | Alexandria Again and Forever | اسكندرية كمان وكمان | Youssef Chahine | Not nominated |
| 1994 (67th) | Land of Dreams | أرض الاحلام | Daoud Abdel Sayed | Not nominated |
| 1997 (70th) | Destiny | المصير | Youssef Chahine | Not nominated |
| 2002 (75th) | A Girl's Secret | أسرار البنات | Magdy Ahmed Ali | Not nominated |
| 2003 (76th) | Sleepless Nights | سهر الليالى | Hany Khalifa | Not nominated |
| 2004 (77th) | I Love Cinema | بحب السيما | Osama Fawzy | Not nominated |
| 2006 (79th) | The Yacoubian Building | عمارة يعقوبيان | Marwan Hamed | Not nominated |
| 2007 (80th) | In the Heliopolis Flat | في شقة مصر الجديدة | Mohamed Khan | Not nominated |
| 2008 (81st) | The Island | الجزيرة | Sherif Arafa | Not nominated |
| 2010 (83rd) | Messages from the Sea | رسائل البحر | Daoud Abdel Sayed | Not nominated |
| 2011 (84th) | Lust | الشوق | Khaled El Hagar | Not nominated |
| 2013 (86th) | Winter of Discontent | الشتا إللى فات | Ibrahim El Batout | Not nominated |
| 2014 (87th) | Factory Girl | فتاة المصنع | Mohamed Khan | Not nominated |
| 2016 (89th) | Clash | اشتباك | Mohamed Diab | Not nominated |
| 2017 (90th) | Sheikh Jackson | شيخ جاكسون | Amr Salama | Not nominated |
| 2018 (91st) | Yomeddine | يوم الدين | Abu Bakr Shawky | Not nominated |
| 2019 (92nd) | Poisonous Roses | ورد مسموم | Fawzi Saleh | Not nominated |
| 2020 (93rd) | When We're Born | لما بنتولد | Tamer Ezzat | Not nominated |
| 2021 (94th) | Souad | سعاد | Ayten Amin | Not nominated |
| 2023 (96th) | Voy! Voy! Voy! | !فوي! فوي! فوي | Omar Hilal | Not nominated |
| 2024 (97th) | Flight 404 | 404 الرحلة | Hani Khalifa | Not nominated |
| 2025 (98th) | Happy Birthday | هابي بيرث داي | Sarah Goher | Not nominated |
| 2026 (99th) | The Stories | القِصَص | Abu Bakr Shawky | Pending |

== Controversies ==
The Egyptian Academy has been known in recent years for choosing topical films that are controversial at home. Coptic Christians launched an unsuccessful court case against 2004 submission I Love Cinema while dozens of Egyptian parliamentarians and a number of Muslim clerics similarly tried to ban The Yacoubian Building for depicting its depictions of Islamic fundamentalism and particularly homosexuality. 2002's Secret of the Young Girl a drama about teenage pregnancy, and 2003's Sleepless Nights, an examination of sex, divorce and relationships inside and outside of marriage also courted controversy among conservatives in Egypt.

In 2022, Egypt's Oscar Selection Committee announced a shortlist of five films: The Crime by Sherif Arafa, Full Moon by Hadi El Bagoury, Kira & El Gin by Marwan Hamed, 2 Talaat Harb by Magdy Ahmed Ali and Villa 19-B by Ahmad Abdalla. Although Ahmed Ali withdrew his film prior to the vote. On 29 September, it was announced that a majority of the selection committee voted not to enter any of the shortlisted films.

== See also ==
- List of Academy Award winners and nominees for Best International Feature Film
- List of Academy Award-winning foreign language films
