= List of Egyptian films of 1979 =

A list of films produced in Egypt in 1979. For an A-Z list of films currently on Wikipedia, see Category:Egyptian films.

Title	Director	Cast	Genre	Notes
Ehna Btou Al-Autobes (We Are the Bus People)	Hussein Kamal	Adel Emam, Abdel Moneim Madbouly, Saeed Abdel Ghani, Essad Younis	Drama	
Khate’at Malaak (Sin of An Angel)	Yehia El-Alamy	Salah Zulfikar, Nelly, Hussein Fahmy	Fiction	
Shafika we metwally (Shafika and metwally)	Ali Badrakhan	Souad Hosni, Ahmad Zaki	Drama	
Katel Ma Katelsh Had (The Killer Who Killed No One)	Mohamed Abdel Aziz	Adel Emam, Athar El-Hakim, Eman, Omar El-Hariri	Comedy / crime	
Khally Balak Men Geranak (Watch Out Your Neighbors)	Mohamed Abdel Aziz	Adel Emam, Lebleba, Fouad el-Mohandes, Madiha Yousri	Comedy	
Moghameroon Hawl Al-Aalam (Adventurers Around the World)	Mahmoud farid	Adel Emam, Nahed Sherif, Samir Ghanem, Lebleba	Comedy	
Ragab Fawq Safeeh Sakhin (Ragab on a Hot Tin Roof)	Ahmed Fouad	Adel Emam, Nahed Sherif, Saeed Saleh, George Sidhom	Comedy / drama	
