= Karnak Café =

Karnak Café may refer to:

- Karnak Café (novel), a 1974 novel by Naguid Mahfouz
- Karnak Café (film), a 1975 film based on the novel
