= List of Egyptian films of 1991 =

A list of films produced in Egypt in 1991. For an A-Z list of films currently on Wikipedia, see Category:Egyptian films.

Title	Director	Cast	Genre	Notes
Al-Kit Kat	Daoud Abdel Sayed	Mahmoud Abdel Aziz, Sherif Mounir, Aida Reyad	Comedy	
Lu’bat Al-Ashrar (Wicked Game)	Henry Barakat	Salah Zulfikar, Athar El-Hakim	Thriller	
Al-Ra'i wal Nisaa (The Shepherd and the Women)	Aly Badrakhan	Ahmed Zaki, Soad Hosny, Yousra	Drama	
Allaeb Ma'a Alkebar (Playing With the Great)	Sherif Arafa	Adel Emam, Hussein Fahmy	Drama / Comedy	
El Horoub (The Escape)	A. El Tayeb	Ahmad Zaki	Drama	
Mosajal Khatar (Registered Criminal)	Samir Seif	Adel Emam, Salah Kabil	Crime / Comedy	
Shams Elzanaty	Samir Seif	Adel Emam, Mahmoud Hemida, Sawsan Badr	Action / Adventure	
War in the Land of Egypt	Salah Abu Seif			Entered into the 17th Moscow International Film Festival
