= Too Young for Love =

Too Young for Love may refer to:

- "Too Young for Love" (song), a song by Michelle Williams
- Too Young for Love (1953 film), a French-Italian comedy drama film
- Too Young for Love (1966 film), an Egyptian film
