= Karnak (film) =

1975 film

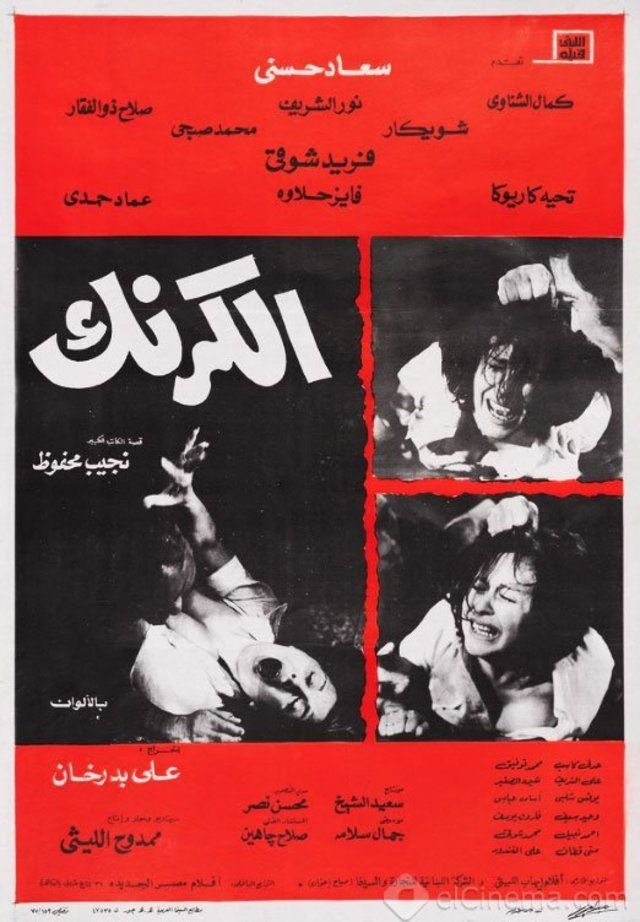
- Theatrical release poster
- Arabic: الكرنك
- Directed by: Ali Badrakhan
- Written by: Naguib Mahfouz
- Screenplay by: Mamdouh El Leithy
- Story by: Naguib Mahfouz
- Based on: Karnak Café
- Produced by: Mamdouh El Leithy
- Starring: Soad Hosny; Nour El Sherif; Salah Zulfikar; Kamal el-Shennawi; Farid Shawqi
- Cinematography: Mohsen Nasr
- Edited by: Said El Sheikh
- Music by: Gamal Salama
- Production company: El-Laithy Film
- Distributed by: Aflam Misr Algadida (local); El-Laithy Film (worldwide)
- Release date: December 29, 1975
- Running time: 140 minutes
- Country: Egypt
- Language: Egyptian Arabic

Karnak (Arabic: الكرنك, translit: Al-Karnak) is a 1975 Egyptian political film based on a novel written by Egyptian writer Naguib Mahfouz with the same name, and directed by Ali Badrakhan and starring Soad Hosny. It includes an ensemble cast that includes Nour El-Sherif, Kamal El-Shennawi, Farid Shawqi, Taheyya Kariokka, Emad Hamdy and Shwikar. The film features Salah Zulfikar in a special appearance as Shoukry the rebellious member of parliament.

The film is listed in the Top 100 films in Egyptian cinema of the 20th century. The film is set against the discussions between the patrons of a café in Cairo, the Karnak Café It follows the stories of three individuals during the 1960s, including the Six-Day War (1967), War of Attrition (1967–70) and ends with victory in October War (1973). Karnak was produced by Mamdouh El-Laiyhy for El-Laithy Film and was released in Egypt on December 29, 1975, by Aflam Misr Algadida, and worldwide release by El-Laithy Film.

== Plot ==
The film tells about the state of media blackout pursued by the Egyptian regime during the 1960s. In the prison, they are forced to confess to crimes they did not commit, and some of them are forced to work as spies for the regime and security services inside the university and to write reports on any activity or opposition thought within the university walls. It also comes to the arrest of members of Parliament, including Member of Parliament Shokry (Salah Zulfikar), who was trying to help Ismail and Zainab to eliminate the tyranny of the security man Khaled Safwan (Kamal El-Shennawi) until he was arrested personally. This caused the rupture of the home front and led to the defeat of Egypt in 1967 war, and the occupation of Israel of Sinai.

The film ends with the revolution of correction at the beginning of the era of President Anwar Sadat and the issuance of a decision to release political detainees, and if the high-ranking officer who was extracting fabricated confessions, then he himself becomes the detainee.

== Staff ==
- Directed by: Ali Badrakhan
- Story by: Naguib Mahfouz
- Screenplay by: Mamdouh El Leithy
- Produced by: Mamdouh El Leithy
- Cinematography: Mohsen Nasr
- Edited by: Said El Sheikh
- Music by: Gamal Salama
- Production company: El-Laithy Film
- Distributed by:
  - Aflam Misr Algadida (local)
  - El-Laithy Film (worldwide)

== Primary cast ==
- Soad Hosny as Zainab, the medical university student.
- Nour El-Sherif as Ismail El Sheikh, the medical university student.
- Salah Zulfikar in a special appearance as Shoukry, the member of parliament oppressed by Khaled Safwan.
- Kamal El-Shennawi as Khaled Safwan, the Director of General Intelligence.
- Mohamed Sobhi as Helmy, the leftist & intellectual university student.
- Farid Shawqi as Diab, Zainab's father.
- Taheyya Kariokka as Zainab's mother.
- Shwikar as Oronfella, owner of Karnak Café and Helmy's girlfriend.
- Emad Hamdy as author Taha El Gharib.
- Mustafa Metwalli as Ismail's colleague.
- Abdel Aziz Makhyoun as Detainee
- Mohamed Tawfik as Hamada, Helmi's father
- Ahmed Bedier as Detainee
- Farouk Youssef as Sisi
- Fayez Halawa as The Scoundrel Informant
- Naima El-Sagheer as Ismail's mother
- Osama Abbas as Housing Representative
- Adly Kasseb as Taha's Strange friend
- Ali El-Sharif as Hasab Allah
- Wahid Seif asOne of Karnak's Clients
- Mohamed Shawky as Sergeant of the Dabbas Neighborhood
- Ahmed Nabil as Hasab Allah's Boy
- Ahmed Abdel Warith as Detainee
- Ali Al-Ghandour as Detainee

== Background and analysis ==
The film is based on the story of the great Egyptian writer Naguib Mahfouz, Karnak Café, which is a short story in which Naguib Mahfouz recorded his objection to political views during the era of President Gamal Abdel Nasser.

Many agreed on the character of Khaled Safwan, the tyrannical security man, who is the embodiment of the character of Salah Nasr, the former director of Egyptian General Intelligence Directorate, who was tried in the case of the famous intelligence deviation in the wake of the setback of 67 and the end of the film with the entry of Khaled Safwan, who is also detained, with an incident with Salah Nasr after his conviction In the case of intelligence deviation and the coup attempt, it is strongly hinted that he is the son of a palace man during the reign of the king, which indicates the continuation of oppression and individualism behind the guise of socialist rule.

Karnak symbolizes the civilized framework of Egypt, which has been shortened in the modern era to the name of a café owned by one of the retired dancers with ties to politicians in the former era and the era of the revolution alike. The pyramid is under the weight of despair, the absence of reason and the desire to die, as if Zainab is a symbol of the youth of Egypt, who were violated, sometimes by oppression in prison, and sometimes by exploiting them in shattered ruins at the hands of the filthy profiteers in despair and absence of reason, and at last in the name of love, where only the debris of pleasure mixed with impurities of oppression and rape remained, in the interpretation of Possible artistry of the three sex scenes of Zainab in the film.

Commenting on Gamal Salama's music: It is noted that the phrase of the military march is repeated, then regressive and complex tones played by the piano whenever the orchestra tries to move the audience's attention, and then at the end, after the October 1973 victory, the sentence is repeated, but more powerful and escalating, which accompanies the victory march.

== Production ==
Minister of Culture at the time, Yusuf Sibai objected to the presence of the leftist intellectual Helmy, played by the actor Mohamed Sobhi, and asked the film makers to clarify that the Sadat regime had nothing to do with the issue of torture that was taking place in prisons in the sixties. The process of adapting the novel and writing the script took about 10 months.

The late superstar Ahmed Zaki was cast for the character of Ismail El Sheikh, and because of the objection of the film's distributor to Ahmed Zaki, he was replaced by the actor Nour El-Sherif. The late superstar Salah Zulfikar agreed to appear for a few minutes in a special appearance as the rebel member of parliament Shoukry who was suppressed by Khaled Safwan. Actor Gamil Ratib was the first candidate for the role of Khaled Safwan. But the strangeness of his accent at that time deprived him of the role that went to actor Kamal El-Shennawi.

After director Ali Badrakhan finished filming, the Presidency of the Republic asked to watch the film, and the filmmakers were asked to end its events with the decisions of the fifteenth of May Corrective Revolution made by President Sadat, in contrast to Naguib Mahfouz's novel, which ends with the setback of 1967.

== Reception ==
Karnak occupies the 39th place in the list of the 100 best films in the memory of Egyptian cinema, according to the critics' poll, on the occasion of the 100th anniversary of the first cinema show in Alexandria (1896–1996)

After Ahmed Zaki was excluded from the film and replaced by Nour El-Sherif, the young talented actor entered a severe depression that almost developed to suicide, and did not overcome the crisis until after Salah Jahin supported him, who was convinced of his talent, and promised him a starring role in front of the same actress, Soad Hosny, which actually happened three years later, with the film Shafika and Metwali, written by Jahin and directed by Ali Badrakhan.

Salah Nasr, the former General intelligence Directorate chief, filed a lawsuit against the film, which he described as insulting the General Intelligence Service and its chief represented in his person through the character of Khaled Safwan, who was embodied by the artist Kamal El-Shennawi. Demand to watch it and achieve record revenues at the time. Nour El-Sherif was exposed to a difficult emotional situation, as his mother died during filming, and the work team had obtained approvals for filming in the Parliament for specific hours and with difficulty, there was no room for delay, so he held himself and completed filming on this day, and among the scenes today was the scene of buying engagement rings with Soad Hosny, who is supposed to appear very happy in front of the camera, despite his great sadness.

== See also ==
- Political cinema
- List of Egyptian films of 1975
