= Poisonous Roses =

2018 film directed by Fawzi Saleh

- Film poster
- Directed by: Fawzi Saleh
- Starring: Mohamed Berakaa
- Release date: 12 April 2018 (BAFICI)
- Running time: 70 minutes
- Country: Egypt
- Language: Arabic

Poisonous Roses is a 2018 Egyptian drama film directed by Fawzi Saleh. It is based on the novel Poisonous Roses for Saqr by Egyptian novelist Ahmed Al-Sheety. It was selected as the Egyptian entry for the Best International Feature Film at the 92nd Academy Awards, but it was not nominated.

== Plot ==
Two siblings living in the impoverished tannery district of Cairo with their mother have a strained, peculiar relationship.

== Cast ==
- Mohamed Berakaa as El-sheikh
- Safaa El Toukhy as The Mother
- Ibrahim El-Nagari as Saqr
- Mahmood Hemaidah as The Magician
- Marihan Magdy as Taheya

== Release and reception ==
The film was presented at the Rotterdam Film Festival in 2018. Jay Weissberg of Variety praised the visuals of the film, but criticized the unevenness of the narrative.

== See also ==
- List of submissions to the 92nd Academy Awards for Best International Feature Film
- List of Egyptian submissions for the Academy Award for Best International Feature Film
