= Doaa al-Karawan (novel) =

1934 novel by Taha Hussein

Doaa al-Karwan
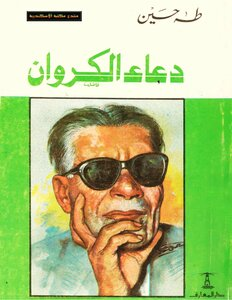
- Author: Taha Hussein
- Language: Arabic
- Publication date: 1934
- Publication place: Egypt

Doaa al-Karwan (Arabic: دعاء الكروان)(The Call of the Curlew) is a novel by Taha Hussein, an Egyptian writer, published in 1934. Taha Hussein dedicated it to the writer Abbas Al-Akkad. The Lebanese poet Khalil Mutran was inspired to write a poem by the atmosphere of the novel. It was notable for containing the first use of flashback narrative in an Arabic-language novel.

The novel was translated into French in 1949. The novel was made into a movie titled The Nightingale's Prayer in 1959, directed by Henri Barakat, with Taha Hussein participating in his own voice at the end of the film. The novel was translated into English in 1980.

== Plot ==
This novel describes the life of Āmina, a Bedouin girl. Along with her mother Zahra and her sister Hanādi, she is shamed and exiled from her hometown by her uncle after her father is killed by "a victim of one of his sinful lusts". The family settles in another village, where they find work: Āmina as a servant to the daughter, Khadija, of a middle-class family, and Hanādi works for an engineer.

Without warning, Zahra and Hanādi become gloomy and depressed. The family is once again suddenly uprooted when Zahra moves them out of the village, much to the confusion of Āmina. After finding shelter with a headman, their uncle who offers to bring them back to their hometown. During the trip, Hanādi is killed by her uncle to preserve the family's "honor". As Āmina watches her sister die, she hears the call of a curlew overhead.

Āmina blames her sister's employer for seducing her and indirectly causing her murder, and vows to get revenge. She returns to Khadija's home as a servant and breaks up the engagement between Khadija and the engineer. Āmina then finds Zannūba, one of the women from the headman's house, who finds her work as a servant. After plotting to get the engineer's current servant fired and to be fired from the family she serves, she is finally hired by the engineer.

Āmina's violent obsession with the engineer morphs into something close to love. She toys with his feelings by refusing to submit to him, but finds herself getting attached to his company. She changes her name to Su'ād. Finally, when he asks to marry her, she tells him about her sister. The engineer reaffirms his desire to marry her, and as the call of a curlew is heard again, he wonders aloud if the cry sounded the same as the cry from when Hanādi was murdered.

== Review ==
Peter Bradshaw commented on the movie based on this novel: "This is an extravagant revenge melodrama, or Beauty-and-the-Beast fable, from the Egyptian film-maker Henry Barakat, based on a novel by Taha Hussein".
