= Sumaya Elalfy =

Egyptian actress (d. 2025)

- Born: July 23, 1953; Sharqia Governorate, Egypt
- Died: December 2025 (aged 72)
- Occupation: Actress
- Spouse(s): Farouk El-Fishawy; Modi Al Imam; Gamal Abdel Hamid; Medhat Saleh

Sumaya Elalfy (July 23, 1953 - December 2025) was an Egyptian theatre, television and film actress.
