= Whom Should We Shoot? =

1975 film

- Directed by: Kamal El Sheikh
- Starring: Soad Hosny
- Release date: 1975
- Running time: 91 minutes
- Country: Egypt
- Language: Egyptian Arabic

Whom Should We Shoot? (Arabic: على من نطلق الرصاص؟, translit.`Alā mann Notlīq Ar-rasās, IPA [ʕælɑ: mʌn nʊtˤlq ərəsˤʌs]) is a 1975 Egyptian drama film directed by Kamal El Sheikh. The film was listed in the CIFF Top 100 Egyptian films and was also selected as the Egyptian entry for the Best Foreign Language Film at the 49th Academy Awards, but was not accepted as a nominée.

== Cast ==
- Soad Hosny
- Mahmoud Yassine
- Magdy Wahba
- Gamil Ratib
- Ezzat El Alaili
- Ahmed Tawfik

== See also ==
- Soad Hosny filmography
- List of Egyptian films of 1975
- List of Egyptian films of the 1970s
- List of submissions to the 49th Academy Awards for Best Foreign Language Film
- List of Egyptian submissions for the Academy Award for Best Foreign Language Film
