= Gamil Ratib =

Egyptian French actor

OME Gamil Ratib
- جميل راتب
- Born: Gamil Abu Bakr Ratib; August 18, 1926; Cairo, Kingdom of Egypt
- Died: September 19, 2018 (aged 92); Cairo, Egypt
- Education: University of France
- Occupation: Actor
- Years active: 1947–2018
- Notable work: Lawrence of Arabia, Whom Should We Shoot?

Gamil Abu Bakr Ratib (Arabic: جميل أبو بكر راتب; 18 August 1926 – 19 September 2018) was an Egyptian and French actor. He appeared in television and film productions and briefly in theater over a 65-year career. He was known for numerous villainous roles and his appearance in the English-language epic historical drama film Lawrence of Arabia.

== Biography ==
Born in 1926 in Cairo to an Egyptian family known of their love for arts, Ratib was sent to study arts in Paris. His love of performance came from French theatre, which he studied at the University of France, before making his film debut in 1945. He was a much-awarded actor in both his native Egypt and in France, having worked in both countries, including being given the Legion of Honour. In France, Ratib married a French woman and was given French citizenship.

== Filmography ==
- 1947: The Lovers of Pont Saint Jean as Un jeune homme au bal (uncredited)
- 1956: Trapeze as Stefan
- 1957: O.S.S. 117 n'est pas mort
- 1957: L'Aventurière des Champs-Élysées as Christian Forestier
- 1961: Deuxième Bureau contre terroristes as Igorian
- 1962: Lawrence of Arabia (by David Lean) as Majid
- 1964: Shadow of Evil as Akhom
- 1964: Male Companion as Le maharadjah (uncredited)
- 1967: To Commit a Murder as Belloum
- 1967: Réseau secret as Ben Salem
- 1968: The Young Wolves as Prince Linzani
- 1973: L'Alphomega (TV Series, by Lazare Iglesis) as Prince Raheem Abdel Rasheem
- 1975: Al kaddab
- 1975: Ala mn notlik Al-Rosas -as Rushdy
- 1978: El-Soud ela al-hawia as Edmund
- 1978: Roadless Traveller
- 1979: Ualla azae lel sayedat -as Tarek
- 1979: Chafika et Metwal (by Aly Badrakhan) as Afandina
- 1980: Shaaban Taht El-Sifr as Abdel Gawad
- 1982: L'Étoile du Nord as Nemrod Lobetoum
- 1983: Hob Fi El-Zinzana as Sharnoubi
- 1984: Al-La'na as Helmy
- 1985: El Terella
- 1985: Genius Number Five
- 1985: Adieu Bonaparte (وداعا بونابرت, Wadaan Bonabart) (by Youssef Chahine) as Barthélémy
- 1985: Ali Bey Mazhar Wal 40 Haramy as Sarhan
- 1985: El-Keif as Selim El-Bahz
- 1985: Sanawat al khatar
- 1986: The Innocent as Dr. Ali Khalefa
- 1986: Al-Bidaya
- 1986: Alaqzam Kademon
- 1987: Kaher el-zaman as Dr. Halim
- 1988: Al-Darga Al-Thalitha (by Sherif Arafa)
- 1990: The Serpent of Death as Omar
- 1991: Poussière de diamant as Si Abbes
- 1992: La dame du Caire
- 1993: La Fortune de Gaspard (TV Movie by Gérard Blain) as Féréor
- 1995: Checkmate Mr. President! as president
- 1995: Toyour elzalam - Roshdy
- 1995: Jusqu'au bout de la nuit (by Gérard Blain) as Rousseau
- 1996: Un été à La Goulette (by Férid Boughedir) as Hadj Beji
- 1996: Afarit el-asphalt
- 1996: Méfie-toi de l'eau qui dort
- 1997: La Nuit du Destin (by Abdelkrim Bahloul) as M. Slimani
- 1998: Gamal Abd El Naser
- 2000: Stand-by as Le médecin
- 2001: El-Rehla as Ez bec
- 2001: Al-saher
- 2005: Zaïna, cavalière de l'Atlas as Récitant / Narrator (voice)
- 2007: Alawela fel Gharam
- 2008: The Aquarium by (Yousry Nasrallah) as Youssef's father
- 2008: Laylat El-Baby Doll as Sgt. Peter
- 2010: Turk's Head (by Pascal Elbé) as Aram
- 2011: Cinématon or not Cinématon as himself
- 2011: Carnet de Dubai Hiver II : Errances aquatiques as himself
- 2011: Carnet de Dubai Hiver IV : L'Eau et le haut as himself
- 2012: Un nuage dans un verre d'eau as M. Noun
- 2018: Hier as Virgile (final film role)

== Theatre ==
- 1960 : Hamlet by William Shakespeare, production by Philippe Dauchez, Maurice Jacquemont, Théâtre des Champs-Elysées
- 1967 : Scheherazade by Jules Supervielle, production by Jean Rougerie, Théâtre des Mathurins

== Honours ==
- Egypt: Grand Cross of the Order of Merit
- France: Knight of the Legion of Honour
- Tunisia: Grand Officier of the National Order of Merit (Tunisia)
