= Mohamed Sobhi (actor) =

Egyptian film, television/stage actor, and director

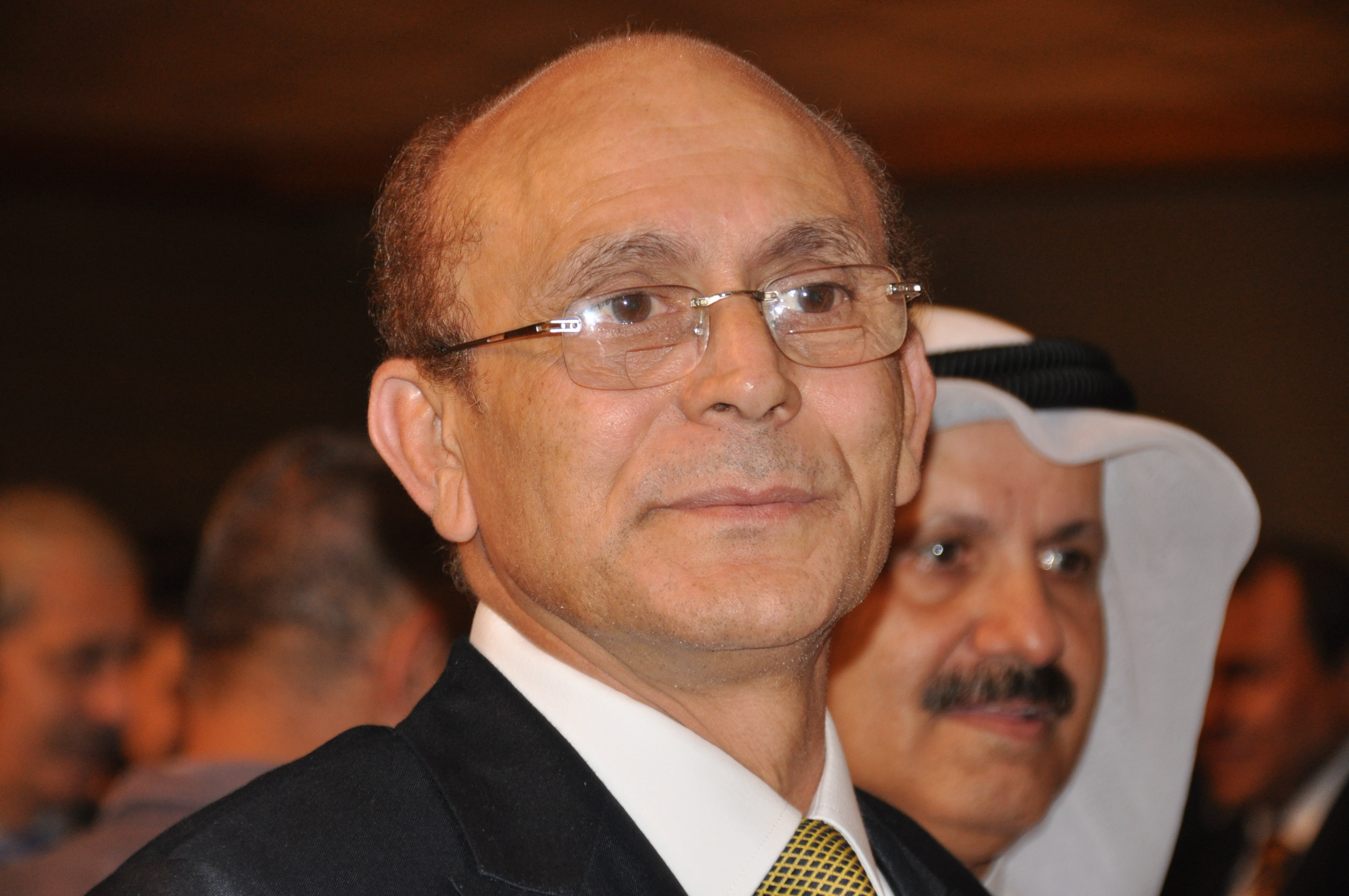
- Mohamed Sobhi in 2010
- Born: Mohamed Mahmoud Sobhi; March 3, 1948 (age 78); Cairo, Egypt
- Other name: Mohamed Sobhi
- Occupations: Actor, theatre director
- Years active: 1975–present

Mohamed Mahmoud Sobhy (Arabic: محمد محمود صبحي; born March 3, 1948) is an Egyptian film, television and stage actor and director, known for several Egyptian movies.

== Early life and education ==
Mohamed Mahmoud Sobhi was born in Cairo. He graduated from the Institute of Drama in 1970 and continued to teach until 1984. His younger brothers are actors Magdi sobhi and Sharif Sobhi.

== Awards ==
- Doctor Soaad ElS abbah for intellectual creativity (1991)
- Honorary Certificate in the Arabic theatre ceremony (1994)
- Best Egyptian Actor (1996,1998)
- Best Egyptian Theatre Actor (1998)
- The Best Actor Golden Lion award (1999-2001)
- The Best Director Golden Lion Award (1999-2001)
- Middle East Best Director (2001)
- Honorary PhD degree from the American University of California (2013)
- Honorary master's degree from the British University of Cambridge (2013)

== Filmography ==
=== Plays ===
- Hello Shalaby
- Comparse El-Mosem (The extra of the season)
- Al-Tha3lab (The Fox)
- Entaha El-Dars Ya Ghabi (The Lesson is Over, Stupid)
- Hamlet
- Ali-Beih Mazhar (Mr. Ali Mazhar)
- Enta Horr (You are free)
- El-Mahzooz (The unstable)
- El-Joker (The Joker)
- El-Hamagy (The Barbarian)
- Takhareef (Superstitions)
- El-Baghbaghan (The Parrot)
- Weg'het Nazar (A Point of View)
- Bel-Araby El-Fasi7 (In Plain Arabic)
- Tabeeb Raghm Anfoh (Doctor Despite His Will)
- Mama America (Mother America)
- A'alat Wanees (The Wanees Family)
- Le'bet El-Set (A Woman's Plaything)
- Sekket El-Salama 2000 (The Road to Safety 2000)
- Carmen/ With a Different Perspective Of Mohammed Sobhy
- Amir Rafik
- Ghazal Al-Banat (Girls Flirting)
- Khebitna (Our Discomfiture)
- nagoum el zohr ( stars in the middle of the day)

=== Selected films ===
- Al Gareeh (The Injured)
- Ali Beih Mazhar (Mr. Ali Mazhar)
- Uncle Zizou Habibi (1977) (My Beloved Uncle Zizou)
- Houna Al-Qahira (Here is Cairo)
- Al Karnak (The Karnak)
- Al-Ameel Rakam 13 (Agent 13)
- Al-Shyatana Alty Ahabatny (The Devil Who Loved Me)
- El Moshagheb 6 (The 6th trouble-maker)
- Batal Mn Al Sa'eed (A Champion from The South)
- Elfloos wel Wohoosh (The Money and The Monsters)
- Moohamy Taht Eltamreen (A Trainee Lawyer)
- Ela'abqary Khamsa (The Genius Number Five)

=== TV series ===
- Ali Beih Mazhar (Mr. Aly Mazhar)
- Rehlet el Melyoon (The Million Journey)
- Sonbol ba3d el Melyoon (Sumbul After the Million)
- Yomyat Wanees (Wanees's Diaries)
- Faris bila Gawad (Cavalier Without A Steed)
- Mal7 el Ard (Salt of the Earth)
- 'Ayesh Fe Al Ghaibooba (Living In A Coma)
- Ana wa Ha'ola' (Me And Those)
- Ragol Ghany Faqeer Giddan (A Very Poor Rich Man)
- Al Nems
- Alam Ghareeb Gedan
- Shamlool
- Kimo

== Controversies ==
Sobhi holds deeply antisemitic views, and created the television series Horseman without a Horse (also translated as Cavalier without a Steed), based on the debunked Russian antisemitic text The Protocols of the Elders of Zion. In an interview which aired on the Egyptian Dream 2 TV on March 8, 2014 (as translated by Israeli founded MEMRI), Sobhi stated that "Benjamin Franklin delivered a speech [in 1787], which became very well known. I myself used it in Horseman without a Horse. [The Americans] saw that a catastrophe was imminent, due to the Satanic ideas of that terrorist group. That was when Franklin delivered his speech to the American people. He said: “I warn you that if these terrorist groups of Jews flock to America, they will control American decision-making within a hundred years. They will control America itself, and will trample us underfoot." Sobhi also argued "You'll see when you read the Protocols of the Elders of Zion."
