= Rania Stephan =

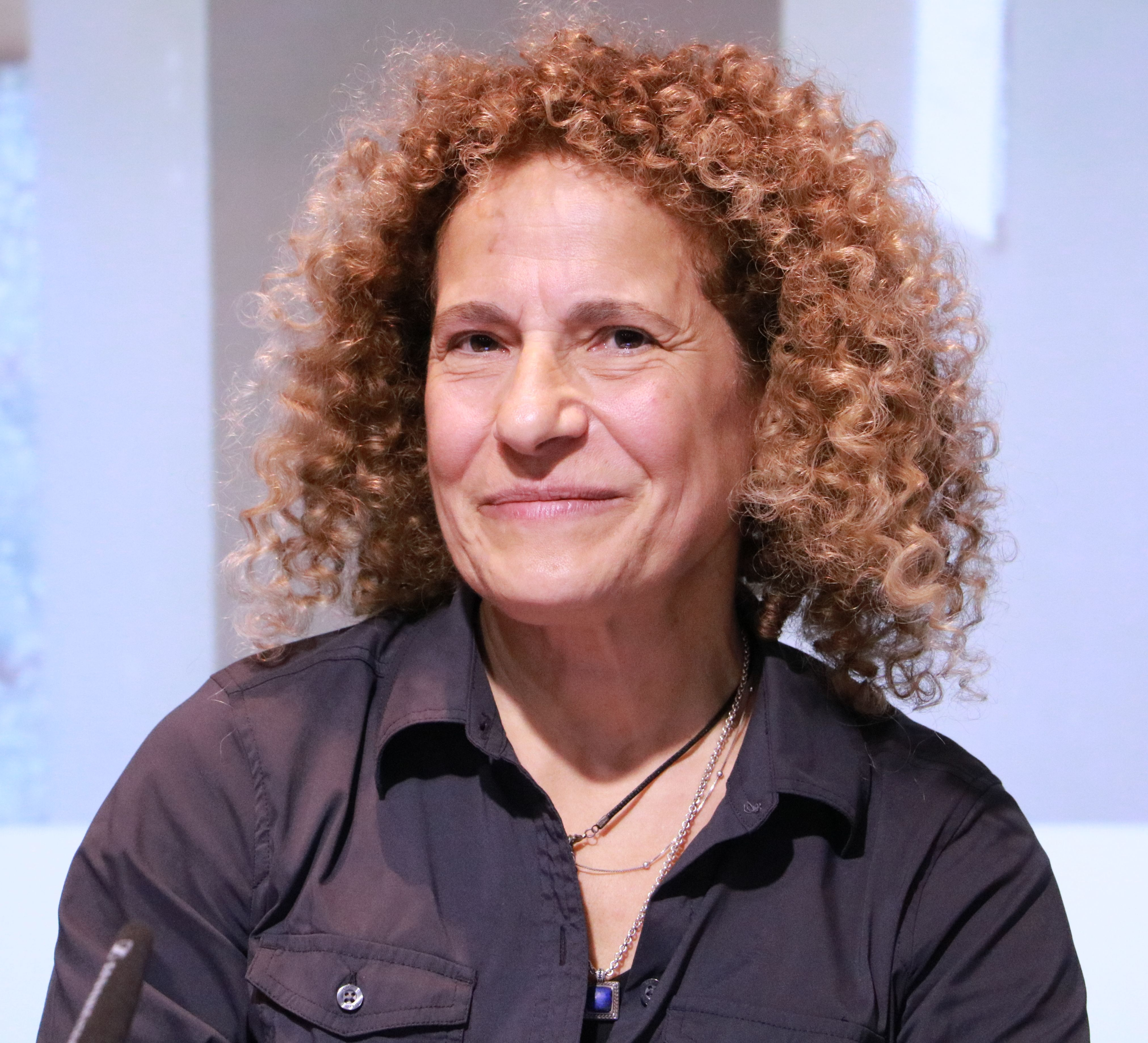
Rania Stephan in 2023

Rania Stephan (Arabic: رانية اسطفان; born 1960) is a Lebanese filmmaker and video artist. She is best known for her first feature film The Three Disappearances of Soad Hosni (2011).

== Early life and education ==
Stephan was born in Beirut, Lebanon. She is fluent in Arabic, French and English. She completed her French Baccalaureate at the French Protestant College in Lebanon in 1978. She then left Lebanon to escape the civil war. She received her bachelor's degree in Cinema Studies from La Trobe University in Melbourne, Australia in 1982 and her master's degree in Cinema Studies from Paris VIII University, France, in 1986. Stephan moved to France in 1983, and returned to Beirut in 2005.

== Career ==
Stephan worked as a camera person, a film editor and a sound engineer. She was also first assistant director to renowned film directors like Simone Bitton and Elia Suleiman. Stephan worked in documentaries and in experimental videos. Her work is influenced by French political cinema.

=== Lebanon/War (2006) ===
Lebanon/War is a documentary about events that occurred during the war between Lebanon and Israel in the summer of 2006 and its aftermath. Stephan took to the streets, met people and recorded their testimonies and thoughts on the war. She then edited the stories into a 47 minute long documentary.

=== The Three Disappearances of Soad Hosni (2011) ===
The Three Disappearances of Soad Hosni is Stephan's first feature film. It is about the Egyptian movie star Soad Hosni. The film is composed entirely of VHS footage of Hosni's films that Stephan edited from pirated materials. The "three disappearances" refer to the mysterious way that Soad Hosni died. Hosni was found dead on the pavement in front of her apartment in London in 2001. Her death was ruled a suicide, despite some rumors claiming that Hosni was murdered. In this film, Stephan focuses on the representation of women, sexual politics and gender relations. The film won the 2011 Best Arabic Documentary Filmmaker Award at the Doha Tribeca Film Festival, was nominated for Best Documentary at the 2012 Chicago International Film Festival and at the 2012 Palm Springs International Film Festival.

== Filmography ==
- Tribe (1993)
- Attempt at Jealousy (1995)
- Baal & Death (1997)
- train-trains (Where’s the Track?) (1999)
- Arrest at Manara (2003)
- Kimo the Taxi (2003)
- Wastelands (2005)
- Lebanon/War (2006)
- Smoke on the water, 7 X El Hermel (2007)
- DAMAGE, for Gaza “The land of Sad Oranges” (2009)
- The Three Disappearances of Soad Hosni (2011)
- Memories For A Private Eye (2015)
- RIOT: 3 Movements (2017)
- Double-Cross (2018)
- Threshold (2018)
- In Fields of Words: Conversations with Samar Yazbek (2022)

== Exhibitions ==
=== Solo exhibitions ===
- Rania Stephan. On Never Being Simply One, Marfa' Projects, Beirut, 2016

=== Group exhibitions ===
- Beirut Lab: 1975(2020) Curated by Juli Carson and Yassmeen Tukan, University Art Gallery, University of California, Irvine, 2019
