= The Nightingale's Prayer =

The Curlew 's Prayer
- DVD cover
- Directed by: Henry Barakat
- Written by: Taha Hussein (novel); Youssef Gohar; Henry Barakat
- Produced by: Barakat Film
- Starring: Faten Hamama; Ahmed Mazhar
- Cinematography: Wahid Farid
- Music by: Andre Ryder
- Release date: 1959
- Running time: 126 minutes
- Country: United Arab Republic (Note: Egypt and Syria were briefly united as a single political entity during the time this film was released.)
- Language: Egyptian Arabic

The Nightingale's Prayer (Arabic: دعاء الكروان, translit. Doaa al-Karawan; also called The Curlew's Cry) is a 1959 Egyptian drama film directed by Henry Barakat and based on a novel titled Doaa al-Karawan (novel) by the prominent writer Taha Hussein. It stars Faten Hamama and Ahmed Mazhar.

In 1996, during the Egyptian Cinema centennial, this film was selected one of the best 100 Egyptian film productions. It received an award of recognition from the Academy of Motion Picture Arts and Sciences and was selected as the Egyptian entry for the Best Foreign Language Film at the 32nd Academy Awards, but was not accepted as a nominee. It was also entered into the 10th Berlin International Film Festival.

== Plot ==
Amna is a young woman that witnesses the death of her older sister by her uncle, who had abandoned her family and left them with no support. She understands from her mother that her sister deserves to die because she has dishonored the family. Amna doesn't agree. She believes that her uncle should be blamed for their conditions. She seeks revenge from the engineer who swayed her sister and lied to her thus causing her death. Amna moves to his house to work as a maid and tries to poison him several times, but all her plans fail. She discovers it's impossible to kill him. This engineer starts to approach her, but she resists him, which makes him even more attracted to her.

The poor girl thinks that by not resisting him anymore and pretending to love him, she would be able to destroy his life. What she doesn't expect is that she herself would fall in love with him. She plans to dig a hole and trick him into falling in it. She tries but fails and both fall in the hole. She faces him with the truth, and reveals who she is. She decides to leave him as she knows that her plans have failed. Her uncle finds out what she has done and decides to kill her because she has ruined the family's reputation. As she steps out of the engineer's house, she sees her uncle and immediately realizes that he has bad intentions, but the engineer sees him too, and takes the bullet in his back to protect her and save her life.

== Cast ==
- Faten Hamama as Amna
- Ahmed Mazhar as the engineer
- Amina Rizk as Amna and Hanady's Mother
- Zahret El-Ola as Hanady
- Abdel Alim Khattab as Uncle Gabber
- Mimi Chakib as Zanooba
- Ragaa Al Geddawy as Khadeeja

== Reception ==
In 2020, Peter Bradshaw of The Guardian named The Nightingale's Prayer as the 19th-greatest African film of all time, calling it "an extravagant revenge melodrama, or Beauty-and-the-Beast fable."

== See also ==
- List of submissions to the 32nd Academy Awards for Best Foreign Language Film
- List of Egyptian submissions for the Academy Award for Best Foreign Language Film

== Notes ==
- "Movie details". Allmovie.
- "Summary". UNC libraries.
- "Film information" (in Arabic). Official site.
- "Film summary". Official site.
- "Film summary" (in Arabic). Adab wa Fan.
