= A Date at the Tower =

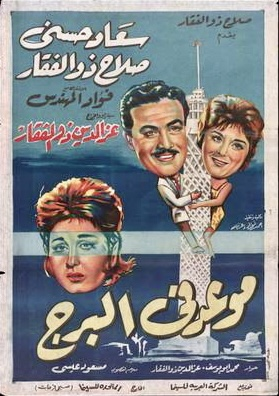
- Film poster
- Directed by: Ezz El-Dine Zulficar
- Written by: Ezz El-Dine Zulficar; Mohammed Abu Youssef
- Produced by: Salah Zulfikar
- Starring: Salah Zulfikar; Soad Hosny; Fouad El-Mohandes
- Cinematography: Masood Issa
- Edited by: Hussein Ahmed; Abdel Aziz Fakhry
- Production company: Salah Zulfikar Films Company
- Distributed by: Arab Company for Cinema
- Release date: 12 December 1962 (Egypt)
- Running time: 110 minutes
- Country: Egypt
- Language: Egyptian Arabic

A Date at the Tower (Arabic: موعد في البرج, translit. Maw’ed fi Elborg, aliases: Rendezvous in the Tower or Appointment in the Tower) is a 1962 Egyptian film written and directed by Ezz El-Dine Zulficar. It stars Salah Zulfikar, Soad Hosny and Fouad el-Mohandes. The film was released on 12 December 1962 in Egypt by Arab Company for Cinema.

== Synopsis ==
Adel and Amaal meet while they return from a cruise. Love binds them, they pledge to marry after six months and that the date will be at the Cairo Tower. They plan to seize Amaal's fiancé's money. Adel decides to look for an honorable job. He works a small job in a hotel and becomes a deputy manager. At the same time, Amaal leaves her fiancé. She is dismissed from her job as a hostess because of her brother Alaa's crimes. Six months end. The police storms Alaa's apartment, who gets killed in the end. Adel and Amaal meet in the Cairo Tower on time.

== Crew ==
- Director: Ezz El-Dine Zulficar
- Writer: Ezz El-Dine Zulficar, Mohamed Abu Youssef
- Producer: Salah Zulfikar
- Cinematography: Masood Issa
- Production studio: Salah Zulfikar Films Company
- Distribution company: Arab Company for Cinema

== Cast ==
- Salah Zulfikar as Adel Refaat
- Soad Hosny as Amaal
- Fouad el-Mohandes as Hassan
- Soraya Helmy as Ship passenger
- Zain El-Ashmawy as Alaa
- Samia Rushdi as Khadija Hanim
- Helmy Halim as Mamdouh
- Mahmoud Farag as Madbouly El-Eter
- Eileen Gaber as Moushira Hanim
- Edmond Toima
- Ahmad Shawqi
- Zainab Sedky
- Zaki Ibrahim
- Salah Al-Masry
- Hassan Atleh
- Ahmed Shokry

== See also ==
- Salah Zulfikar filmography
- Soad Hosny filmography
- List of Egyptian films of the 1960s
