= People on the Top =

1981 film

- Directed by: Ali Badrakhan
- Screenplay by: Mostafa Muharram
- Story by: Naguib Mahfouz
- Produced by: Abdel Azeem El-Zoghby
- Starring: Soad Hosny; Nour El-Sherif; Ezzat El Alaili
- Cinematography: Mohsen Nasr
- Edited by: Saeed El Sheikh
- Music by: Gamal Salama
- Production company: Abd Al-Azeem Al-Zoghby Films
- Distributed by: Shafei Films
- Release date: 11 May 1981 (Egypt)
- Running time: 117 minutes
- Country: Egypt
- Language: Egyptian Arabic

People on the Top (Arabic: أهل القمة, translit.Ahl el qema) is a 1981 Egyptian drama film based on a story by Naguib Mahfouz and directed by Ali Badrakhan. It stars Soad Hosny, Nour El-Sherif and Ezzat El Alaili. The film revolves around the Infitah that took place in the 1970s and its impact on Egyptian society through the enrichment of a pickpocket through the Infitah and smuggling of goods through customs. A police officer refuses to allow the pickpocket to marry his sister and seeks to trap him.

People on the Top is listed in the top 100 Egyptian films. The film was selected as the Egyptian entry for the Best Foreign Language Film at the 54th Academy Awards, but was not accepted as a nominee.

== Synopsis ==
The thief Zaatar works for Zaghloul, the owner of an import and export company. Zaghloul takes advantage of Zaatar's capabilities and assigns him tasks related to smuggling goods from customs. Zaatar falls in love with Siham, the sister of the police detective Muhammad, which angers Muhammad. Zaatar becomes independent from Zaghloul and begins his rivalry with him. Zaghloul proposes to marry Siham, and Muhammad welcomes him. Zaghloul reveals his truth to him, but he does not believe him.

== Cast ==
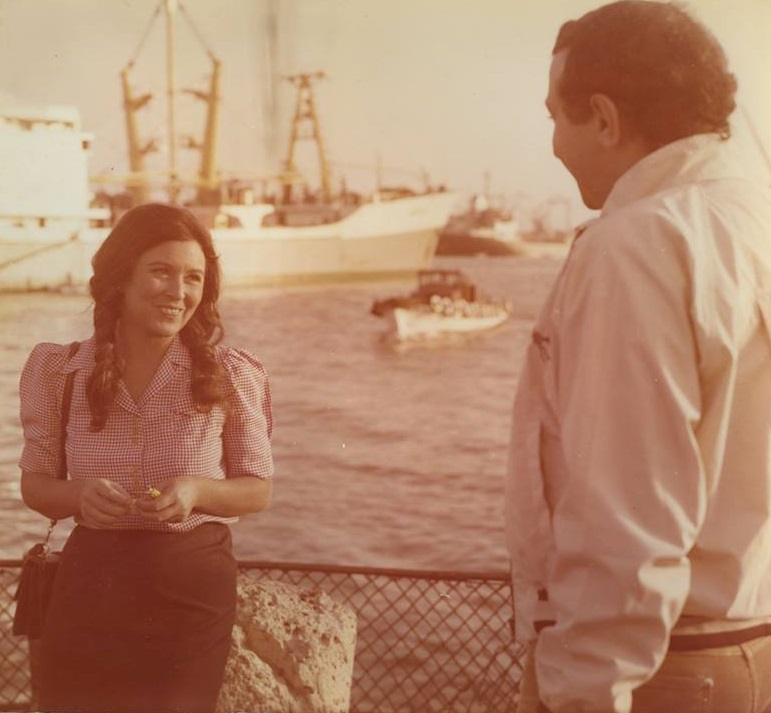
Soad Hosny and Nour El-Sherif during shooting the "People on the Top"

- Soad Hosny as Siham
- Nour El-Sherif as Zaatar
- Ezzat El Alaili as Muhammad
- Omar El-Hariri as Zaghloul
- Aida Riad as Gelgela
- Mahmoud El-Qalaawy as Hosny
- Nadia Ezzat as Sanaa
- Nadia Rafiq as Zaheera
- Nabil Noureddine as Officer
- Hassan Hussein as Abu Saleh
- Salah Rashwan as Refaat
- Ibrahim Qadry as Hanash

== See also ==
- Egyptian cinema
- Soad Hosny filmography
- List of Egyptian films of the 1980s
- List of submissions to the 54th Academy Awards for Best Foreign Language Film
- List of Egyptian submissions for the Academy Award for Best Foreign Language Film
