= Amina Rizk =

Egyptian actress (1910–2003)

Amina Rizk أمينة رزق
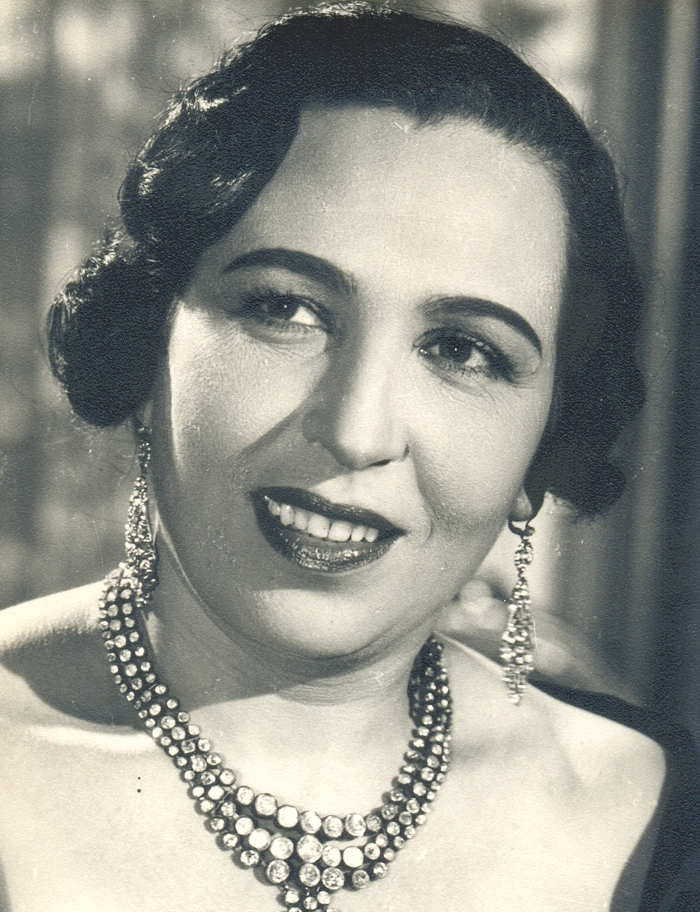
- Born: April 15, 1910; Tanta, Egypt
- Died: August 24, 2003 (aged 93); Cairo, Egypt
- Occupation: Actress

Amina Rizk (Arabic: أمينة رزق; April 15, 1910 – August 24, 2003) was a classic Egyptian actress who appeared in around 208 artworks including more than 70 movies between 1928 and 1996. She was calm in her later years, but described as a clown when she was young.

== Life ==
Amina Rizk came from a poor rural area. She and her aunt, Amina Mohamed, moved to Cairo with their mothers; the pair were locked in the house after their first theatrical performance. She was popular for her roles as the kind-hearted mother in plays and films, appearing in major pictures such as Doa al karawan in 1959 in which she appeared alongside actors such as Faten Hamama and Ahmed Mazhar, and A'sefa Min Alhub, in which she played the role of the Mother to Salah Zulfikar, and Bidaya wa nihaya, in which she played the role of the Mother to Omar Sharif, Farid Shawqi and Sanaa Gamil. She also starred in many TV Series between the 1980s until her death before which she was filming a TV series for the holy month of Ramadan.

Amina Rizk in the 1930s

== Filmography ==
Transliteration	Year	Arabic	Translation
* Suad al ghagharia	(1928)	سعاد الغجرية	Suad the Gypsy
* Awlad el zawat	(1932)	أولاد الذوات	Sons of Aristocrats (Spoiled Children =International title)
* Defaa, Al	(1935)	الدفاع	The Defense
* Saet el tanfiz	(1938)	ساعة التنفيذ	Hour of Execution (The Hour of Fate =International title)
* Doctor, El	(1940)	الدكتور	The Doctor
* Kaiss wa leia	(1940)	قيس وليلى	Kaiss wa leila
* Kalb el mar'a	(1940)	قلب المرأة	Heart of a Woman
* Rajul bayn ml rif	(1942)	عاصفة على الريف	A Storm in the Country
* Awlad al fouqara	(1942)	أولاد الفقراء	Children of the Poor
* Cleopatra	(1943)	كليوباترا	Cleopatra
* Boassa, El	(1944)	البؤساء	Miserables, Les
* Berlanti	(1944)	برلنتي	Berlanti
* Man al gani	(1944)	من الجاني؟	Who Is the Criminal?
* Dahaya el madania	(1946)	ضحايا المدينة	Victims of Modernism
* Nessa Muharramat	(1959)	نساء محرمات	Forbidden Women
* Mal wa Nesaa	(1960)	مال ونساء	Money and Women
* A’sefa Min El Hub	(1961)	عاصفة من الحب	A Storm of Love
* Aaz el habaieb	(1961)	أعز الحبايب	The dearest of all (I Want Love =International title)
* Dema alal Neel	(1961)	دماء على النيل	Blood on the Nile
* Haked, El	(1962)	الحاقد	The Vengeful One
* Rajul el taalab, El	(1962)	الرجل التعلب	The Fox-Man (The Smart Operator =International title)
* Shoumou el sawdaa, El	(1962)	الشموع السوداء	The Black Candles
* Telmiza, El	(1962)	التلميذة	The Student
* Ressalah min emraa maghoula	(1962)	رسالة من إمرأة مجهولة	Letter from an Unknown Woman
* Shayatin el lail	(1965)	شيطان الليل	Satan of the night (Nightmares = International title)
* El Mamalik	(1965)	المماليك	The Mamelukes
* Wadia, El	(1966)	الوديعة	The Pledge
* Kandil Om Hashem	(1968)	قنديل أم هاشم	Om Hashem's Lantern
* Bamba kashar	(1974)	بمبى كشر	Bamba kashar
* Orid hallan	(1975)	أريد حلًا	I want a solution
* Saqqa mat, al-	(1977)	السقا مات	The Water-Carrier Is Dead
* Kit Kat, El	(1991)	الكيت كات	Kit Kat
* Ard el ahlam	(1993)	أرض الاحلام	Land of Dreams
* Nasser 56	(1996)	ناصر ٥٦	Nasser 56
