= A Storm of Love =

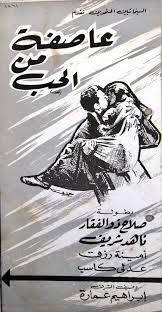
- عاصفة من الحب
- Directed by: Hussein el-Mohandess
- Written by: Hussein el-Mohandess
- Produced by: Abdel Aziz Fahmy
- Starring: Salah Zulfikar; Nahed Sherif
- Cinematography: Abdel Aziz Fahmy
- Edited by: Hussain Ahmed
- Music by: Fouad el-Zahery
- Production company: United Film Company
- Distributed by: United Cinemas (Sobhi Farhat)
- Release date: 1961
- Running time: 114 minutes
- Country: Egypt
- Language: Arabic

A Storm of Love (Arabic: عاصفة من الحب, transliterated A'sefa min al-hubb or A'sefa Min Alhub) is an Egyptian film released in 1961. The film is directed and written by Hussein el-Mohandess, and stars Salah Zulfikar and Nahed Sherif.

== Synopsis ==
A rivalry develops between the Ubaida and Rizeiga tribes: an Ubaida mother asks her son Hamed to burn Rizeiga crops once the killer of a Rizeiga is released from prison. Hamed is considered one of the most eligible bachelors in the village, and while his mother wants him to pick a glamorous village woman, he is struck by a dancing gypsy girl named Khaleda and determined to seduce her. Opposed by her patron Sharif and his family, Hamed elopes with Khaleda to the coastal region of El Manzala, where they eke out a modest living on his fishing wages and their whereabouts are known to none back home except the trusted Sheikh Mabrouk. Sharif, however, arrives at their bungalow to retrieve his meal ticket, convincing her to leave Hamed.

Hamed returns to his home village and marries his mother's choice, Zainab, but Khaleda remains by the sea and decides not to return to Sharif's enslavement. Sheikh Mabrouk shelters her and sends for Hamed when she suffers health complications after giving birth to a son, which ultimately kill her. Hamed returns to the village and Zainab promises to raise the child with him as their own.

== Crew ==
- Director: Hussein el-Mohandess
- Studio: United Film Company, produced by Abdel Aziz Fahmy and partners
- Distributor: United Cinema, run by Sobhi Farhat
- Cinematographer: Abdel Aziz Fahmy
- Music: Fouad el-Zahery

== Cast ==
=== Main cast ===
- Salah Zulfikar (Hamed)
- Nahed Sherif (Khaleda)
- Amina Rizk (Hamed's mother)
- Adly Kasseb (Sharif)
- Widad Hamdi (Khaleda's friend)
- Nadia Al-Gindi (Zainab)
- Muhammad Othman (Zainab's father)
- Mohsen Hassanein (Rizeiga chief)
- Ibrahim Emara (Sheikh Mabrouk)

=== Supporting cast ===
- Lotfi Abdel Hamid
- Mohamed Hamdi
- Mohamed Maghraby
- Abdul Hamid Badawi
- Mahmoud al-Arabi
- Fawzi Darwish
