= My Wife and the Dog =

1971 film

- Directed by: Said Marzouk
- Written by: Said Marzouk
- Starring: Soad Hosny
- Release date: 1971
- Running time: 90 minutes
- Country: Egypt
- Language: Arabic

My Wife and the Dog (Arabic: زوجتي و الكلب, translit. Zawgaty Wal Kalb) is a 1971 Egyptian drama film directed by Said Marzouk. The film was selected as the Egyptian entry for the Best Foreign Language Film at the 45th Academy Awards, but was not accepted as a nominee.

== Cast ==
- Soad Hosny
- Nour El-Sherif
- Mahmoud Moursy
- Abdel Moneim Bahnassy
- Zizi Mustafa

== See also ==
- List of submissions to the 45th Academy Awards for Best Foreign Language Film
- List of Egyptian submissions for the Academy Award for Best Foreign Language Film
