= Farouk El-Fishawy =

Egyptian actor (1952–2019)

- Born: Mohamed Farouk El-Fishawy; 5 February 1952; Sirs El-Layan, Monufia Governorate, Kingdom of Egypt
- Died: 25 July 2019 (aged 67); Giza, Egypt
- Education: Ain Shams University
- Occupation: Actor
- Years active: 1976–2019
- Spouses: Sumaya Elalfy (m. 1972; div. 1992); Soheir Ramzi (m. 1992; div. 1997); Nouran Mansor (m. 1997; div. 1998)
- Children: 2

Farouk El-Fishawy (Arabic: فاروق الفيشاوي; 5 February 1952 – 25 July 2019) was an Egyptian actor. He was known for Al-Mashbouh (1981).

== Early life ==
He was born as Mohamed Farouk El-Fishawy in Sirs El-Layan, Monufia Governorate on 5 February 1952. He was one of the youngest of his 3 brothers and 2 sisters. His father died when he was 11 years old and his elder brother Rashad El-Fishawy took care of him and raised him. He received his bachelor's degree in general medicine and before that he received his Bachelor of Arts from Ain Shams University.

== Career ==
He started his career in the 1970s and starred in dozens of films and television series. He worked in more than 130 films, including al-Qatila (1991), al-Tufan (1985), al-Rasif (1993), Mutarada Fi al-Mamnu (1993), Ghadan Sa'antaqem (1980), Hanafy al-Obaha (1990), La Tasalni Man Ana (1984), Siriyun Lilghaya (1986), Nessa Khalf al-Qodban (1986), Qahwat al-Muaridi (1981), el-Mar'a el-Hadeedeya (1987), Fatat Min Israeel (1999), al-Fadiha (1992) and Dik al-Barabir (1992). He also worked in TV dramas.

== Personal life ==
El-Fishawy married three times. His first wife was actress Sumaya Elalfy, from 1972 until their divorce in 1992. They had two sons, Omar and Ahmed. His second wife was actress Soheir Ramzi; they married in 1992 and separated after five years, subsequently divorcing. His third wife was non-celebrity, Nouran Mansor and separated in 1998. He also had a relationship with actress Laila Elwi, but they did not marry.

== Illness and death ==
On 3 October 2018, Farouk El-Fishawy, after receiving a shield from the Alexandria International Film Festival, announced that he had cancer.

El-Fishawy succumbed to liver cancer on 25 July 2019 at the age of 67.
