= The Suspect (1981 film) =

Al-Mashbouh المشبوه The Suspect
- Directed by: Samir Seif
- Written by: Ibrahim Al Mougi
- Produced by: Wasef Faiez
- Starring: Soad Hosny; Adel Emam
- Music by: Hani Shenouda
- Release date: 20 July 1981
- Running time: 125 minutes
- Country: Egypt
- Language: Egyptian Arabic

Al-Mashbouh (Arabic: المشبوه; The Suspect) is a 1981 Egyptian romance movie directed by Samir Seif, starring Soad Hosny and Adel Emam. It tells the story of a burglar, a belly dancer, a policeman and a friend of them.

== Cast ==
- Soad Hosny as Batta.
- Adel Emam as Maher.
- Farouk al-Fishawy as Tarek.
- Saeed Saleh as Bayoumy.

== See also ==
- Egyptian films of the 1980s
- List of Egyptian films of 1981
