= Fawzi Saleh =

Egyptian filmmaker

- Born: Ahmed Fawzi Saleh; January 1, 1981 (age 45); Alexandria, Egypt
- Education: Suez Canal University; Cairo Higher Institute of Cinema
- Occupations: Director, screenwriter, co-producer
- Years active: 2008–present

Ahmed Fawzi Saleh (born 1 January 1981) is an Egyptian filmmaker. He is best known as the director of critically acclaimed film Poisonous Roses. Apart from filmmaking, Saleh is also a social activist.

== Personal life ==
He was born on 1 January 1981 in Alexandria, Egypt. He obtained a degree in history from Suez Canal University and then obtained a degree in screenwriting from the Cairo Higher Institute of Cinema in 2009.

== Career ==
In 2008, he worked as an assistant director for Rashid Masharawi. Under the guidance of Masharawi in 2010, Saleh made his maiden documentary short Living Skin which was premiered in 2011. The film received critical acclaim and screened in many international film festivals.

With the success of maiden short, he then made his maiden feature Poisonous Roses in 2018. The film had its World premiere at 47th International Film Festival Rotterdam in Bright Future section. The film later selected as the Egyptian entry for the Best International Feature Film at the 92nd Academy Awards, but it was not nominated.

He also contributed as a volunteer in many activates of Human Rights groups in Egypt.

== Filmography ==
Year	Film	Role	Genre	Ref.
2010	Living Skin	Director, screenplay, co-producer	Documentary	
2018	Poisonous Roses	Director, scriptwriter, co-producer	Film	
2020	The Thief	Writer	TV series	
