= Shafika and Metwali =

1979 film

- Directed by: Ali Badrakhan
- Written by: Salah Jahin
- Starring: Soad Hosny; Ahmed Zaki
- Cinematography: Abdelhalim Nasr; Mohsen Nasr
- Edited by: Saeed El-Sheikh
- Music by: Fouad El-Zahery
- Production company: Misr International Films
- Distributed by: Misr International Films
- Release date: 1979
- Country: Egypt
- Language: Egyptian Arabic

Shafika and Metwali or Chafika et Metwal (Egyptian Arabic: شفيقه ومتولى) is a 1979 Egyptian drama/romance film starring Soad Hosny and Ahmed Zaki. It is written and directed by Ali Badrakhan, based on a story by Salah Jahin.

== Plot ==
The film was based on a folktale about brother and sister Shafika and Metwally. Where the wayward sister (Souad Hosni) escapes her petty existence in a small Upper Egyptian village and moves to the city. Chafika's poverty finally takes her to acquire a bad reputation as a belly dancer and kept woman.

Badrakhan gave the story an unconventional socio-political edge by setting it at the middle of the 19th century, when depraved Egyptian Pashas stopped at nothing to increase their wealth and influence, even if it meant trading in their own people's lives and sacrificing others’ integrity.

== Cast ==
- Soad Hosny as Chafika
- Ahmed Zaki as Metwalli
- Mahmoud Abdel Aziz as Diab
- Ahmed Mazhar as Tarabishi Bek
- Gamil Ratib as Afandina
- Mahmoud El Gendy
- Ahmed Bedir
- Younes Shalaby

== Awards ==
- 1980: Tanit d'Bronze Award for Ali Badrakhan. Carthage Film Festival, Tunisia.
- 1980: Golden Montgolfiere Award for Ali Badrakhan. Nantes Three Continents Festival, France.

== See also ==
- Egyptian films of the 1970s
- List of Egyptian films of 1979
- Soad Hosny filmography
