= Hassan and Nayima =

1959 film

Hasan and Na'ima
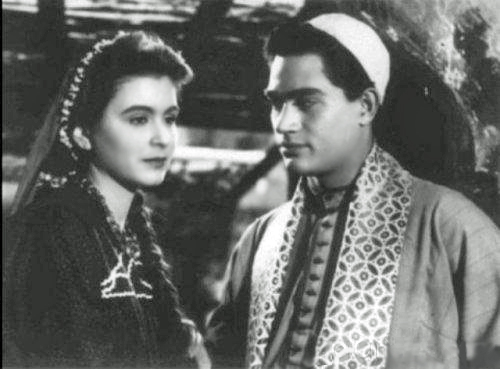
- Directed by: Henry Barakat
- Written by: Henry Barakat; Abdel Rahman El Khamesy
- Starring: Muharram Fouad; Soad Hosny
- Cinematography: Alvisy Orphanily
- Release date: 18 October 1959
- Running time: 104 minutes
- Country: Egypt
- Language: Egyptian Arabic

Hasan and Na'ima (Arabic: حسن و نعيمة, translit. Hassan wa Nayima) is a 1959 Egyptian drama film directed by Henry Barakat. It was entered into the 9th Berlin International Film Festival.

== Cast ==
- Muharram Fouad as Hassan
- Soad Hosny as Nayima
- Mohammed Tawfik
- Hassan el Baroudi
- Leila Fahmi
- Wedad Hamdy

== Reception ==
The film has been included in the 2006 Bibliotheca Alexandrina's 100 Greatest Egyptian Films.
