= The Shepherd and the Women =

Al-Ra'i wal Nisaa / The Shepherd and the Women / لراعي والنساء
- Directed by: Ali Badrakhan
- Starring: Soad Hosni; Ahmed Zaki; Yousra
- Release date: 1991
- Country: Egypt
- Language: Arabic

The Shepherd and the Women (Arabic: الراعي والنساء; Al-Ra'i wal Nisaa) is a 1991 Egyptian drama/romance movie, starring Soad Hosni, Yousra and Ahmed Zaki.

== Plot ==
The story of three women living alone in the desert, but one day they are visited by a young handsome man.

== Cast ==
- Ahmed Zaki
- Souad Hosni as Wafa.
- Yousra
- Mirna

== Awards ==
- "1991: "Best Actress Award" for Souad Hosni. Egyptian Cinema Association, Egypt."
- "1980: "Best Actress Award" for Souad Hosni. Alexandria International Film Festival, Egypt."

== See also ==
- Egyptian films of the 1990s
- List of Egyptian films of 1991
