= Money and Women =

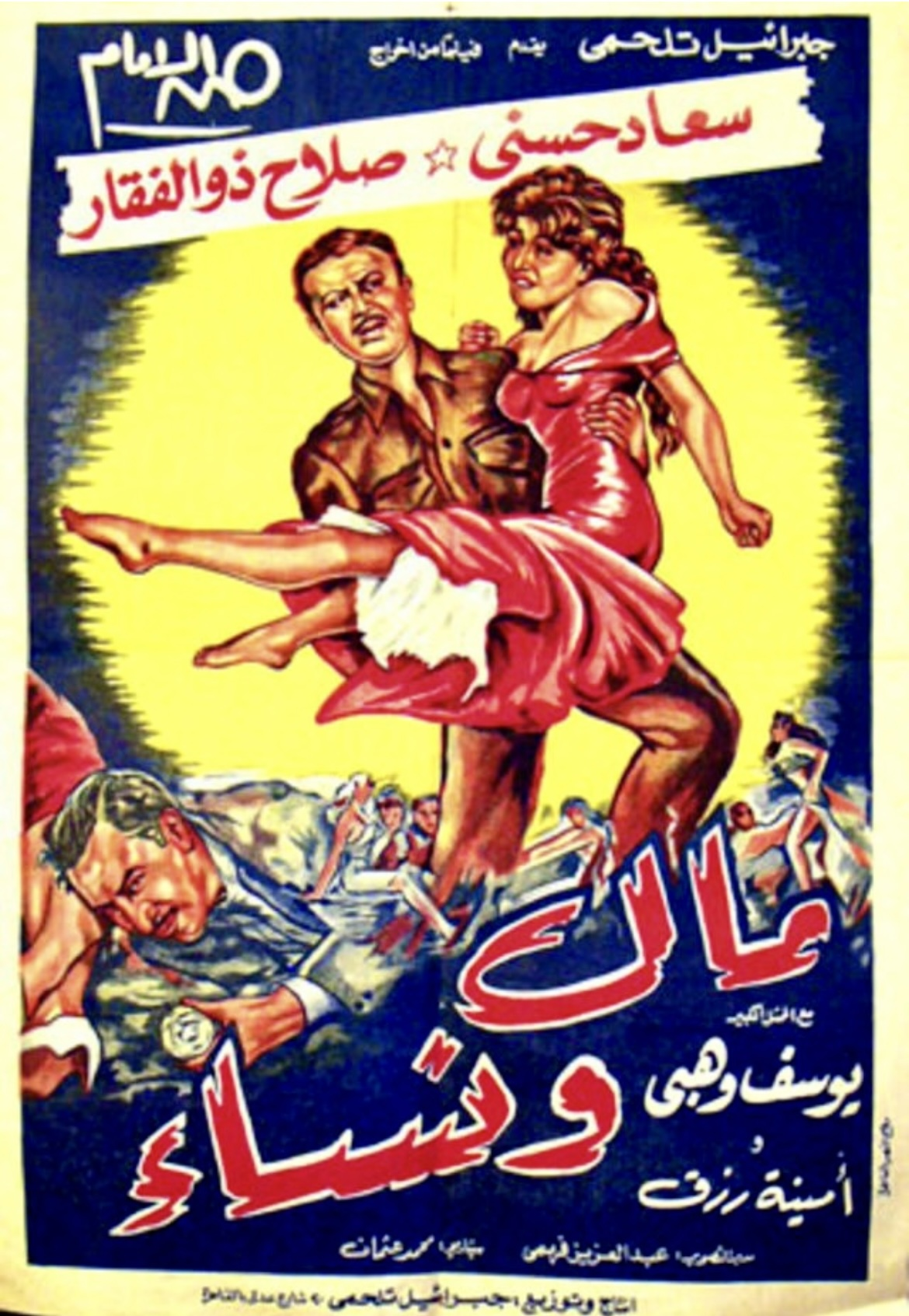
- Film poster
- Egyptian Arabic: مال ونساء
- Directed by: Hassan el-Imam
- Written by: Mohamed Othman; Abdel Rahman Sherif
- Produced by: Gabriel Talhamy
- Starring: Salah Zulfikar; Soad Hosny; Youssef Wahbi
- Cinematography: Abdel Aziz Fahmy
- Edited by: Rachida Abdel Salam
- Music by: Fouad el-Zahery
- Production company: Gabriel Talhamy Films
- Distributed by: Gabriel Talhamy Films
- Release date: 27 November 1960 (Egypt)
- Running time: 140 minutes
- Country: Egypt
- Language: Egyptian Arabic

Money and Women (Arabic: مال ونساء, transliterated: Mal Wa Nissa, aliases: Fortune and Females) is an Egyptian film released in 1960. It is directed by Hassan el-Imam and stars Salah Zulfikar, Soad Hosny and Youssef Wahbi. The film was produced and released by Gabriel Talhamy Films on November 27, 1960.

== Plot ==
Shehata Effendi is an employee in a hospital, a simple man with a lively conscience who represents a thorn in the throat of his corrupt colleagues who embezzled from the hospital's warehouses, and they are Badawi, Hanafi, Borai and Bashkatib, Where they agree with the supplier to send his representative in half the quantities, they sign the invoices in the full amount, and they take the difference for themselves away from Shehata, who was living with his wife Amina and his daughter Nemat who aspires to get rich and glory, and loves her neighbor Hussein, the son of Saber, the shoe worker. Hussein was an employee and affiliated with one of the colleges, and he had got engaged to Nemat, but when Shehata Effendi saw them alone on the rooftops, he hurried to marry them, and applied to the Bashkatib with a request for a loan to prepare his daughter needs for the marriage. One of his friends, in return for a trust receipt, pending the disbursement of the advance, and when they were sure that he had spent the amount on his daughter's marriage, the Bashkatib informed him of the refusal of the advance, and demanded that he sponsor return the money or else imprisonment. He discovered the playful Shehata, then assaulted the Bashkatib, was referred to investigation, was dismissed and imprisoned, and his wife fell ill, so he was forced to kiss the foot of the Bashkatib, who demanded that he closes his eyes from the embezzlement, and gave him the amount he requested from his own pocket as a down payment. Shehata closed his eyes, his wife recovered, his daughter married, and she traveled with her husband to the mines of Abu Znaima in the Red Sea, and she suffered from the life of the desert, and her husband was preoccupied with her with his work and lessons, so she rebelled against this life, and a dispute broke out between them, so she left him and returned to Cairo, to discover that her father had left the house, after Amina refused to live with her with forbidden money, and he rented a separate house, and his life changed for the better. Hussein apologised. She told him, “You are the son of nobody, and I am the daughter of a rich man.” Naamat was deceived by false appearances, and her father's shyness indulged himself in wine and women to enjoy what he missed from the pleasures of the world. But the embezzlement was discovered, so his colleagues sponsored the burning of the stores to try to hid the fraud. Shehata tried to save the hospital from the fire. He died on fire. Nemat tried to get back to Hussein, asking for permission, but he refused. But Saber asked him to pardon and to forgive his beloved, who became alone in this world, so he finally forgave her.

== Crew ==
- Director: Hassan el-Imam
- Screenwriter:
  - Mohamed Othman
  - Abdel Rahman Sherif
- Producer: Gabriel Talhamy
- Studio: Gabriel Talhamy Films
- Distributor: Gabriel Talhamy Films
- Cinematographer: Abdel Aziz Fahmy
- Music: Fouad el-Zahery
- Editing: Rachida Abdel Salam

== Cast ==
- Salah Zulfikar as Hussein
- Soad Hosny as Nemat
- Youssef Wahbi as Shehata
- Amina Rizk as Umm Nemat
- Fakher Fakher as Saber
- Tawfiq Al-Daqan as Borai
- Adly Kasseb as Al-Bash Kateb
- Mohamed El-Deeb as Ali
- Mohamed Shawky as Taha Al-Saei
- Mohamed Sobeih as Hanafi
- Ragaa Hussein as Azza
- Abbas Rahmi as owner of the supply company
- Abdel Moneim Bassiouni as the representative of the supply company
- Naamat Mukhtar
- Hussein Ismail
- Salwa Mahmoud
- Nagwa Fouad (Guest appearance)
- Abdul Moneim Saudi
- Abdul Moneim Ismail
- Hussein Kandil
- Ruhia Jamal
- Abdul Hamid Badawi
- Sultan Al-Jazzar
- Zaki Muhammad Hassan
- Muhammad Suleiman

== See also ==
- List of Egyptian films of the 1960s
