= Watch Out for ZouZou =

- خلي بالك من زوزو
- Directed by: Hassan El-Imam
- Screenplay by: Salah Jahin
- Produced by: Sout El Fen
- Starring: Soad Hosny; Hussein Fahmy
- Edited by: Nadia Shokry
- Music by: Kamal Al Taweel; Salah Jahin
- Release date: 6 November 1972
- Running time: 132 mins
- Country: Egypt
- Language: Egyptian Arabic

Khalli Balak Min ZouZou (Arabic: خلي بالك من زوزو) is a 1972 Egyptian movie directed by Hassan El-Imam starring Soad Hosny, Hussein Fahmy and Taheyya Kariokka. As with many Egyptians movies of the era, it combines drama, comedy, and music. With its musical numbers and dance sequences, it has become one of Hosny's best loved films and a household favourite in Egypt. However, through these dance sequences, it holds a mirror up to Egyptian society in the 1970s. The movie focuses on the tensions within Egyptian society between tradition and modernism, as well as social pressure towards liberalism. Watch Out for ZouZou was listed in the top 100 Egyptian films list.

== Plot ==
ZouZou is a college student that comes from a family of entertainers. Her mother was a retired belly dancer and runs a troupe of performers that entertain at weddings. Her home was on Cairo's famous Muhammad Ali St., known for housing entertainers and musicians. Zouzou performs every night with her family at weddings and private parties as a dancer and singer. This is kept as a secret from all her friends because she worries about how she will be perceived by her peers. Being a professional belly dancer in Egypt during this period was understood to be a low profession, one loosely associated with prostitution, or a lack of morality. Zouzou falls in love with one of her professors who breaks his engagement in order to be with her. The cousin of the professor tries to break off what he has with Zouzou and eventually finds out that she is an entertainer. The cousin frames Zouzou in public, arranging an event that forces her to expose her work as a dancer. Her professor was shocked and ashamed at first, but in the end, all is resolved as Zouzou decides to return to her studies and embrace a bright future free of the need to work as a Muhammad Ali St. dancer.

== Cast ==
- Soad Hosny as Zouzou Almazia
- Taheyya Kariokka as Naima Almazia
- Hussein Fahmy as professor Said Kamel
- Samir Ghanem
- Mohie Ismail
- Nabila El Sayed
- Abbas Fares
- Shahinaz Taha
- Shafik Galal
- Wahid Seif
- Zouzou Shakib
- Ali Gohar
- Mostafa Metwali
- Mona Qattan
- Azza Sherif

== Music ==
Khalli Balak Min ZouZou has many songs that are still sung by Egyptians till now. The songs were the most influential and memorable on Egyptians and many more. Two main music composers were Kamal El-Taweel and Salah Jahin. Kamal El-Taweel was friends with Abdel Halim Hafez, also another great music composer and singer. Kamal El-Taweel created the most memorable song Ya Wad Ya Te’eel (O Teaser Boy) which was sung by Soad Hosny.
