= Ahmed Al-Sheety =

Egyptian novelist

Ahmed Zaghloul al-Sheety
- أحمد الشيطي
- Born: 10 February 1961 (age 65); Damietta, Egypt
- Title: Novelist

Ahmed Zaghloul al-Sheety (Arabic: أحمد الشيطي; born 10 February 1961, Damietta, Egypt) is an Egyptian novelist. Most of his family works in the furniture industry which the city of Damietta is known for.

== Biography ==
When Ahmed al-Sheety was six years old, his father died. He started writing early in his life but was not able to publish any of his stories until 1985, after having graduated and worked as a lawyer. His stories were published in many Egyptian Newspapers and magazines including, al-Masaa’ Magazine, al-Ahli Magazine, Ada bwa Naqd, al-Qahirra, al-Mawqif al-Arabi, al-Insan wa al-Tatawor and more.

He gained recognition after the publication of his novel, Poisonous Roses for a Falcon (original title: Worood Samma le Saqr) which was published in Cairo, February 1990. His novel was received with great enthusiasm by the literary circles in Egypt and abroad for its events that blend with reality and its implications on society. The Adab ad Naqd magazine allocate a critical file for his novel in 1990. Several seminars were held for his novel at the Cairo international Book Fair and many other literary conferences. He is one of the most prominent writers from the 80s and from the 20th century. His writing style is known for its unique taste and distinct flavor.

== Education ==
After he finished his education, Ahmed al-Sheety went to Cairo in the late 70s to continue his education as an undergraduate. He joined the College of Law at the University of Cairo and he graduated in May 1983. Since he was six years old, he worked during the school holidays, and sometimes he worked while school was going on. He worked in the industry of craftsmanship, and he specifically worked in what is known as "Awima" which involves engraving on wood.

== Works ==
- Paper Dolls (1994) (original title: Ara’es men Waraq)
- Poisonous Roses for a Falcon (original title: Worood Samma le Saqr) – In 1990 this novel was nominated for Best Egyptian Novel of the Year Award by the Ada bwa Naqd magazine.
- Transparent Light Spreads Slowly (original title: Daw’ Shafaf Yantasher be Khefa) – This book contains short texts written and published in literary periodicals like Akhbar al-Adab, al-Quds al-Arabi, al-Badeel, al-thaqafa al-Jadida and more. These texts were published in the years between 1995 and 2009.
- A Hundred Steps of Revolution: Days in Tahrir Square (2011) (original title: Me’at Khatwa me al-Thawra: Yawmiyat men Meidan al-Tahrir)
- Heliopolis Rock (2019) (original title: Sakhrat Heliopolis) – In this book, the author talks about the times when his mother would take him to visit his father in the hospital. He mentions the vast sunny garden adorned with ficuses, cypresses, eucalyptus and jazorinas. He also recalls the short-trimmed plants framing the corridors leading to the building. He also remembers how his mother would dress herself in black and the memories he had left of his father were mainly from the hospital. His father would smile while engrossed with his secret, as if he knew that he wouldn't see his wife giving birth, and that Zayn would be born after his death.
