= Cairo 30 =

1966 film

- Directed by: Salah Abu Seif
- Screenplay by: Salah Abu Seif; Naguib Mahfouz
- Based on: Modern Cairo by Naguib Mahfouz
- Produced by: Gamal El Leithy
- Starring: Soad Hosny; Ahmed Mazhar
- Cinematography: Wahid Farid
- Music by: Fouad El Zahry
- Release date: 31 October 1966
- Running time: 130 minutes
- Country: Egypt
- Language: Arabic

Cairo 30 (Arabic: القاهرة 30, translit. Al-Qāhira 30) is a 1966 Egyptian drama film directed by Salāḥ Abu Seif, and based on Naguib Mahfouz's 1945 novel Modern Cairo. The film was selected as the Egyptian entry for the Best Foreign Language Film at the 39th Academy Awards, but was not accepted as a nominée.

== Cast ==
- Soad Hosny as Ihsan
- Ahmed Mazhar as The minister
- Hamdy Ahmed as Mahgoub Abdel Dayem
- Abdelmonem Ibrahim as Ahmed Bedier
- Tawfik El Deken as Shahata Tourky
- Abdelaziz Mikewy as Ali Taha
- Aqeila Rateb as The minister's wife
- Ahmed Tawfik as Salem El Ekshidy
- Bahiga Hafez as Ikram hanem

== Synopsis ==
The film takes place in the 1930s, when a young man named Mahjoub Abdeldayem (Hamdy Ahmed) comes from Upper Egypt to the slums of Cairo and gets to know a native of his village (Salem al-Ikhshidi) who offers a job lead. The job is to marry Ihsan (Soad Hosny), mistress of Qasim Bey (Ahmed Mazhar, on condition that Qasim visits her once a week.

== See also ==
- List of submissions to the 39th Academy Awards for Best Foreign Language Film
- List of Egyptian submissions for the Academy Award for Best Foreign Language Film
