= Karnak Café (novel) =

1974 novella written by Naguib Mahfouz

- Book cover for Karnak Café (2007 edition)
- Author: Naguib Mahfouz
- Original title: Al-Karnak الكرنك
- Translator: Roger Allen (Anchor Books, 2007)
- Genre: Fiction, Literature, Egyptian Literature, Arabic Literature
- Publication date: 1974
- Publication place: Egypt
- Media type: Print (paperback)
- Pages: 112 pp

Karnak Café (Al-Karnak, Arabic: الكرنك) is a novella written in 1974 by Egyptian writer Naguib Mahfouz, winner of the Nobel Prize in Literature in 1988. The novel was made into a film of the same name in 1975. Set against the discussions between the patrons of a café in Cairo, the Karnak Café, the book follows the stories of three individuals during the 1960s, including the Six-Day War (1967) and the War of Attrition (1967–70). It therein explores some of the political currents vying for control over Egyptian politics in the 1960s as well as political persecution, the deep state, and state violence.

== Plot summary ==
The narrator begins the story by describing how he originally discovered the Karnak Café in Cairo, attracted by the quiet charms of Qurunfula, a bellydancer of former fame and the café's owner. There, the narrator quickly becomes part of the café's regular crowd of patrons, which represent a cross-section of Egyptian society during the early 1960s. Among many others, the crowd includes the following young people: Hilmi Hamada, an idealistic communist with whom Qurunfula has a discreet love affair; Isma'il al-Shaykh, a law graduate of modest origins; and Zaynab Diyab, another graduate from a poor background. Throughout the story, the youth are repeatedly arrested and imprisoned for prolonged periods; a mirror to Qurunfula's despair, the narrator keeps track how the youths' initial political enthusiasm and optimism slowly gives place to disillusion and hopelessness. After their third prison term, the café learns that Hilmi Hamada has died in prison, leaving Qurunfula distraught. As Isma'il and Zaynab open up to the narrator, he learns of the horrors Isma'il and Zaynab endured in prison – Isma'il is repeatedly tortured while Zaynab is raped – and how the ruthless and brutal police officer Khalid Sawfan turned both Isma'il and Zaynab into informants for the secret police after their second term in prison. As Hilmi tries to convince Isma'il and Zaynab of the necessity of communism, he is betrayed by Zaynab, who tries to thereby keep Isma'il safe, and is beaten to death in prison. The defeat of the Egyptian army during the Six-Day War sees Isma'il, who was imprisoned in spite of Zaynab's assistance, and a reversal of fortunes: after being thrown into prison and having become disabled through torture, Sawfan joins the regular crowd of the Karnak Café, painting himself both as a criminal and a victim and gaining the patrons' appreciation through witty political commentary. The novel ends on a hopeful note with Qurunfula setting her eyes upon Munir Ahmad, a new idealistic and innocent youth: for purity and innocence never disappear forever.
