= Too Young for Love (1966 film) =

- Directed by: Niazi Mostafa
- Written by: Abo El Seoud El Ebiary; Abdel Hai Adib; Niazi Mostafa
- Produced by: Madiha Yousry
- Starring: Soad Hosny; Rushdy Abaza
- Music by: Ali Ismael
- Release date: January 5, 1966
- Running time: 105 minutes
- Country: Egypt
- Language: Arabic

Too Young for Love (Arabic: صغيرة على الحب, translit. Saġira ala El-Hub) is a 1966 Egyptian film directed by Niazi Mostafa.

== Cast ==
- Soad Hosny as Samiha/Karima
- Rushdy Abaza as Kamal Azmy
- Nour El-Demerdash as Salah Abdel Samad
- Nadia El Gendy as Nadia
- Zeinab Sedky as The grandmother
- Adly Kasseb as Shaker
- Samir Ghanem as Sherif

== See also ==
- Cinema of Egypt
- Lists of Egyptian films
- List of Egyptian films of the 1960s
