= Where Is My Mind? (film) =

- Egyptian Arabic: أين عقلي
- Directed by: Atef Salem
- Screenplay by: Raafat el-Mihi
- Story by: Ihsan Abdel Quddous
- Produced by: Abbas Helmy
- Starring: Soad Hosny; Mahmoud Yassin; Rushdy Abaza
- Cinematography: Abdelhalim Nasr
- Edited by: Fekri Rostam
- Music by: Omar Khorshid
- Production company: Al-Ittihad Films
- Release date: 21 January 1974 (Egypt)
- Country: Egypt
- Language: Egyptian Arabic

Where Is My Mind (Egyptian Arabic: أين عقلي) is a 1974 Egyptian film directed by Atef Salem. It features a screenplay by Raafat el-Mihi based on a novel by Ihsan Abdel Quddous. It stars Soad Hosny, Mahmoud Yassin and Rushdy Abaza.

== Synopsis ==
Dr. Tawfiq is captive to the marital tradition of virgin honor despite his picking up habits from time studying in Europe. His liberal mind cannot reconcile with his native environment. After returning from Europe, he marries Aida who confides in him that she lost her virginity in a torrid love affair with her deceased ex-fiancé. Though an educated liberal man, he tells her he does not want to know anything about her past and does not care anyway. However, he suffers a psychological crisis upon discovering her having been with someone else.

When Aida notices his disturbances, he blames her and she encounters her own mental health symptoms, leading her to consult a psychiatrist, Dr. Zuhdi. In flashbacks, Aida simultaneously renders to her counselor and the audience alike her life prior to marrying Dr. Tawfiq, including the ex and the husband's gaslighting. Dr. Zuhdi is convinced by her arguments and asks her to help him investigate the husband to understand the situation better. She points him to their chauffeur, Saber, who tells Dr. Zuhdi that Dr. Tawfiq propositions lottery sellers. On Dr. Zuhdi's request, Saber brings in a lottery ticket saleswoman, who tells of Dr. Tawfiq inviting her home to protect her then becoming angry at her “loss of honor” (to him of course) like that of his wife. Convinced of the pattern, Dr. Zuhdi discovers an explanation in the culture shock between Dr. Tawfiq's early village life and his European city years. Dr. Tawfiq receives marital counseling and leaves the contradictions behind.

== Cast ==
- Soad Hosny as Aida
- Mahmoud Yassin as Dr. Tawfiq
- Rushdy Abaza as Dr. Zuhdi
- Emad Hamdy as Aida's father
- Saeed Saleh as Tawfiq's driver
- Mustafa Fahmy as Aida's fiancée
- Nabila El Sayed as Aida's mother
- Hayat Kandel as lottery ticket seller
- Sayed Zayan as Saber, the driver
- Hassan al-Yamani as doctor's secretary

== Reception ==
Where Is My Mind? is one of the most prominent and daring films to deal with female virginity taboos in Arab culture. As an ancient facet of Arab and Islamic culture, it is still a sensitive subject around the region. The matrimony both in the house and the therapy sessions is the focus here, and no scenes depict anything save for Aida's therapy flashbacks.

Director Atef Salem strove to cover the topic carefully with careful study of psychology and psychoanalysis. He also secured career highlights for the principal actors, especially Mahmoud Yassin and Soad Hosny.

== See also ==
- List of Egyptian films of the 1970s
