= Adly Kasseb =

Egyptian actor (1918–1978)

- Born: April 21, 1918
- Died: September 13, 1978 (aged 60)
- Education: Institute of Dramatic Art
- Occupation: Actor
- Years active: 1918 - 1978

Adly Kasseb عدلى كاسب (full name: Adly Abdel Hamid Kasseb) (April 21, 1918 – September 13, 1978) was an Egyptian actor who acted in many movies and plays. His talent was recognized since he was a child and has grown over the years.

== Biography ==
He graduated from the faculty of Applied Arts then worked as a teacher in the faculty of Engineering for 12 years. When the Institute of Dramatic Art opened he joined it and earned a Bachelor of Dramatic Art. He resigned his job in the faculty of Engineering and worked as an acting teacher in the Ministry of Education, he was promoted until he reached Undersecretary of the Ministry.

He joined a lot of theater teams, starting with "The Modern Theater (national)" then Youssef Wahby then Ismail Yassin then Naguib El Rehany then Hassan Youssef then Naguib El Rayhany again which he acted in for about 30 years. He was nicknamed "the actor of the 1000 faces" or "the cinema demon" for his ability to act any role personifying the different types of personalities, he acted many roles from comedy to evil. He also acted in Wakeful Eyes, Return My Heart, Gameela, Mal Wa Nissa, A’sefa Min El Hub, El Hub Keda, Thalath Losoos and Al-Zawjah al-Azra'.
