= Mahmoud Yassin =

Egyptian actor (1941–2020)

- Born: 2 June 1941; Port Said, Kingdom of Egypt
- Died: 14 October 2020 (aged 79); Cairo, Egypt
- Occupation: Actor
- Years active: 1968–2012
- Spouses: Shahira (m. 1970)
- Children: 2

Mahmoud Yassin (Arabic: محمود ياسين; 19 February 1941 – 14 October 2020) was an Egyptian actor. He was an iconic actor in both Egyptian cinema and television, portraying dramatic, psychological and romantic roles.

== Career ==
Yassin studied law at the Ain Shams University in 1964, then he started his acting career in 1968, where he acted in more than 150 films and theatrical plays. His last work was a comedy film Grandpa Habibi in 2012.

== Personal life ==
He married the actress Shahira in October 1970, with whom he had Rania (b. 1972) and Amro (b. 1978).

== Death ==
Having suffered from Alzheimer's disease for eight years, Yassin died on 14 October 2020.

== Selected filmography ==
=== Films ===
Year	Film	Role	Notes
1968	The Man Who Lost His Shadow		
1969	Stories from our country		
1971	The Thin Thread		
1969	A Taste of Fear		
1974	The Bullet is still in my pocket		
1974	Where Is My Mind?		
1975	Whom Should We Shoot?		
1975	The liar		
1977	Mouths and Rabbits		
1978	Roadless Traveller		
1978	Al Amaleyyya 42	Colonel Sami	
1988	Days of Terror		
2007	The Island		

=== TV series ===
Year	Series	Role	Notes
1969	Al-Raqam Al-Maghool'		
1978	Ba'd Al-Daya'		
2002–03	ElAsyann		
