= Nahed Sherif =

Egyptian actress (1942–1981)

- Nahed Sherif in 1974
- Born: Samiha Zaki El-Nial; January 1, 1942; Beni Suef, Kingdom of Egypt
- Died: April 7, 1981 (aged 39); Cairo, Egypt
- Years active: 1958–1980
- Spouse(s): Hussein Helmy El-Mohandess; Kamal el-Shennawi; Edward Gergian
- Children: Patricia Gergian

Nahed Sherif (Egyptian Arabic: ناهد شريف) (1 January 1942 – 7 April 1981) was an Egyptian actress who came to prominence in Egyptian and Lebanese films of the 1960s and 1970s.

== Biography ==
Born Samiha Zaki El-Nial (سميحة زكي النيال) in Beni Suef Governorate in Upper Egypt and a Lycée Français du Caire dropout, she was discovered by director Hussein Helmy El-Mohandess and made her debut in 1958.

Nahed Sherif in Hassan el-Imam's Love and Money (1969)

In 1961, she married El-Mohandess and he directed two films offering her starring roles opposite Egyptian Cinema's box-office mogul Salah Zulfikar in the romance, A Storm of Love (عاصفة من الحب), Me and my Daughters (أنا و بناتي), earning commercial success for both films. Her marriage with El-Mohandess lasted for a brief period and she later married fellow actor Kamal El-Shennawi. While married to El-Shennawy, she was paired with Salah Zulfikar for the third time in Virgo (برج العذراء) and for the fourth time in the crime-thriller The Killers (القتلة), both films were box-office hits.

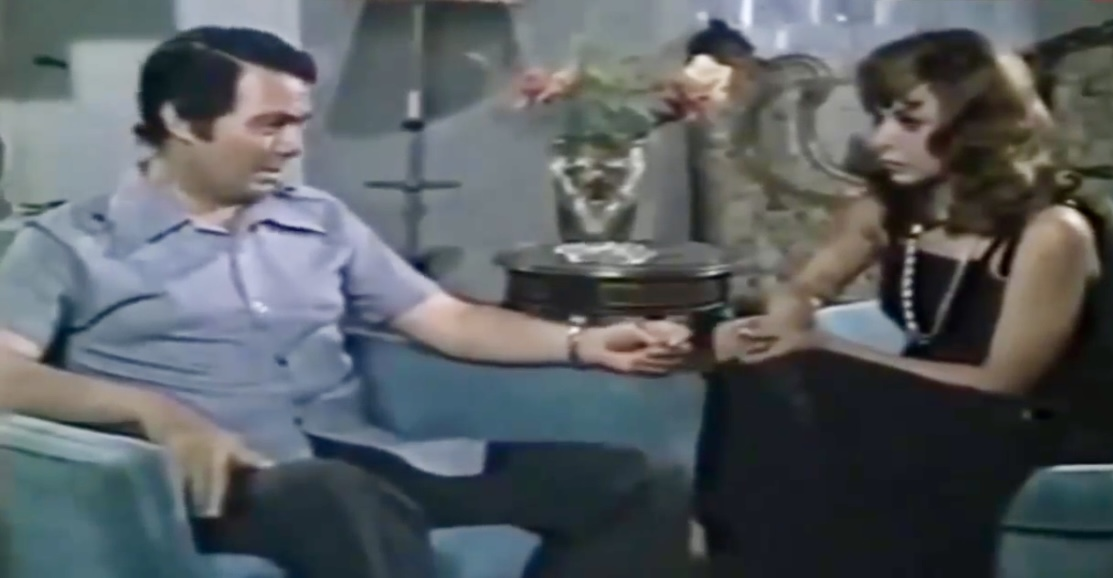
Nahed Sherif with Salah Zulfikar in Desire and Price (1978)

After divorce with El-Shennawi, Sherif moved to Lebanon and made her Lebanese film debut with 1973 action film Kuwait Connection (ذئاب لا تأكل اللحم) directed by Sami A. Khouri who reached fame with The Lady of the Black Moons. She later starred in a number of other Lebanese films and married Lebanese Armenian Edward Gergian. She was paired with Salah Zulfikar for the fifth and last time in the crime film; Desire and Price (الرغبة والثمن), a commercial hit released in 1978.

== Later life and death ==
In the late 1970s, Sherif was diagnosed with breast cancer and received treatment in the United Kingdom. During this period, it was reported that her husband, Edward Gergian, misappropriated financial aid and gifts intended for her treatment, including support from her colleagues and friends.

Sherif sought assistance from the Egyptian Embassy in London, where Ambassador Hassan Abu Sa'ada helped facilitate her divorce from Gergian. Following medical advice that returning to Egypt could improve her psychological well-being, she moved back to Cairo.

Shortly before her death, Sherif was visited by Nadia Lutfi and Kamal El-Shennawi to whom she requested a modest funeral. She died on 7 April 1981 at the Military Hospital in Maadi, at the age of 39. Her daughter remained in Britain under the care of relatives, as her father did not assume custody.
