= Ali Badrakhan =

Egyptian film director

- علي بدرخان
- Born: April 25, 1946 (age 79); Cairo, Egypt
- Occupations: Film director, screenwriter
- Known for: The Love that was
- Spouse: Soad Hosny (m. 1970; div. 1981)
- Father: Ahmed Badrakhan

Ali Badrakhan (born April 25, 1946) is an Egyptian film director and screenwriter, the son of the director Ahmed Badrakhan. He worked as assistant to Fatin Abdel Wahab in Land of Hypocrisy in 1968, and with Youssef Chahine in the films Selection in 1971 and The Sparrow in 1974; his first movie was The Love That Was (1973) by Soad Hosny. Badrakhan collaborated with Naguib Mahfouz, Salah Jahin, and Ahmed Zaki.

== Early life ==
Badrakhan was born to Ahmed Badrakhan who is of Kurdish descent and Salwa Allam in Cairo circa 1946.

== Filmography ==
Year	Title	Arabic Title	Notes
1969	Nadia		
1975	Karnak	الكرنك	Director, Writer
1978	Shafika and Metwali	شفيقة ومتولي	Director, Writer
1981	People on the Top	أهل القمة	Director, Writer
1986	The Hunger	Al-Go'a, الجوع	Director, Writer, Producer
1991	The Sheperd and the Women	Al-Ra'i wal Nisaa, الراعى والنساء	Director, Producer
2002	Desire	Al-Raghba	Director

== See also ==
- Cinema of Egypt
- Top 100 Egyptian films of the 20th century

== Bibliography ==
- Laura U. Marks, Hanan Al-Cinema: Affections for the Moving Image, The MIT Press UK. 2015.
- Josef Gugler, Film in the Middle East and North Africa: Creative Dissidence, University of Texas Press Austin, USA. 2011, pages 369.
- Terri Ginsberg, Chris Lippard, Historical Dictionary of Middle Eastern Cinema, Scarecrow Press, UK. 2010, 527 pages.
- Jean-François, Brière, Dictionnaire des cinéastes africains de long métrage, Karthala-ATM, 411 2008, pages.
- Roy Armes, Dictionary of African Filmmakers, Indiana University Press, USA. 2008, 402 pages.
- Viola, Shafik, Popular Egyptian Cinema: Gender, Class, and Nation, American University Press in Cairo, Egypt. 2007, 349 pages.
- Joel S. Gordon, Revolutionary melodrama: popular film and civic identity in Nasser's Egypt, Middle East Documentation Center, 2002, 300 pages.
- Leaman, Oliver, Companion, Encyclopedia of Middle Eastern and North African Film, London : Routledge, 2001.
- Hind Rassam Culhane, East/West, an ambiguous state of being: the construction and representation of Egyptian cultural identity in Egyptian film, P. Lang, 1995, 226 pages.
- Keith, Shiri, Directory of African film-makers and films, Greenwood Press, 1992, 194 pages.
- Peter Cowie, International Film Guide, Tantivy Press, 1977, 536 pages.
