= Soad Hosny =

Egyptian actress (1943–2001)

- سعاد حسني
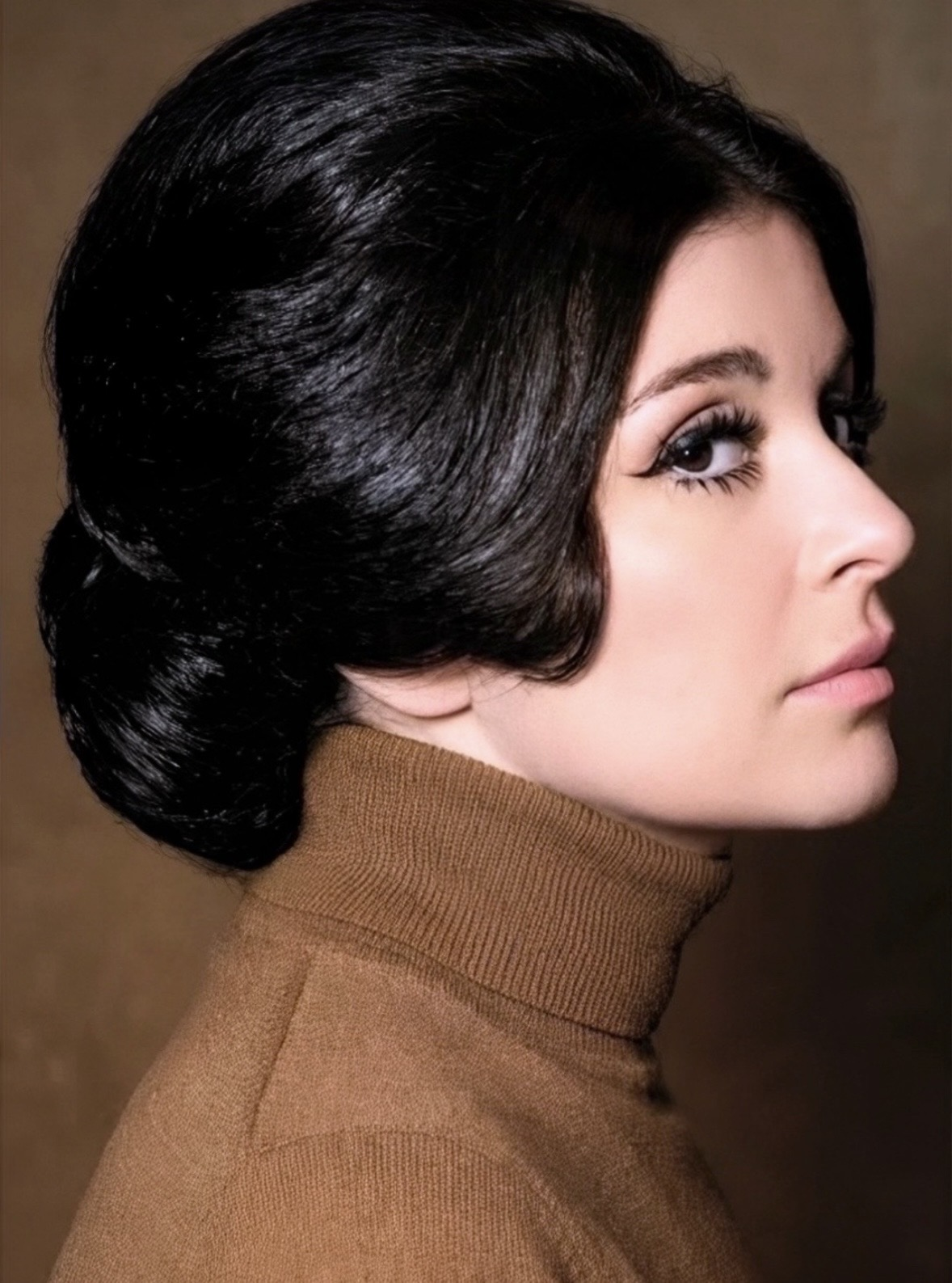
- Hosny in 1971
- Born: Soad Mohammad Kamal Hosny; 26 January 1943; Bulaq, Cairo, Kingdom of Egypt
- Died: 21 June 2001 (aged 58); Westminster, London, England
- Burial place: Cairo, Egypt
- Other name: Cinderella of the Screen
- Occupations: Actress; singer
- Years active: 1959–1991
- Notable work: Full list
- Spouses: Salah Kurayyem (m. 1968; div. 1969) Ali Badrakhan (m. 1970; div. 1981) Zaki Fatin Abdel Wahab (m. 1981; div. 1981) Maher Awad (m. 1987)
- Father: Mohammad Hosni
- Relatives: Nagat El-Sagheera (half-sister)

Soad Mohammad Kamal Hosny (Arabic: سُعاد حسني, pronounced [soˈʕæːd ˈħosni]; 26 January 1943 – 21 June 2001) was an Egyptian actress. She was known as the "Cinderella of the Screen" and one of the most influential actresses in the Middle East and the Arab world. She is generally regarded as one of Egypt's most iconic female performers of the 20th-century, who played leading roles for many of the country's top directors, in a career spanning 83 films between 1959 and 1991, garnering several national and international accolades.

Hosny was born in the Boulaq district of Cairo to an artistic family. Her father is Mohamed Hosni, who was one of the best Egyptian calligraphers. She is the sister of the singer Nagat El-Sagheera. She worked in the Egyptian Radio as a young child with Baba Sharo and was introduced for Film industry by Abdel Rahman El Khamisi. Her film debut was Hassan and Naima (1959), and she quickly rose to stardom at the end of the 1950s, performing in more than 83 films between 1959 and 1991 with nine films in the greatest 100 films in the history of Egyptian cinema.

A majority of her films were shot in the 1960s and 1970s. Her notable films include; Money and Women (1960), A Date at the Tower (1962), Too Young for Love (1966), Cairo 30 (1966), The Second Wife (1967), Sunset and Sunrise (1970), The Choice (1971), Those People of the Nile (1972), Where is My Mind? (1974), Amira, My Love (1974), Whom Should We Shoot? (1975), Karnak (1975), Shafika and Metwali (1979), The Savage (1979), People on the Top (1981), A Dinner Date (1981), Al Qadisiyya (1981), A Stranger in My House (1982), Love in a Jail Cell (1983) and The Hunger (1986). Her 1972 film Watch Out For Zouzou is widely considered her most famous film, to the point that many people gave her the nickname “Zouzou", her character's name. Her final screen appearance was in the 1991 film The Shepherd and the Women, directed by her ex-husband Ali Badrakhan.

== Early life ==
Soad Muhammad Kamal Hosny was born in Bulaq district in Cairo, Egypt, to Mohammad Hosni, a renowned calligrapher, and Gawhara Mohamed Hassan Saffour, a housewife. Her parents divorced and her mother married Abdul Monem Hafeez, with whom she had six more children, thus giving Soad and her two sisters no fewer than 14 half-siblings.

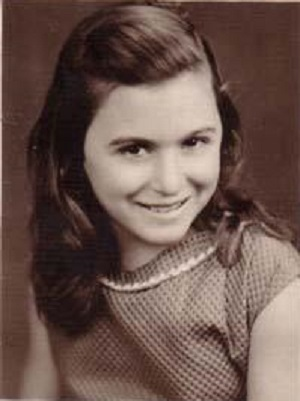
Hosny at the age of 10

Her father's household was known as "the artists' home" because leading artists from across the Arab world regularly visited Hosni's home in Cairo for tuition and social interaction with the master calligrapher. Her father, whose artistic output included the production of frames for the silent movies and book covers, was well known across the artistic community. A number of his children became performance artists. Soad's half-sister, Nagat, was an actress and singer. Her half-brother, Ezz Eddin Hosni (1927–2013), was a composer and taught Soad and Najat music and singing. Another sibling, Sami Hosni, became a cello player, jewellery designer, and calligrapher. Yet another brother, Farooq, was a painter and his daughter Samira was also an actress.

== Career ==
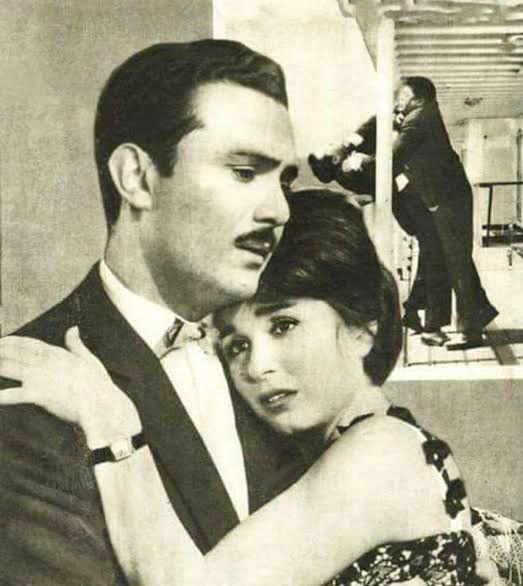
Soad Hosny with Salah Zulfikar in A Date at the Tower (1962)

At the age of three, she began her career when she sang in the popular Egyptian children's TV program, Papa Sharo, hosted by prominent kids' shows presenter Mohamed Shaaban. Her work included a wide range of genres, from light comedies and romances through to political satire. Her film debut was in Hassan and Nayima (1959). She is credited with acting in films with the most notable Egyptian film stars, such as Omar Sharif, Salah Zulfikar, Rushdy Abaza, and Shoukry Sarhan.

In the early 1960s, Hosny starred in A Rumor of Love (1960) alongside Omar Sharif and Youssef Wahbi. She also starred in Mafish Tafahom (1961), El-Do' el-Khaft (1961), El-Saferia Aziza (1961) alongside Shoukry Sarhan. She was also paired with Ahmed Mazhar in El-garema el-Dahka (1963). Other important film credits include her role in Hassan El-Imam's Money and Women (1960) opposite Salah Zulfikar, whom she was paired with for the second time in A Date at the Tower (1962) directed by Ezz El-Dine Zulficar. In 1964, she starred alongside Nadia Lutfi in Mahmoud Zulfikar's For Men Only, where she played a role of a girl disguised in a man's appearance to have the opportunity to work in an oil exploration project; the film was a box office hit. In 1966, she starred in 10 films including Mabka el-Oshak, His Excellency, The Ambassador, El-Talata Yhbonha and Leilat El Zefaf. In the same year, Hosny starred in Too Young for Love (1966) opposite Rushdy Abaza.

In 1970, she starred alongside Salah Zulfikar and Rushdy Abaza in the political film Sunset and Sunrise (1970) by Kamal El Sheikh. She worked in two films directed by Youssef Chahine during her career, the first one being The Choice (1970), and the second Those People of the Nile (1972) in which she was paired with Salah Zulfikar for the fourth time. One of her most well-known roles was that of a college student who fell in love with her professor in Hassan El Imam’s film Watch Out for ZouZou (1972). In 1974, she starred in Kamal El Sheikh's Whom Should We Shoot? (1974) alongside Mahmoud Yassin, whom she shared the lead with in Where is My Mind? (1974). Her next role was a student and political activist who was tortured in Karnak (1975), the film was based on the novel by Naguib Mahfouz.

In the films Shafika and Metwali (1979) with Ahmed Zaki and People on the Top (1981) with Nour El-Sherif, she transformed the musical numbers into scathing satires which gave voice to the oppressed. For this and her other hard-hitting, politically relevant roles, she was seen as part of the intelligentsia. She starred in A Dinner Date (1981), in which she played a dramatic role. She also starred in Al Qadisiyya (1981), The Suspect (1981), A Stranger in My House (1982), Love in a Jail Cell (1983) and The Hunger (1986).

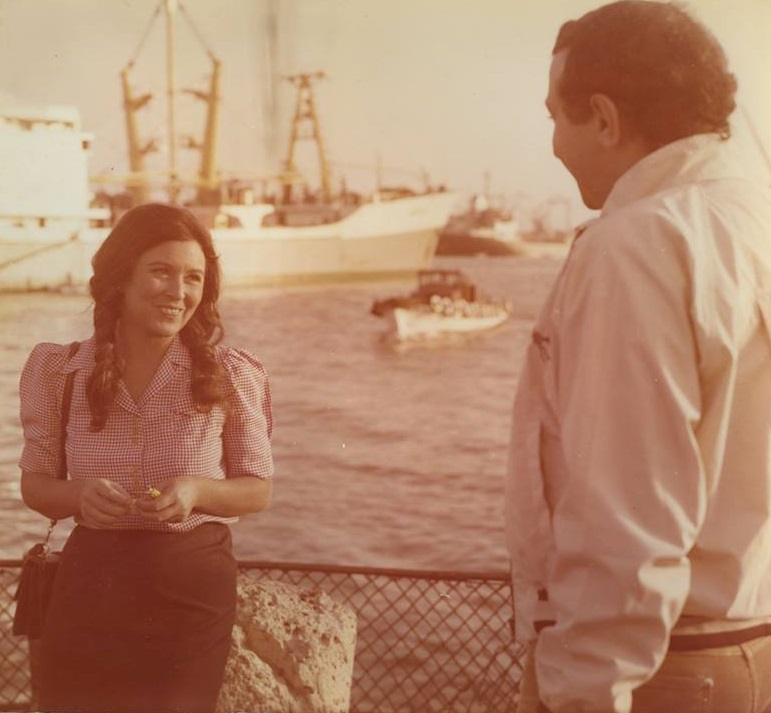
Soad Hosny and Nour El-Sherif in People on the Top (1981)

During her lifetime, she was known as the "Cinderella of the Screen". She starred in the films of every important Egyptian director during the 60s and 70s and played women in complex plots. In her later career, she played women who had been abused or victimized. Due to illness and health issues, she retired from acting in 1991. Hosny's final screen appearance was in The Shepherd and the Women (1991).

== Personal life ==
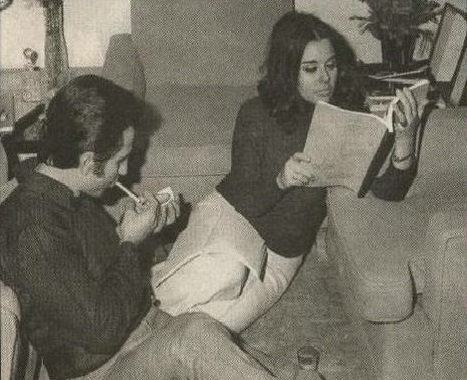
Soad Hosny with Ali Badrakhan

Soad Hosny was married four times. Around 1968, she was married to cinematographer Salah Kurayyem; the marriage lasted for approximately one year. In 1970, Hosny was married to the Egyptian film director Ali Badrakhan; this marriage lasted for approximately eleven years. She was then married to Zaki Fatin Abdel Wahab, son of Fateen Abdel Wahab and Leila Mourad in 1981. This marriage lasted only five months. Persistent rumors claim that her first marriage was to the actor and singer, Abdel Halim Hafez (1929–1977), popularly known as "Al Andaleeb al Asmar" [The Dark-skinned Nightingale], whom she is believed to have married in secret. However, her family have denied the veracity of such rumors.

She was romantically linked with various celebrities, including the Egyptian film star Abdel Halim Hafez. Despite never wearing a wedding dress in all her marriages, Hosni wore wedding dresses many times on screen through her films, and her first film husband was the Egyptian film star Salah Zulfikar in Money and Women of 1960. The rumor of her marriage to Abdel Halim Hafez was not the first in her life. In late 1962, a rumor was spread in the Egyptian press about her marriage to Salah Zulfikar, leading man and box-office star who was popularly known as "Fares al Ahlem" [Knight of Dreams], while filming with Zulfikar in A Date at the Tower. Filming of the film scenes began in the Cairo Tower, and the team continued for two weeks on board the ship Aida in the Mediterranean. After filming ended, the rumor of her marriage to Zulfikar spread in newspapers and magazines at the time. Zulfikar did not forget the nature of his previous work as a police officer and began with his sense of security to investigate the source of the rumor, to make sure that the lighting worker in the film crew was the owner of the rumor after a kiss was filmed between Zulfikar and Soad Hosny, where the kiss lasted for three minutes, until Zulfikar sensed it took them too long and told the cinematographer, "Stop", and so the worker built this rumor because of the shot, but this rumor was denied and later, the two film stars participated in more than one film together. Her fourth and final marriage was to screen writer Maher Awad.

== Death ==
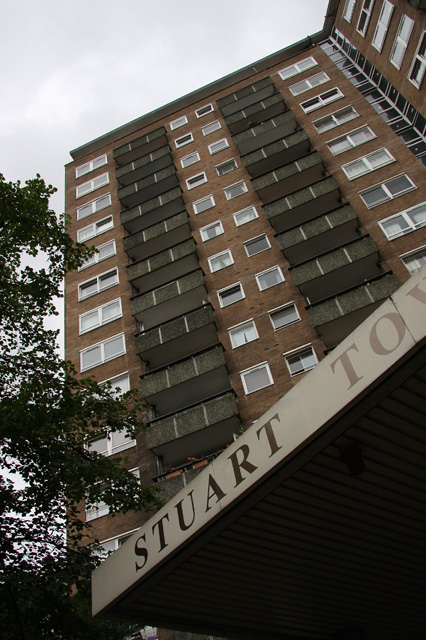
Stuart Tower in Westminster, England

On 21 June 2001, Soad Hosny died after falling from the balcony of her friend Nadia Yousri's apartment in Stuart Tower building in Westminster. Her death was surrounded by controversy, with authorities initially failing to provide details of how she fell; an omission that fueled media speculation and rumors that her death may have been a suicide or murder rather than accidental. Although British authorities ruled her death a suicide, the ruling was disputed by some due to allegations surrounding the circumstances of her death. Reports also claimed that Hosni had been working on memoirs that allegedly implicated senior Egyptian officials in a sex scandal. In March, an Egyptian judge suspended investigations into her death after a formal complaint was filed by her sister, who alleged that Egyptian government officials had been involved.

Soad's body was flown home to Cairo and her funeral there was attended by over 10,000 people. She was buried in a family's plot of land on the outskirts of Cairo. She had no children and was survived by her last husband, writer Maher Awad, whom she married in 1987.

Hosny was the second prominent Egyptian to die in mysterious "balcony deaths" in London. Like Hosny, the two others— El-Leithy Nassif (August 1973) and Ashraf Marwan (June 2007) had ties to the Egyptian security services and were either writing or planning to write memoirs.

== Awards ==
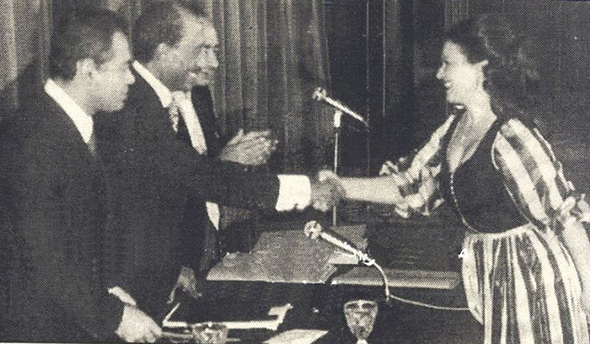
Soad Hosny shaking hands with President Anwar Sadat, c. 1979

Soad Hosny had won many awards, including the Best Actress Award from the National Festival in 1971, the Ministry of Culture Award for 5 times, the Egyptian Film Association Award for 5 times, the Alexandria International Film Festival best actress award, the Best Actress Award from the Cinema Art Association, and the Best Actress Award from the Ministry of Culture. Egyptian media in 1987, and a certificate of appreciation on Art Day in 1979 from President Anwar Sadat. At the 1980 State Film Awards, Hosni won the Best Actress Award for the movie The Savage.

== Legacy and image ==
Soad Hosny has been considered one of the most influential actresses in the Middle East and Arab World. Highly regarded for her range, versatility, and ability to play a wide range of characters—from comedic and lighthearted roles to dramatic and tragic ones, captivating the audiences with her charm, which would earn her the nickname "Cinderella of the Screen". Her fashion sense and style made her a fashion icon for many young girls during her time, and she has been considered a sex symbol.

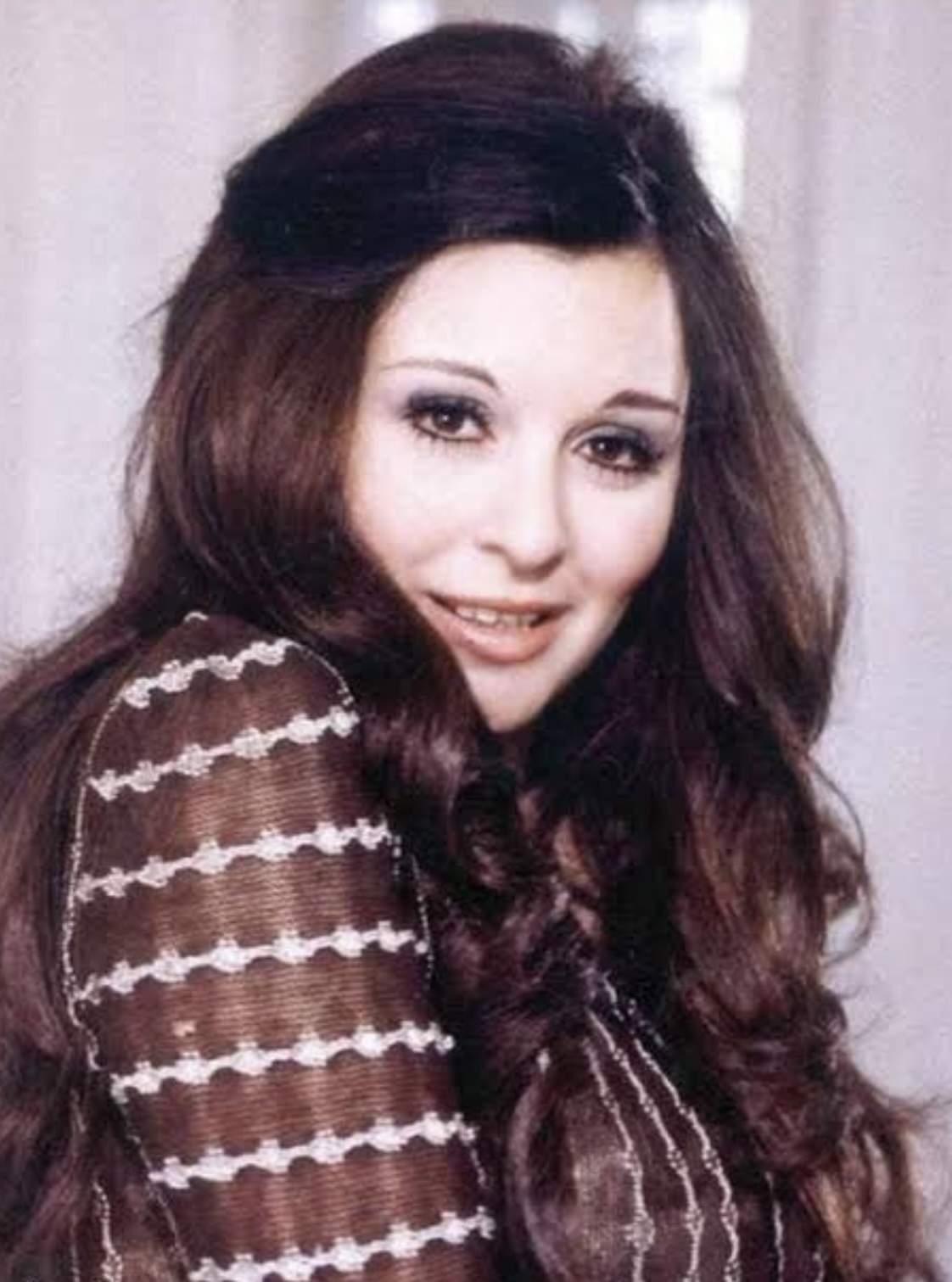
Hosny in 1980

In 2013, Lebanese filmmaker Rania Stephan used snippets from Hosny's films to re-tell Hosny's story and the history of Egyptian cinema in The Three Disappearances of Soad Hosni. It was featured in Berlin's Art Week. The Three Disappearances is an important archive, which while following the chronology of Soad Hosny's career, simultaneously documents the costumes, sets and styles used from the 1950s to the 1990s, a period that marked the peak and decline of Egyptian cinema.

One of Hosny's songs, "I'm going down to the Square" became a popular "anthem" during the 2011 Egyptian revolution.

== Filmography ==
Soad Hosny's film career lasted for 32 years. She is an icon in Egyptian film industry. She was a film, stage, television, and radio actor. She appeared in more than 80 films and sang on Egyptian radio.

== See also ==
- List of Egyptian films of the 1960s
- List of Egyptian films of the 1970s

== Sources ==
- Terri Ginsberg, Chris Lippard, 2010: Historical Dictionary of Middle Eastern Cinema, Scarecrow Press.
- Ashraf Gharib, 2001: Soad Hosni: Al-Hulm Al-Dai (Soad Hosni: The Lost Dream). (Cf. "Return of Soad". Al-Ahram Weekly. 11–17 November 2001. Archived from the original on 18 October 2012.)
- Mohamed Soweid, 2004: Cabaret Suad, Beirut: Dar al-Adab. (Cf. "The cornflake predicament". Al-Ahram Weekly. 16–22 June 2005. Archived from the original on 14 March 2012.)
