= Youssef Chahine filmography =

Youssef Chahine (Arabic: يوسف شاهين [ˈjuːsɪf ʃæˈhiːn]; 25 January 1926 – 27 July 2008) was an Egyptian film director. He was active in the Egyptian film industry from 1950 until his death. He directed twelve films that were listed in the Top 100 Egyptian films list. A winner of the Cannes 50th Anniversary Award (for lifetime achievement).

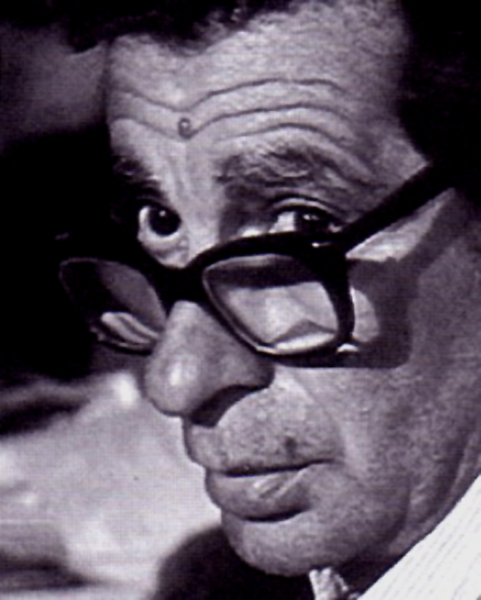

Youssef Chahine is credited for directing five films starring Salah Zulfikar including significant productions such as Saladin (1963), The Nile and the Life (1968) and Those People of the Nile (1972) and also credited with discovering Omar Sharif, whose first starring role was in Chahine's film The Blazing Sun (1954). A well-regarded director with critics, he was often present at film festivals during the earlier decades of his work. Chahine gained his largest international audiences as one of the co-directors of 11'9"01 September 11 (2002).

== Filmography ==
#	Year	Arabic Title	Translation	Transliteration	Notes
1	1950	بابا أمين	Papa Amin	Bābā Amīn	
2	1951	ابن النيل	Son of the Nile	Ibn al-Nīl	
3	1952	المهرج الكبير	The Great Clown	Al-Muharrig al-Kabīr	
4	1953	سيدة القطار	Lady of the Train	Sayedat al-Qitar	
5	1953	نساء بلا رجال	Women without Men	Nisaa bila Regal	
6	1954	صراع فى الوادي	Struggle in the Valley	Ṣirāʿ fī al-Wādī	Aka The Blazing Sun
7	1954	شيطان الصحراء	The Desert Devil	Shaitan al Sahraa	
8	1956	صراع فى الميناء	Struggle in the Pier	Ṣirāʿ fī al-Mīnāʾ	Aka Dark Waters
9	1957	ودعت حبك	Farewell to Your Love	Wadda'tu Hobbaka	
10	1957	إنت حبيبي	You're My Love	Inta Ḥabībī	
11	1958	باب الحديد	Cairo Station	Bāb al-Ḥadīd (The Iron Gate)	
12	1958	جميلة بوحريد	Jamila, the Algerian	Djamila Bouhired	
13	1959	حب إلى الأبد	Forever Yours	Hobb lel Abad	Entered into the 1st Moscow International Film Festival.
14	1960	بين ايديك	In Your Hands	Bein Edeik	
15	1960	نداء العشاق	A Lover's Call	Nidaa al Oushaak	
16	1961	رجل في حياتي	A Man in My Life	Rajul fe Haiaty	
17	1963	الناصر صلاح الدين	Saladin the Victorious	Al-Nāṣir Ṣalāḥ al-Dīn	Entered into the 3rd Moscow International Film Festival.
18	1964	فجر يوم جديد	Dawn of a New Day	Fajr Yawm Jadīd	
19	1965	بياع الخواتم	The Ring Salesman	Bīyā al-Khawātim	Aka Auliban, the Seller of Jokes.; Starring Lebanese legend Fairuz.; Based on the musical of 1964.
20	1966	رمال من ذهب	Golden Sands	Rimal min Thahab	
21	1967	عيد الميرون	The Feast of Mairun	Eid al Mairun	Short film
22	1968	النيل الحياة	The Nile and the Life	Al Nil wal Hayah	
23	1969	الأرض	The Land	Al-Ard	
24	1970	الإختيار	The Choice	Al-Ikhtiyār	
25	1972	سلوى الفتاة الصغيرة التى تكلم الأبقار	Salwa the Little Girl who Talks to Cows	Salwā al-Fatā al-Saghīra allatī Takallam al-Abqār	Short film; Aka Salwa
26	1972	الناس والنيل	Those People of the Nile	Al-Nas wal Nil	
27	1973	العصفور	The Sparrow	Al-ʿUṣfūr	
28	1973	انطلاق	Forward We Go	Intilak	Documentary
29	1976	عودة الابن الضال	Return of The Prodigal Son	ʿAwdat al-Ibn al-Ḍāl	
30	1978	إسكندرية... ليه؟	Alexandria... Why?	Iskandariyya... līh?	
31	1982	حدوتة مصرية	An Egyptian Tale	Hadduta Miṣriyya	
32	1985	وداعًا بونابرت	Adieu Bonaparte	Wadān Būnābart	
33	1986	اليوم السادس	The Sixth Day	Al-Yawm al-Sadis	
34	1989	إسكندرية كمان وكمان	Alexandria Again and Forever	Iskandariyya Kamān wa Kamān	
35	1991	القاهرة منورة بأهلها	Cairo as Told by Chahin	Al-Qāhira Munawwara bi-Ahliha	TV documentary
36	1994	المهاجر	The Emigrant	Al-Muhajir	
37	1997	المصير	The Destiny	Al-Maṣīr	
38	1998	كلها خطوة	It's Only a Step	Kolaha Khatwa	Short film
39	1999	الأخر	The Other	Al-Akhar	
40	2001	سكوت ح نصور	Silence, We're Rolling	Sukūt Ḥanṣawwar	
41	2002	11, سبتمبر	September, 11th		Aka 11'09"01 Eleven Minutes, Nine Seconds, One Image
42	2004	إسكندرية-نيويورك	Alexandria-New York	Iskandariyya-New York	
43	2007	هي فوضى..؟	Is This Chaos..?	Hiya Fawḍā...?	Premiere at the Venice Film Festival

== See also ==
- Lists of Egyptian films
