= List of Egyptian films of 1969 =

A list of films produced in Egypt in 1969. For an A-Z list of films currently on Wikipedia, see Category:Egyptian films.

== 1969 ==
Title	Director	Cast	Genre	Notes
1969
El Ard (The Land)	Youssef Chahine	Mahmoud el-Meliguy, Ezzat El Alaili, Yehia Chahine	Drama	Entered into the 1970 Cannes Film Festival
Shey Min El Khouf (A Taste of Fear)	Hussein Kamal	Shadia, Mahmoud Morsy, Yehia Chahine	Drama	Entered into the 6th Moscow International Film Festival
Sabah El Kheir ya Zawgaty El Aziza (Good Morning, My Dear Wife)	Abdel Moneim Shokry	Salah Zulfikar, Nelly, Taheyya Kariokka	Comedy	
The Night of Counting the Years	Shadi Abdel Salam	Nadia Lutfi, Ahmed Marei, Ahmed Hegazi	Drama	
Women's Markets (Souq Al-Hareem)	Youssef Marzouk	Salah Zulfikar, Mariam Fakhr Eddine	Drama, Comedy	
