= Alexandria Again and Forever =

Alexandrie encore et toujours a.k.a. Alexandria again and forever or Alexandria again and again according to its Egyptian name
- Directed by: Youssef Chahine
- Produced by: French Ministry of Culture, La Sept, Ministere des Affaires Etrangeres, Misr International Films, Pa
- Starring: Hussein Fahmy, Yousra
- Distributed by: Africa Film Library/M-Net
- Release date: 1989
- Running time: 106 minutes
- Country: Egypt
- Language: Arabic

Alexandria Again and Forever or Alexandria again and again as its Egyptian name (Arabic: إسكندريه كمان وكمان, translit.Iskandria Kaman wa Kaman, French: Alexandrie Encore et Toujours) is a 1990 Egyptian film directed by Youssef Chahine.

It is the third entry in a series of four films by Chahine. This 104-minute-long film is mainly in Arabic, with English-language subtitles. It was preceded by the films Alexandria... Why? (1978) An Egyptian Story (1982) and followed by Alexandria... New York (2004). The film was selected as the Egyptian entry for the Best Foreign Language Film at the 63rd Academy Awards, but was not accepted as a nominee.

== Synopsis ==
Following a violent outburst with Amr, his favorite actor, the director Yehia Eskandarany (Youssef Chahine) is forced to put his career under scrutiny. Nothing looks familiar any longer. His country and the African cinema he loves so much, also look strange. Little by little, while remembering his first film with Amr, Yehia traces the infiltration of the influential petro-dollar into the Egyptian cinema industry. But was it really money that caused the rift between him and Amr? Or was it the strikingly beautiful Nadia? The film features (Salah Zulfikar), (Soad Hosny) and (Adel Emam) among others in cameo appearances by Egyptian actors.

== Cast ==
- Hussein Fahmy
- Amr Abdel Galil
- Yousra
- Hesham Selim
- Tahia Carioca
- Ragaa Hussein
- Abla Kamel
- Youssef Chahine
- Mohamed Henedy
- Nahla Salama
- Zaki Fatin Abdel Wahab
- Tawfik El Kurdi
- Menha El Batrawy
- Hassan El Adl

=== Guests of the film ===
- Soad Hosny
- Salah Zulfikar
- Adel Emam

== See also ==
- Youssef Chahine filmography
- List of Egyptian films of the 1990s
- List of submissions to the 63rd Academy Awards for Best Foreign Language Film
- List of Egyptian submissions for the Academy Award for Best Foreign Language Film
