= List of Egyptian films of 1972 =

A list of films produced in Egypt in 1972. For an A-Z list of films currently on Wikipedia, see Category:Egyptian films.

Title	Director	Cast	Genre	Notes
Regal bila Malameh (Featureless Men)	Mahmoud Zulfikar	Salah Zulfikar, Nadia Lutfi, Mahmoud El-Meliguy	Drama	
Al Nass Wal Nil (Those People of the Nile)	Youssef Chahine	Salah Zulfikar, Soad Hosny		
Adwaa Al-Madina (City Lights)	Fatin Abdel Wahab	Shadia, Ahmed Mazhar, Hassan Mostafa, Abdel Moneim Ibrahim, Adel Emam, Samir Ghanem, George Sidhom	Comedy / musical	
Da’awa Lel Hayah (A Call for Life)	Medhat Bakeer	Salah Zulfikar, Mervat Amin	Drama	
Emberatoriet Meem (Empire M)	Hussein Kamal	Faten Hamama, Ahmed Mazhar	Drama	Entered into the 8th Moscow International Film Festival
Khally Balak Min ZouZou (Watch Out for ZouZou)	Hassan Al Imam	Souad Hosni, Hussein Fahmy		
