= List of Egyptian films of 1951 =

A list of films produced in Egypt in 1951. For an A-Z list of films currently on Wikipedia, see Category:Egyptian films.

Title	Director	Cast	Genre	Notes
Ibn el-Nil (Son of the Nile)	Youssef Chahine	Faten Hamama, Yehia Chahine, Shukry Sarhan	Drama	Entered into the 1952 Cannes Film Festival
Lak Yawm Ya Zalem (Your Day Will Come)	Salah Abu Seif	Mahmoud el-Meliguy, Faten Hamama	Drama	
Ana al-Madi (I'm the Past)	Ezzel Dine Zulficar	Imad Hamdi, Faten Hamama, Farid Shawqi	Crime	
Lailat gharam (A Night of Love)	Ahmed Badrakhan	Mahmoud El-Meliguy, Mariam Fakhr Eddine, Abbas Fares	Drama	Entered into the 1952 Cannes Film Festival
