= List of Egyptian films of 1959 =

A list of films produced in Egypt in 1959. For an A-Z list of films currently on Wikipedia, see Category:Egyptian films.

Title	Director	Cast	Genre	Notes
Ana Horra (I Am Free)	Salah Abu Seif	Lobna Abdel Aziz, Shoukry Sarhan	Drama	
Nesaa Moharramat (Forbidden Women)	Mahmoud Zulfikar	Salah Zulfikar, Huda Sultan	Drama / romance	
Doaa al-Karawan (The Nightingale's Prayer)	Henry Barakat	Faten Hamama, Ahmed Mazhar	Drama	Entered into the 10th Berlin International Film Festival
Bein El Atlal (Among the Ruins)	Ezzel Dine Zulficar	Faten Hamama, Emad Hamdy, Salah Zulfikar	Romance	
Hassan and Nayima	Henry Barakat	Muharram Fouad, Soad Hosny	Drama / romance	Entered into the 9th Berlin International Film Festival
Hubb lel-abad (Forever Yours)	Youssef Chahine	Mahmoud el-Meliguy, Nadia Lutfi, Ahmed Ramzy	Drama	Entered into the 1st Moscow International Film Festival
Hob hatta Al-Ibada (Love and Adoration)	Hassan Al Imam	Salah Zulfikar, Taheyya Kariokka	Drama / romance	
Sira' fi al-Nil (Struggle on the Nile)	Atef Salem	Rushdi Abaza, Hind Rostom, Omar Sharif	Drama	
Al Mar'a Al Maghoula (The Unknown Woman)	Mahmoud Zulfikar	Shadia, Emad Hamdy, Shoukry Sarhan	Drama	
