= Slaves of the Body =

- عبيد الجسد
- Directed by: Kamal Attia
- Starring: Huda Sultan, Farid Shawqi, Mahmoud Al Meleji, Tawfik El Deken, Shafik Nour El Din
- Release date: 22 January 1962
- Running time: 105 minutes
- Country: Egypt
- Language: Arabic

Slaves of the Body (Arabic: عبيد الجسد, "Abid el gassad") is a 1962 film directed by Kamal Attia and starring Huda Sultan, Farid Shawqi, Mahmoud Al Meleji, Tawfik El Deken, and Shafik Nour El Din.

== Plot ==
The film revolves around Abd al-Fattah, who steals a bag of money belonging to "Uncle Amin" while he is outside a shop where the saleswoman "Samia" works. Samia photographs the theft and decides to threaten the thief to return the bag, or else she will report him to the police. A disagreement arises between "Ali" and his fellow thieves regarding returning the bag to its owner. The film follows the development of a love story between Ali and Samia, who go out together and eventually decide to get married, under the condition that Ali leaves his life of crime behind. Samia then works as a treasury employee at a small shop.

After "Ahmed" is released from prison, he meets his old friend "Ali" and discovers that his wife is actually his ex-wife, who was previously named "Wafaa" and had run away from his home. Ahmed threatens to expose her for being married to two men at the same time. To escape this situation, Wafaa decides to kill him. However, the police manage to chase and kill Ahmed, and her husband forgives her past.

== Cast ==
- Huda Sultan as Samia/Wafaa
- Mahmoud Al Meleji as Ahmed Hassan
- Farid Shawqi as Ali Abd al-Fattah
- Tawfik El Deken as a member of Ali Abd al-Fattah's gang
- Shafik Nour El Din as Uncle Amin
- Zahia Ayoub as young Layla Ali Abd al-Fattah
- Zeinat Olwi as a dancer
- Abdel Hamid Badawi as Uncle Refa'i Al-Farash
- Fathia Shahin as the superintendent
- Mohsen Hosny as a member of Ali Abd al-Fattah's gang
- Abdul Ghani Al-Najdi as the jeweler
- El Tawky Tawfik as a gang member
