= Ragaa Hussein =

Egyptian actress (1937–2022)

- رجاء حسين
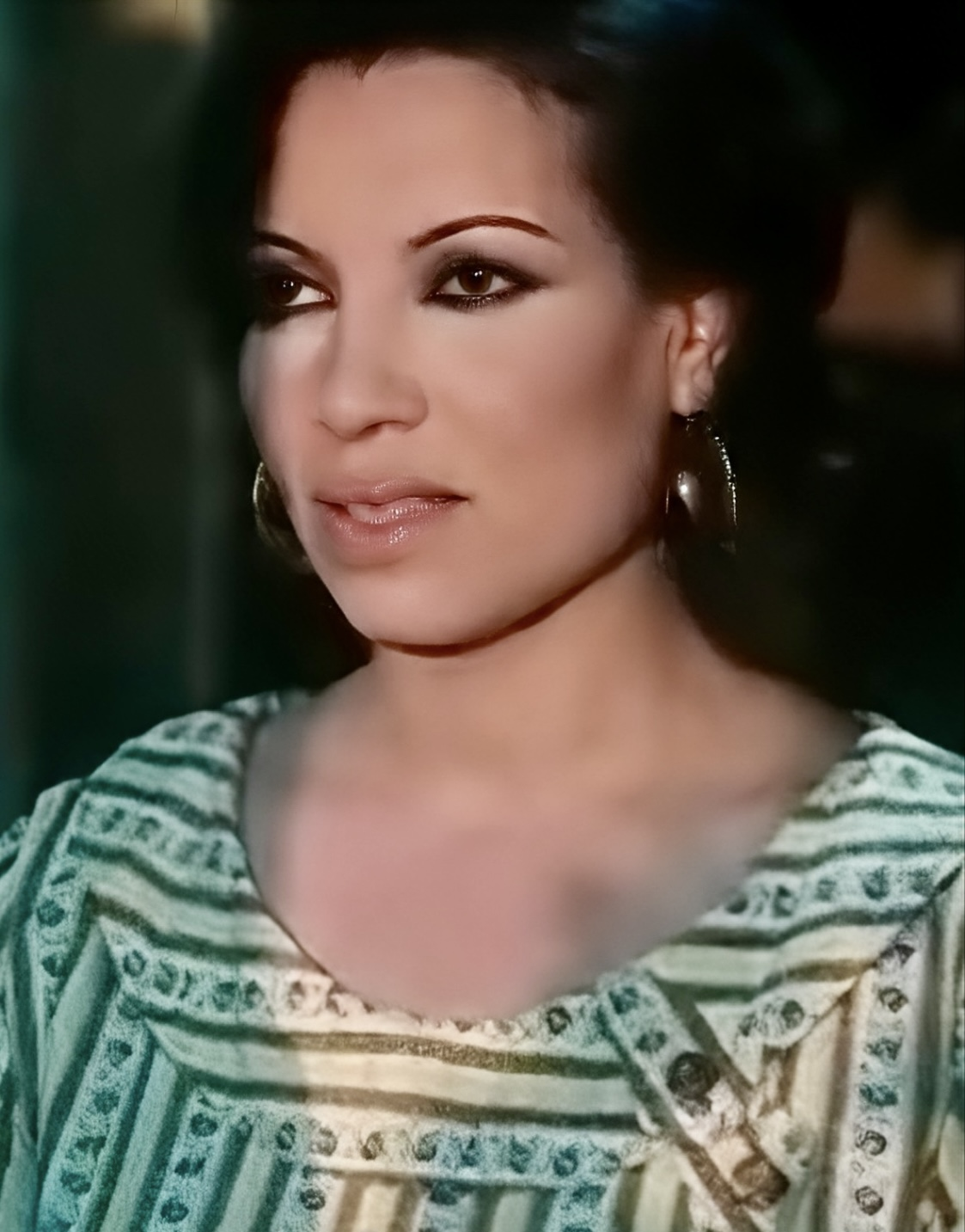
- Ragaa Hussein in 1976
- Born: Ragaa Hussein; 7 November 1937; Cairo, Kingdom of Egypt
- Died: 9 August 2022 (aged 84); Cairo, Egypt
- Occupation: Actress
- Years active: 1954–2017

Ragaa Hussein (7 November 1937 – 9 August 2022) was an Egyptian actress. She was a versatile actress who performed in cinema, theatre, and TV series for over 60 years.

== Early life ==
Ragaa Hussein was born on 7 November 1937 in Qalyubiyya Governorate, in the Nile Delta region of Egypt.

== Acting career ==
Ragaa Hussein began her artistic career in 1954. In 1958, she joined the El Rihany theaterical troupe established by Naguib el-Rihani in Cairo in the late 1910s. She worked on a number of radio and television programmes. She also acted in the Egyptian classic TV dramas and other TV series. During her long film career, she made more appearances in the movies directed by Egyptian film director Youssef Chahine. Some of these movies include Warm Nights (1961), Mouths and Rabbits (1977), I Want a Solution (1975), The Return of the Prodigal Son (1976), Money and Women (1960), An Egyptian Story (1982), Alexandria Again and Forever (1989), and Nawara (2015).

== Personal life ==
Ragaa Hussein married Saif Abdel Rahman, an actor and producer.

== Selected filmography ==
- Money and Women (1960)
- Warm Nights (1961)
- I Want a Solution (1975)
- The Return of the Prodigal Son (1976)
- Mouths and Rabbits (1977)
- An Egyptian Story (1982)
- Alexandria Again and Forever (1989)
- Nawara (2015)

== Death ==
Ragaa Hussein died on 9 August 2022 in Cairo, Egypt, following a prolonged illness.

== Honour ==
In 2020, Ragaa Hussein was honoured during the Egyptian Theatre Day celebrations to recognize her contributions. She was also honoured at the 24th edition of the Egyptian National Film Festival held in May 2022.
