= An Egyptian Story =

- Directed by: Youssef Chahine
- Written by: Youssef Chahine
- Produced by: Youssef Chahine
- Starring: Nour El-Sherif; Yousra; Ragaa Hussein; Mohamed Mounir
- Cinematography: Mohsen Nasr
- Edited by: Rashida Abdel Salam
- Release date: 1982
- Running time: 115 minutes
- Country: Egypt
- Language: Egyptian Arabic

An Egyptian Story (Egyptian Arabic: حدوته مصريه, translit. Hadduta masriyya) is a 1982 Egyptian drama film directed by Youssef Chahine. It was entered into the main competition at the 39th edition of the Venice Film Festival.

== Plot ==
The film is essentially a fictional biography of a self-centred, chain-smoking, highly-strung, radical realist film-maker named Yehia Choukry Mourad. It opens with him having a heart attack while directing a film. He is convinced to go to London for diagnosis and, subsequently, a heart bypass. The day before the operation, he spends time with his chauffeur. The film was daring for implying a homosexual attraction between the two men. Homoerotic tension was created by knowing glances that are exchanged between Yehia and the taxi driver.

Once Yehia is put under anaesthetic, the action shifts to a surreal, dreamlike court case held within Yehia's own chest cavity (the roof-beams of the court-room, for example, are Yehia's ribs). Yehia's inner child is on trial: feeling unloved by the adult Yehia, this child is attempting to kill Yehia. The child's witness stand comprises clear plastic tubes into which he drops white crystals, symbolising Yehia's arteries and the cholesterol that is choking them. As different witnesses speak during the chaotic court scenes, the film presents different flashbacks to Yehia's life, starting with his unfair treatment by a bitter, Catholic primary-school teacher.

The flashbacks position Yehia at some key moments in Egyptian history: participating as a youth in riots against British forces in Egypt; starring in and directing Cairo Station; fruitlessly seeking Euro-American approval for his work at the Cannes Film Festival and in New York, attending the inaugural Moscow International Film Festival; and making a film about the Battle of Algiers, Jamila, the Algerian. The film later portrays Yehia getting into trouble with censors over his attempt to get funding for The Sparrow.

Yehia's relationships with his mother, sister, and wife Amal are a key theme in both the flashbacks and the court scenes. Insofar as they have mistreated Yehia, the film suggests that these women's behaviours arises from their own experience of and participation in patriarchal oppression. Yehia's mother is forced to marry and have children young; in turn, she imposes the same strictures on her daughter; and Yehia himself refuses to allow his daughter to pursue a love-marriage just before his heart-attack. Amal is similarly confined by motherhood and Yehia's own infantility.

The film ends with Yehia's inner child being condemned to death and plunging into an artery with a knife to attempt to kill Yehia. The surgeon operating on Yehia succeeds in extracting the inner child, however, and Yehia is saved. On coming to from his anaesthetic, Yehia meets his inner child, makes peace with him, and the inner child merges back into Yehia. Here the film ends.

== Style ==
The film is in colour, but frequently splices in archive footage, mostly in black and white, forcibly integrating a documentary perspective on Egyptian history. The main character, Yehia, often alludes to Shakespeare's Hamlet. Yehia is the same character as the one who appears in the 1979 film Alexandria... Why?. While the film's frame narrative and its flashbacks are shot in a realist mode, the courtroom drama within Yehia's chest is dream-like and highly symbolic.

== Cast ==
- Nour El-Sherif – Yehia
- Yousra – Amal
- Ragaa Hussein
- Mohamed Mounir
- Seif El Dine
- Hanan – Nadia child
- Leila Hamada – Nadia young girl
- Magda El-Khatib – Nadia
- Ragaa El Geddawy
- Mimi Chakib – the mother
- Oussama Nadir – Yehia as Child
- Mohsen Mohieddin – Yehia as Young Man
- Soheir El Monasterli
- Andrew Dinwoodie
- Abdel Hadi Anwar
