= Those People of the Nile =

- Arabic: الناس والنيل
- Directed by: Youssef Chahine
- Written by: Nikolai Ekk
- Screenplay by: Hassan Fouad
- Starring: Soad Hosny; Salah Zulfikar
- Cinematography: Shlenkov; Peter Chefko
- Edited by: Rachida Abdel Salam
- Music by: Aram Khachaturian
- Production company: Cairo Cinema • Mosfilm
- Distributed by: General Egyptian Corporation for Cinema Production
- Release date: 1972
- Running time: 105 minutes
- Countries: Egypt, Soviet Union
- Languages: Arabic, Russian

Those People of the Nile (Arabic: الناس والنيل, French: Ces gens du Nil, translit: Elnas w Elnil or El Nas w el Nil , aliases: People of the Nile) is a 1972 drama film directed by Youssef Chahine. It stars Soad Hosny and Salah Zulfikar. The film is co-produced by companies in Egypt and the Soviet Union.

== Plot ==
Set during the diversion of the Nile current in 1964 during the building of the High Dam. The foreground of the film shows Yehia as a worker in the high dam project. Later, we will understand that Yehia is not a real worker but a committed writer, tired by years of activism. Because of this past and this fatigue, the young girl from a good family with whom he falls in love, and who loves him, finally leaves him. Because she doesn't want a worn-out man. But Yehia is focused on covering the secrets of the huge project. And the rest of personalities begin to remember the past, through the story of Amin, the doctor who joins the dam to serve its staff, his wife Nadia who refuses to move to Aswan with him, and the Russian engineer, Alex, whose wife cannot tolerate life in Egypt.

== Cast ==
- Soad Hosny as Nadia
- Salah Zulfikar as Yehia
- Ezzat El Alaili as Amin
- Mahmoud El-Meliguy as Nadia's father
- Igor Vladimirov
- Vladimir Ivashov
- Madiha Salem
- Valentina Kutsenko
- Inna Fyodorova
- Sveltana Zhgun
- Tawfik El-Deken
- Saif Abdel Rahman
- Fatma Emara
- Valentina

== Production ==
The film was joint Egyptian-Soviet production as a sign of friendship between the two states at the time.

Youssef Chahine has diverted diplomatic material into poetic and lyrical material. And throughout the film, this important question: where does this energy come from? "We will change the course of history as we have changed the course of the world's greatest river." That kind of feeling always makes a movie. And it is visible that Chahine believed in his country's capabilities to build this huge project, the High Dam.

== See also ==
- Son of the Nile
- The Nile and the Life
- Soad Hosny filmography
- Salah Zulfikar filmography
- Youssef Chahine filmography
- List of Egyptian films of 1972
