= Dawn of a New Day =

Dawn of a New Day may refer to:

- Dawn of a New Day (Crystal Shawanda album)
- Dawn of a New Day (O'Donel Levy album)
- Dawn of a New Day (film), 1965 Egyptian film
