= List of Egyptian films of the 1950s =

Below are lists of films produced in Egypt in the 1950s.

- List of Egyptian films of 1950
- List of Egyptian films of 1951
- List of Egyptian films of 1952
- List of Egyptian films of 1953
- List of Egyptian films of 1954
- List of Egyptian films of 1955
- List of Egyptian films of 1956
- List of Egyptian films of 1957
- List of Egyptian films of 1958
- List of Egyptian films of 1959
