= Warm Nights =

Warm Nights may refer to:

- Warm Nights (album), a 1996 album by Robert Forster
- Warm Nights (film), a 1961 Egyptian film

== See also ==
- Warm Nights on a Slow Moving Train, a 1988 Australian film
- "Warm Night", a song by The Concretes
