= Aida Kamel =

Egyptian actress (1931–2020)

- Born: 1931; Egypt
- Died: September 7, 2020 (aged 88–89)
- Occupation: Actress

Aida Kamel (Arabic: عايدة كامل; 1931 – September 7, 2020) was an Egyptian actress.

== Biography ==
She studied radio at the university and obtained a bachelor's degree. She has worked in cinema since the early fifties. Among her films are: Sit El Hassan, The Melody of Eternity, Always With You, The empty pillow, Ismail Yiss in Al-Tayaran, Featureless Men, Alexandria... Why?. Since the late sixties, she also participated in television dramas like Al Raqam Al Maghool, Bein Kasserine, The Judiciary in Islam and Huanem Garden City.

Kamel died in a hospital in Cairo on September 7, 2020, at the age of 89, after a long illness.
