= Forbidden Women (1959 film) =

1959 film directed by Mahmoud Zulfikar

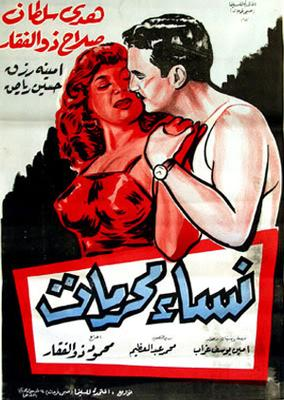
- Theatrical release poster
- Arabic: نساء محرمات
- Directed by: Mahmoud Zulfikar
- Written by: Amin Youssef Ghorab
- Screenplay by: Mahmoud Zulfikar
- Produced by: Abbas Helmi
- Starring: Salah Zulfikar; Huda Sultan
- Cinematography: Mohamed Abdel Azim; Adel Abdel Azim
- Edited by: Albert Naguib
- Music by: Andre Ryder
- Production company: Union Films (Abbas Helmi)
- Distributed by: Al-Sharq Film Distribution Company
- Release date: 12 October 1959 (Egypt)
- Running time: 120 minutes
- Country: Egypt
- Language: Egyptian Arabic

Forbidden Women (aliases: Nisa Muharramat Arabic: نساء محرمات, translit.Nesaa Moharramat or Nessa Muharramat) is a 1959 Egyptian drama film directed by Mahmoud Zulfikar. It is written by Amin Youssef Ghorab and Mahmoud Zulfikar. It stars Salah Zulfikar and Huda Sultan. The film is produced by Union Films (Abbas Helmi) and distributed by Al-Sharq Film Distribution Company.

== Plot ==
Tawfiq is a wealthy man who works as a contractor. He was married to Hafiza and they did not have any children, so he adopts Ahmed, who manages his business later. Ahmed became involved in an affair with a playful woman named Mahasin. By chance, Tawfiq meets Mahasen through one of the matchmakers. The situation gets worse when Mahasen becomes pregnant with Ahmed at the same time which he desires her daughter, Laila, without knowing that she is Mahasen's daughter.

== Crew ==
- Writer: Amin Youssef Ghorab
- Screenwriter: Mahmoud Zulfikar
- Director: Mahmoud Zulfikar
- Produced by: Union Films (Abbas Helmy)
- Distribution: Al Sharq Film Distribution Company
- Soundtrack: Andre Ryder
- Cinematographer: Mohamed Abdel Azim, Adel Abdel Azim
- Editor: Albert Naguib

== Cast ==
- Salah Zulfikar as Ahmed
- Huda Sultan as Mahasin
- Amina Rizk as Hafida
- Hussein Riad as Tawfiq
- Amaal Farid as Lily
- Widad Hamdi as Zakia
- Hussein Aser as Salem Effendi
- Fifi Saeed as Halima
- Mohsen Hassanein
- Hussein Ismail

== See also ==
- List of Egyptian films of 1959
- List of Egyptian films of the 1950s
