= The Land (1969 film) =

1970 drama film by Youssef Chahine

- Directed by: Youssef Chahine
- Written by: Abd al-Rahman Sharqawi; Hassan Fuad
- Starring: Mahmoud El-Meliguy Yehia Chahine Ezzat El Alaili Hamdy Ahmed
- Cinematography: Abdelhalim Nasr
- Edited by: Rashida Abdel Salam
- Music by: Ali Ismail
- Release date: 1970
- Running time: 130 minutes
- Country: Egypt
- Language: Egyptian Arabic

The Land (Arabic: الأرض, translit. al-ʿarḍ) is a 1970 Egyptian drama film directed by Youssef Chahine, based on a popular novel by Abd al-Rahman Sharqawi. The film narrates the conflict between Egyptian peasants and their landlord in the 1930s, and explores the complex relation between individual interests and collective responses to oppression. It was entered into the 1970 Cannes Film Festival.

== Cast ==
- Mahmoud El-Meliguy as Mohamed Abu Swelam
- Yehia Chahine as Hassuna
- Ezzat El Alaili as Abd El-Hadi
- Hamdy Ahmed as Mohammad Effendi
- Tewfik El Dekn as Khedr
- Salah El-Saadany as Elwani
- Ali El Scherif as Diab
- Nagwa Ibrahim as Wassifa
