= Jamila, the Algerian =

1958 film

- جميلة
- Directed by: Youssef Chahine
- Written by: Abd al-Rahman Sharqawi; Ali al-Zarqani; Naguib Mahfouz; Yusuf Sibai; Wagih Nagib
- Produced by: Magda
- Starring: Magda; Salah Zulfikar; Ahmed Mazhar
- Cinematography: Abdel Aziz Fahmy
- Edited by: Muhamad Abbas
- Production company: Magda Films
- Distributed by: Magda Films
- Release date: 1958
- Running time: 120 minutes
- Country: Egypt
- Language: Arabic

Jamila, the Algerian (Arabic: جميلة) is a 1958 Egyptian historical film about one of the most important figures in the history of Algeria, Djamila Bouhired. The film was directed and produced by Youssef Chahine and written by Abd al-Rahman Sharqawi, Ali al-Zarqani, and Naguib Mahfouz. It is regarded as not only highlighting the story of an important female revolutionary, but also showing the struggle of the Algerian people against the French occupation. The film stars Magda, Salah Zulfikar and Ahmed Mazhar in the leading roles.

Jamila, the Algerian is the first and only multimedia narrative to focus solely on the role of Algerian women in the 1954 revolution. The film was released only a year after the torture and arrest of Djamila Bouhired, and it was banned by the Algerian government for decades. Despite this, Chahine's first explicitly political film managed to galvanize wide solidarity with the Algerian resistance from across the Arab World, starting in Egypt. Jamila, the Algerian is listed in the top 100 films in history of Egyptian Cinema.

== Plot ==
DJamila is a young Algerian woman living with her brother Hadi and uncle Mustafa in the Casbah neighborhood of Algiers during the French occupation of Algeria. as she sees the full extent of injustice, tyranny, and cruelty unleashed on her compatriots at the hands of the French soldiers. Although early on she questions whether her country's resources truly belong to the people of Algeria, Djamila's nationalist spirit is truly awakened when she witnesses French forces invade her university and attempt to arrest her classmate Amina, due to her involvement with an Algerian resistance organization, before Amina commits suicide through ingesting poison. Soon after, prominent Algerian guerrilla leader Yusef takes refuge in her home, prompting further intrigue by Djamila. Only then does she realize that her friend Azzam and her uncle Mustafa is a part of this anti-colonial network of rebel fighters.

After insisting on joining the ranks of Algerian guerrilla fighters, her uncle connects her with the National Liberation Front (FLN). A series of events illustrate Jamila's participation in militant operations against the French before she is eventually wounded and captured by the French Colonel Bigeard. The majority of the remainder of the film focuses on the physical and psychological torture she endures for refusing to give the names of the other guerrilla fighters. Ultimately, despite the efforts of her French lawyer, Djamila is sentenced to death following her violent interrogation.

== Cast ==
- Magda as Djamila Bouhired
- Salah Zulfikar as Azzam
- Ahmed Mazhar as Yusuf
- Zahret El-Ola as Bou-Azza
- Rushdy Abaza as Colonel Bigeard
- Kariman as Hassiba
- Farida Fahmy as Simone
- Hussein Riad as Judge Habib
- Mahmoud El-Meliguy as Jacques Vergès
- Fakher Fakher as Mustafa Bouhired
- Adly Kasseb as Leader of the Algerian Resistance
- Suleiman El-Gindi as Hadi Bouhired
- Nadia Al-Gindi as Silent actress

== Themes ==
While the 1966 film The Battle of Algiers, released eight years after Chahine's film, has received criticism for portraying a gendered iconography and misrepresentation of Algerian "mujahidat" (female freedom fighter), Jamila, the Algerian is regarded as the first and only film to focus solely on the role of the women only mentioned in other multimedia projects. In fact, Djamila Bouhired is only one of three women briefly shown in The Battle of Algiers. Chahine's film paints the Algerian struggle against French occupation through one of many lenses of its gendered narrative, focusing a large portion of the film around the rape and torture of Djamila Bouhired.

== Reception ==
=== Support from Egyptian Government ===
The film was released during Egypt's pan-Arab Nasserist era, when the culmination of pan-Arab sentiment allowed filmmakers like Chahine to take on large-scale production of projects that would positively portray revolutionary Arab leaders like Nasser. With the government's signing of the nonalignment pact of 1955, the Egyptian nationalization of the Suez Canal in 1956, and the Algerian revolution, the context allowed Chahine to contribute to the cultivation of the indigenous Third Worldist, anti-colonial rhetoric displayed in the film.

=== Banning of the film in Algeria ===
Despite the fact that the film was seminal to gathering support from other Arab countries against the French, the film was banned in Algeria both under French occupation and post-independence. Some believe this was due to Djamila Bouhired's marriage to French lawyer Jacques Vergès, but others believe this was a tactic on the part of the Algerian government to further silence both the heroic role of women in the revolution and the highlighting of rape and torture in their narratives.

== See also ==
- Salah Zulfikar filmography
- List of Egyptian films of the 1950s
