= Suad Nasr =

Egyptian actress

- سُعاد نصر
- Born: سعاد نصر عبدالعزيز; Suad Nasr Abdulziz; 26 December 1953; Shubra, Cairo, Egypt
- Died: 5 January 2007 (aged 53); Cairo, Egypt
- Other name: Mama Maisa
- Occupations: Actress, Comedian
- Years active: 1971–2005
- Works: Filmography, TV Series, Theatre
- Spouses: Ahmed Abdul Wareth; Mohamed Abdul Monim
- Children: 2
- Awards: 2006, The National Egyptian Film Festival Best Actor in a Supporting Role Award for her performance in the film Life is the maximum of delight; 2020, An honouring, appreciation Award from Artist Mohamed Sobhi in his "50 years of Art Festival"

Suad Nasr Abd El Aziz (Arabic: سعاد نصر عبد العزيز; 26 December 1953 – 5 January 2007) was an Egyptian theatre, television, and film actress. She was born in Shubra, Cairo, Egypt. Her fame grew due to her role as the character "Maisa", whom she played in the TV series Wanees's Diary, during its first five parts, which began in 1994.

== Life ==
=== Early life ===
She was born on December 26, 1953, in Shubra, Cairo, and was aspiring and striving to be a journalist. However, she ended up joining the Higher Institute for Dramatic Arts, from which she graduated in 1975.

=== Career beginnings ===
She performed a tragic scene in the story of "Yaseen and Bahia" during her graduation project, which announced her birth as an artist who could professionally perform.

Her first appearance was in the play "The Dabbash Family" by the first one to help her in that world, according to what she said in a press interview, Samir Al-Asfouri, and her first recorded appearance was in 1971 when she participated during her studies in the play "Yassin Weldi", which was directed by her discoverer to comedy Karam Mutawa. He found in her a comedian, contrary to what she thought, that she is only suitable for tragedy. At the beginning of her career, she participated in several works, including the movie "An Apartment in Wist El-Balad", the TV series "Deserted Beach", and the play "The Lesson Is Over, Stupid" in 1975, so her roles varied across cinema, television and theater, and she had a mark in every way.

== Career ==
In 1982, she made her real breakthrough through her participation in the movie "The Fatal Jealousy" and "An Egyptian Story". She then rolled her cinematic roles in which the most prominent was her role in the movie "Here Cairo", which placed her in the ranks of comedy stars in Egypt through her simple performance of the Upper-Egyptian woman character who goes with her husband to visit Cairo, whose character was played by artist Mohamed Sobhi. She excelled in theatre after participating in the play The Barbaric in 1985, and the play The Family of Wanees in 1997. She also participated with him in two of the most successful Arab comedy TV series, namely "Rehlat Al Million" in 1984, and "Wanees's Diaries" with its first five parts that started in 1994, and the role of the character "Maysa", whom she played achieved an unrivaled public success that she mentioned in some press interviews that fans call her "Mama Maysa". She worked again with director Youssef Chahine in the movie Alexandria-New York in 2004, after which she participated in her last work, "Life is the maximum of delight" in 2005.

== Death ==
She underwent a liposuction in a Cairo hospital, and went into a coma that lasted for a year after she was given an anesthetic dose in preparation as a liposuction procedure. Her last words before her death were: "My Lord, if you send my soul into me, then send it pure, and if I die, then make me die with the righteous ones." In a statement attributed to her second husband, the petroleum engineer Muhammad Abdel Moneim, as he stated, according to some newspapers, that she recovered from her coma for about five minutes, and she requested him to be buried quickly if she died, and that her family would stay for about an hour at her grave to pray for her. Her daughter, Fayrouz, is said to be a witness to another incident, which is her vision, which is said that she had predicted her death from. Then she died on January 5, 2007, leaving behind a beautiful legacy of work and great love in the hearts of those who loved her.

The ordeal of her illness was accompanied by many accusations from the press to the anesthesiologist responsible for the operation, and he was sentenced to three years imprisonment, and on bail of E£5,000 to stop the sentence, but the charge was eventually dropped.

== Filmography ==
- Emraah Bela Qalb 1978
- Al Gheerah Al Katelah 1982
- Khalil Baad El Taadeel 1987
- Haddoutah Masreyyah 1982
- Al Bedayah 1986
- Shakka Fi West Al Balad 1975
- Gawaz Be Karar Gomhoory 2001
- Hona Al Qahera 1985
- Ahlam Aadeyya 2005
- Aly Spicy 2005
- Khareef Aadm 2002
- Alexandria-New York 2004
- Life is the maximum of delight 2005

== Theatre ==
- Goz w'Loz
- Al-Hamagy
- Yawmeyat wanis
- Teksab ya Kheisha

== Television ==
- Rihlat Al Melyoun
- Yawmiat Wanis (the first 5 parts)
