= Madiha Salem =

Egyptian actress (1944–2015)

- مديحة سالم
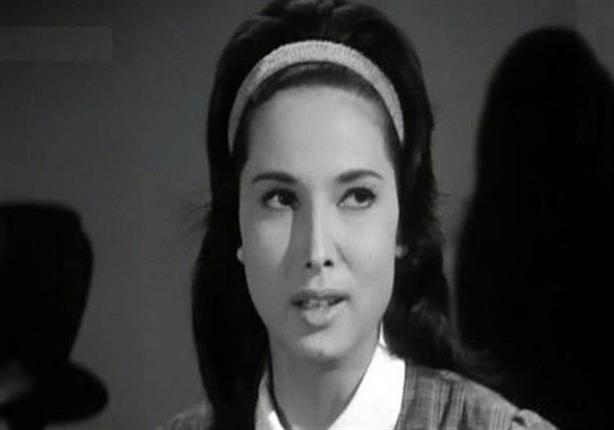
- Madiha Salem in 1968
- Born: October 2, 1944
- Died: November 19, 2015 (aged 71)
- Occupation: Actress

Madiha Salem (Arabic: مديحة سالم; 2 October 1944 – 19 November 2015) was an Egyptian actress who appeared in 29 films, and 13 radio and TV serials. She is known for playing the "dreamy teenager" in Egyptian classics from the 1960s.

== early life ==
Salem was born in the Zamalek neighborhood of Cairo. In high school she studied at the Zamalek School for Girls. Her father died shortly after she finished high school, forcing her to abandon further studies and to look for work.

== Career ==
Known as the "teenager of the cinema" and the "innocent cat of the screen," she played many supporting roles during the golden era of Egyptian cinema of the 60s and 70s, mainly in the role of the dreamy teenager. She acted on TV and worked as a voice actress in radio serials as well. She is said to have drawn attention for her "light-hearted and unassuming" performances of her roles on the Egyptian screen. She quit acting in the early 80s, preferring to spend her time with her husband and family.

Salem briefly reappeared on the TV screen in the religious drama "The Judiciary of Islam" (القضاء في الإسلام), appearing in 1998 and 2001–2002, but did not subsequently appear in any other acting role.

She died on November 19 in El Safa Hospital due to respiratory problems. Her funeral took place the next day at the Hamidiyya-Shadhiliyya Mosque in the Mohandessin neighborhood in Giza and she was buried in a Cairo cemetery.

== Filmography ==
=== Film ===
- بلا دموع (Without Tears) (1961)
- Ah men Hawwa (1962)

- Mother of the Bride (1963)
- The way of the devil (1963)
- Dearer than My Life (1965)
- Dawn of a New Day (1965)
- Three Thieves (1966)
- The Nile and the Life (1968)
- Those People of the Nile (1972)
- Love and pride (1972)
- Strange visitor (1975)
- The Night (1978)
- Trees Die Standing (1980)
- Who Killed This Love (1980)
- الرجل والحصان (The Man and the Horse) (1982)

=== Television ===
- إلا دمعة الحزن (But a Tear of Sorrow - series) (1979)
- Dalia El Masriya (1982)
