= Star Inspector =

- Directed by: Mark Kovalyov; Vladimir Polin
- Written by: Vladislav Smirnov; Mark Kovalyov; Boris Travkin
- Starring: Vladimir Ivashov; Yury Gusev
- Cinematography: Vladimir Fastenko
- Edited by: L. Knyazeva
- Music by: Boris Rychkov
- Production company: Mosfilm
- Release date: October 1980 (Soviet Union)
- Running time: 81 minutes
- Country: Soviet Union
- Language: Russian

Star Inspector (Russian: Звёздный инспектор, romanized: Zvyozdniy inspektor) is a 1980 Soviet science fiction film directed by Mark Kovalyov and Vladimir Polin.

== Plot ==
Unknown combat space ship, later identified as "Antares", the property of company "Meinthaus", commits an unmotivated attack on the base of the International Space Inspectorate and destroys it. The investigation of this event is entrusted to Sergei Lazarev, who, along with his comrades on the Vaigach patrol ship, arrives at the scene of the incident.

Star inspectors find that the causes of what happened should be sought in the mysterious disappearance a few years ago of a group of scientists led by the talented biologist Augusto Michelli.

On the instructions of the "Meinthaus" company, in the atmosphere of the deepest secrecy, work was completed on the working model of the artificial brain, which got out of control and enslaved its creators. Artificial intelligence is trying to get hold of the brains of the crew of the patrol ship, but they have the "Orlov effect", which can protect from kappa radiation for three hours ...

== Cast ==
- Vladimir Ivashov — Sergey Lazarev
- Yury Gusev — Gleb Sklyarevsky
- Timofei Spivak — Karel Zdeněk
- Valentina Titova — Marjorie Hume
- Emmanuil Vitorgan — Douglas Kober
- Vilnis Bekeris — Steve Wilkins
- Boris Kazin — commentator
- Vyacheslav Gostinsky — lawyer
- Khazral Shumakhov — Luis Revera
- Alexander Rogovin — Chairman of the International Association
- Leonid Kmit — reporter
- Valery Lysenkov — reporter
- Valentin Kulik — reporter
- Nikolay Brilling — representative of the firm "Meinthouse"
- Konstantin Zakharov — Assistant to the Chairman
