= Mouths and Rabbits =

- أفواه وأرانب
- Directed by: Henry Barakat
- Written by: Samir Abdelazim
- Starring: Faten Hamama; Mahmoud Yassin; Farid Shawqi; Ali El Sherif; Ragaa Hussein; Hassan Mustafa; Magda El-Khatib; Abu Bakr Ezzat
- Cinematography: Wahid Farid
- Edited by: Rashida Abdel Salam
- Music by: Gamal Salama
- Production company: United Film Company
- Release date: 1977
- Country: Egypt
- Language: Arabic

Mouths and Rabbits (Arabic: أفواه وأرانب, transliterated as Afwah wa araneb) is an Egyptian film released in 1977, produced by the United Film Company, and directed by Henry Barakat.

== Synopsis ==
The film explores issues of poverty and unplanned families. Nima (Faten Hamama lives with her older sister and the latter's husband Abdulmajid, who have nine children between them. Abdulmajid is an alcoholic railroad worker who neglects his family. The couple decides to marry Nima off to a teacher named Al-Batawi to financially stabilize the household, prompting Nima to flee to Mansoura while Al-Batawi is married with papers Abdulmajid forges. In Mansoura, Nima finds work on the farm of a gentleman named Mahmoud Bey, who falls in love with her after separating from his fiancée. On her return to inform her sister, Nima brings Mahmoud Bey, who encounters a livid Al-Batawi and fights back ending in the latter's stabbing. Devastated, Abdulmajid acknowledges his error and allows Nima to marry Mahmoud, who takes care of the family as Al-Batawi had promised to do.

== Cast ==
- Faten Hamama
- Mahmoud Yassin
- Farid Shawqi
- Ali El Sherif
- Ragaa Hussein
- Hassan Mustafa
- Magda El-Khatib
- Inas El-Degheidy
- Widad Hamdi
- Abu Bakr Ezzat
- Mohsen Mohieddin
- Ahmed Salama
- Salah Nazmi
