= Negma Ibrahim =

Egyptian actress (1914–1976)

- نجمة إبراهيم
- Born: February 25, 1914 (age 112); Cairo, Egypt
- Died: June 4, 1976 (aged 62); Cairo, Egypt
- Occupation: Actor

Negma Ibrahim (February 25, 1914 – June 4, 1976) was an Egyptian actress who acted in over 40 movies. She is best known for her work acting as evil roles in the classical era of Egyptian cinema.

She was born to a Jewish family in Cairo. She began her career as a singer in 1921. She converted from Judaism to Islam in 1932.

Her sister Serena was also an actress.

== Filmography ==
- Aydah (1942)
- The Angel of Mercy (1946)
- The Adventures of Antar and Abla (1948)
- The Two Orphans (1949)
- Chair of Confession (1949)
- A Night of Love (1951)
- Raya and Sakina (1953)
- Warm Nights (1961)
- Three Thieves (1966)
