= Forever Yours (1959 film) =

1958 film

- Directed by: Youssef Chahine
- Starring: Mahmoud el-Meliguy
- Release date: 19 September 1959
- Running time: 94 minutes
- Country: Egypt
- Language: Arabic

Forever Yours (Arabic: حب إلى الأبد, translit. Hubb lel-abad) is a 1959 Egyptian drama film directed by Youssef Chahine. It was entered into the 1st Moscow International Film Festival.

== Cast ==
- Mahmoud el-Meliguy
- Nadia Lutfi
- Ahmed Ramzy
