= Good Morning, My Dear Wife =

1969 Egyptian film

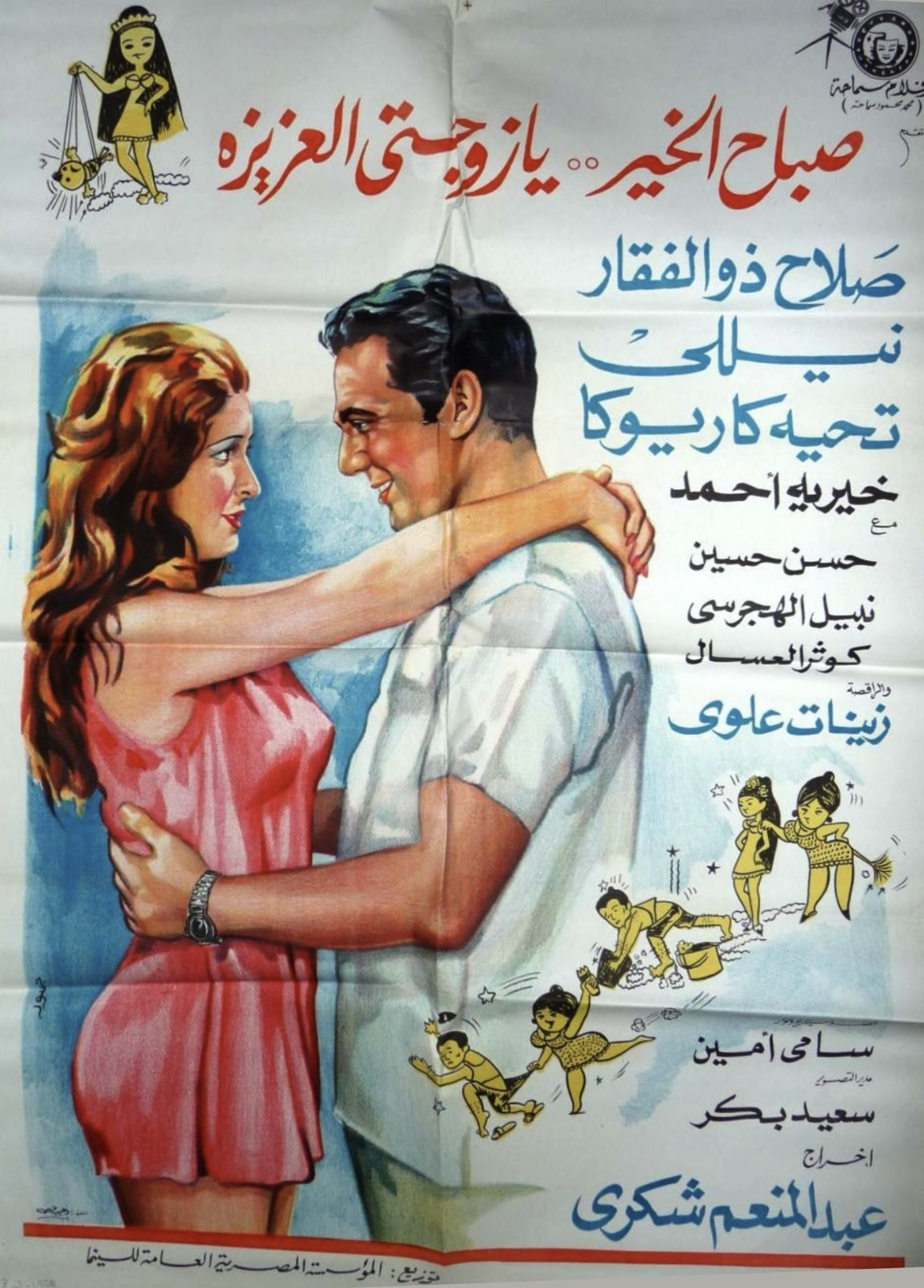
- Theatrical release poster
- Arabic: صباح الخير يا زوجتي العزيزة
- Directed by: Abdel Moneim Shokry
- Written by: Samy Amin
- Starring: Salah Zulfikar; Nelly
- Cinematography: Said Bakr
- Edited by: Kamal Abu El Ela
- Music by: Ahmed Abu Zeid
- Production company: Samaha Films
- Distributed by: General Egyptian Corporation for Cinema and Television
- Release date: 17 March 1969 (Egypt)
- Running time: 95 minutes
- Country: Egypt
- Language: Egyptian Arabic

Good Morning, My Dear Wife (Arabic: صباح الخير يا زوجتي العزيزة, translit: Sabah El Kheir ya Zawgaty El Aziza) is a 1969 Egyptian film starring Salah Zulfikar and Nelly. It is written by Samy Amin and directed by Abdel Moneim Shokry.

== Synopsis ==
The two spouses, Hassan and Samia, who are happily married, and their lives are disturbed by some of Samia's mother's harassment, who dislikes Hassan and wants her daughter to leave him and marry her cousin who loved her from childhood. Then they have their first child and start trying to face problems in dealing with nannies and trying to hold on their jobs.

== Primary cast ==
- Salah Zulfikar as Hassan
- Nelly as Samia
- Taheyya Kariokka as Samia’s mother
- Nabil El-Hagrasy as Hanafy
- Fathia Chahine as School principal
- Zeinat Olwi as The dancer
- Fahmy Aman as Ragab
- Kawthar Al-Asal as Karima
- Khairiya Ahmed as Mahasen
- Hussein Ismail
- Laila Yousry
- Hassan Hussein
- Wahid Saif

== See also ==
- Egyptian cinema
- List of Egyptian films of 1969
