= Dawn of a New Day (film) =

1965 Egyptian film

- Arabic: فجر يوم جديد
- Directed by: Youssef Chahine
- Written by: Samir Nasri; Abd al-Rahman Sharqawii
- Produced by: Mary Queeny
- Starring: Sanaa Gamil
- Cinematography: Abdelaziz Fahmy
- Edited by: Rachida Abdesalam
- Music by: Angelo Francesco Lavagnino
- Release date: 10 February 1965 (Egypt)
- Running time: 128 minutes
- Country: Egypt
- Language: Egyptian Arabic

Dawn of a New Day (Arabic: فجر يوم جديد, Fagr Yom gedid) is a 1965 Egyptian film written by Samir Nasri and Abd al-Rahman Sharqawi, and directed by Youssef Chahine. It stars Sanaa Gamil.

The plot follows a sad love story through which light is shed on the anxiety that the bourgeois class suffered from after the 1952 Egyptian revolution, as that class failed to deal with and absorb the new changes in society. Director Chahine expressed the anxiety of the post-revolution bourgeoisie through a woman searching for herself hesitantly within a new world that is unfamiliar to her.

== Plot ==
Nayla, 40, is the wife of an effete rich drunken bourgeois, who married her as a glamour teen and turned her world to misery. In her desperate search for a new dawn of life and meaningful feelings, she tries ineffectually to connect with the world she used to know. She meets a young man, Tariq, and is attracted to his simplicity, even though he is from a completely different social standard. She does not choose any man from her class, especially Abu Al-Ela, who is trying to get close to her. when she gets closer to Tariq and his world, thoughts about her past overwhelm her, and an intense discussion takes place between them, during which it becomes clear that each of them is unable to communicate with the other, so she decides at the end to stay away from him.

== Cast ==
- Sanaa Gamil as Nayla
- Saif Abdelrahman as Tariq
- Hamdy Gheith as Hussein Abu El-Ela
- Soher El Bably as Huda
- Madiha Salem as Samira
- Youssef Chahine as Hamada
- Hassan El Baroudy as Hassan
- Abdel Khaleq Saleh as Abddallah
- Badr Noufal
- Mohamed Yehia
- Laila Yousry
- Fattouh Nashaty

== See also ==
- Egyptian cinema
- Filmography of Youssef Chahine
- List of Egyptian films of the 1960s
