= Three Thieves (1966 film) =

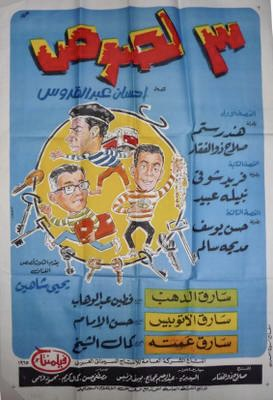
- Film poster
- ثلاث لصوص
- Directed by: Hassan El Imam; Kamal El Sheikh; Fatin Abdel Wahab
- Written by: Ihsan Abdel Quddous
- Produced by: Salah Zulfikar
- Starring: Salah Zulfikar; Yehia Chahine; Farid Shawqi
- Cinematography: Mahmoud Fahmy; Mustafa Hassan; Kamal Karim
- Edited by: Rachida Abdel Salam
- Production companies: Salah Zulfikar Films Company; Filmentaj
- Distributed by: Filmentaj
- Release date: 1966
- Country: Egypt
- Language: Egyptian Arabic

Three Thieves also known as 3 Robbers (Egyptian Arabic: ثلاثة لصوص translit: Thalathat lousous french:Trois voleurs) is a 1966 Egyptian film. It tells 3 separate stories about three thieves. The film is written by Ihsan Abdel Quddous and produced by Salah Zulfikar. Yehia Chahine played the role of the judge.

== First story: The gold thief ==
=== Plot ===
The events revolve around Mohsen, an employee who is transferred to Cairo. He searches for an apartment to live in. He finds an apartment, but is surprised by its high price. He requires that he buy meat from the owner of the apartment who owns a butcher's shop. He gets to know the butcher's wife and goes to her apartment and gives him some of her gold. The wife is against someone else who comes to buy another apartment, the wife refuses to meet Mohsen and he decides to steal the wife's gold.

=== Cast ===
- Salah Zulfikar: (Mohsen)
- Hind Rostom: (Narges - Madbouly's wife)
- Saeed Abu Bakr: (Musad Al-Bawab)
- Mohamed Reda: (Madbouly the butcher)
- Youssef Fakhr Eddine: (the new resident)

=== Staff ===
- Directed by: Fatin Abdel Wahab
- Screenplay and dialogue: Abdel Rehim Haggag
- Cinematography: Mahmoud Fahmy
- Editing: Rashida Abdel Salam

== Second story: The bus thief ==
=== Plot ===
The events revolve around "Al-Usta Fahmy", a driver who delivers goods. His wife feels sick, so he takes her to the doctor, who tells him that she has a rheumatic heart disease. His wife feels tired during his work, so he buys medicine and takes the bus to go to his wife. He asks the driver to speed up because of his wife's fatigue and her need for treatment, but he tells him If he wants to speed up, he must take a taxi, then the driver leaves the bus and goes to drink tea, so Fahmy asks him to go back to the bus, but the driver tells him that he is taking a break.

=== Cast ===
- Farid Shawqi: (Fahmy)
- Nabila Ebeid: (Buthaina - Fahmy's wife)
- Abdel Moneim Ibrahim: (Al Kamsari)
- Adly Kasseb: (bus driver)
- Adel Emam: (riding the bus)
- Suheir Al-Baroni: (dancer - riding the bus)
- Mohamed Shawky: (shop - passenger on the bus)
- Dr. Shadid: (Awad - a passenger on the bus)

=== staff ===
- Directed by: Hassan El Imam
- Screenplay and dialogue: El Sayed Badir - Youssef Francis
- Photography: Mustafa Hassan
- Editing: Rachida Abdel Salam

== Third story: His aunt’s thief ==
=== plot ===
The events revolve around "Moneim", a young man who lives with his aunt Tawheeda. He proposes to a girl, but he cannot find an apartment to marry with. His aunt Tawheeda refuses to marry Nahid in her apartment. He proposes to Nahid another person and owns an apartment. Monem thinks of marrying Nahid in the apartment after his aunt's death. Nahid's mother tells him that she will betroth her daughter to the other person if he does not find an apartment or if his aunt does not die. Monem disguises himself as a ghost and frightens his aunt, so she loses consciousness and thinks that she is dead and runs away. His aunt comes to him and tells him that she agreed. On his marriage to Nahid, she gives him the key to the apartment and tells him that she gave him her money and gives him the key to the safe. When he goes to take the money, his aunt reports him to the police and he is arrested.

=== Cast ===
- Hassan Youssef: (Moneim)
- Madiha Salem: (Nahed - Monem's fiancée)
- Negma Ibrahim: (Tawheed - Monem's aunt)
- Mimi Chakib: (Nahed's mother)
- Ihsan Sharif: (Farida - Monem's aunt)
- Abu Bakr Ezzat: (Mohamed Al-Arian)

=== staff ===
- Directed by: Kamal El Sheikh
- Screenplay and dialogue: Abdel Rehim Haggag
- Photography: Kamal Karim
- Editing: Galal Mustafa
