= The Splendor of Love =

1968 film by Mahmoud Zulfikar

- Egyptian Arabic: روعة الحب
- Directed by: Mahmoud Zulfikar
- Written by: Hala El-Hefnawi
- Produced by: Farouk Naguib
- Starring: Rushdy Abaza; Naglaa Fathi; Yehia Chahine
- Cinematography: Abdel Halim Nasr
- Edited by: Hussein Afifi
- Music by: Fouad Al-Zahery
- Production company: Ramses Naguib
- Distributed by: Cairo Distribution company (domestic); Arab Cinema Corporation (worldwide)
- Release date: 1 July 1968
- Country: Egypt
- Language: Egyptian Arabic

The Splendor of Love (aliases: The Beauty of Love, Egyptian Arabic: روعة الحب, translit. Rawa'et El Hubb) is a 1968 Egyptian film directed by Mahmoud Zulfikar.

== Synopsis ==
The young girl Hayam marries the author Mahmoud Salem, who has always read in his eyes the ideas and opinions contained in his books. Then, Hayam returns and runs away from the house while he is chasing her. During the escape, an attractive young man, Ahmed appears to her, whom the Maadi girls love. Almost settled on the airport grounds and at the end, everyone dies.

== Crew ==
- Director: Mahmoud Zulfikar
- Writer: Hala El Hefnawy
- Screenwriter: Mohamed Abu Houssef
- Producer: Farouk Naguib
- Studio: Ramses Naguib
- Distribution:
  - Cairo Distribution company (domestic)
  - Arab Cinema Corporation (worldwide)

== Cast ==
=== Primary cast ===
- Rushdy Abaza as Ahmed
- Naglaa Fathi as Hayam
- Yehia Chahine as Mahmoud Salem
- Abdul Moneim Ibrahim as Hassan
- Madiha Hamdi as Huda
- Karima Sharif as Fawzia

=== Guest stars ===
- Mahmoud El-Meliguy
- Emad Hamdy
- Nadia Seif El-Nasr

=== Supporting cast ===
- Alia Abdel Moneim
- Baher El-Sayed
- Salwa my intelligence
- Essam Al-Halabi
- Mervat Ezzo
- Nayel Abdel-Maksoud
- Gamila Attia
- Fahmy Rashad
- Aida Waheed
