= The Choice (1970 film) =

- Directed by: Youssef Chahine
- Written by: Youssef Chahine
- Starring: Soad Hosny; Ezzat El Alaili; Mahmoud El-Meliguy
- Edited by: Rashida Abdel Salam
- Music by: Ali Ismael
- Release date: 15 March 1971 (Egypt)
- Country: Egypt
- Language: Arabic

The Choice (also known as Al-ikhtiyar) is a 1970 Egyptian drama and mystery film directed by Youssef Chahine.The film stars Soad Hosny, Ezzat El Alaili and Mahmoud El-Meliguy in the lead roles.

== Cast ==
- Soad Hosny
- Ezzat El Alaili
- Mahmoud El-Meliguy
- Seif El Dine
- Seif Eddine Shawkat
