= Vladimir Ivashov =

Soviet and Russian actor

- Владимир Ивашов
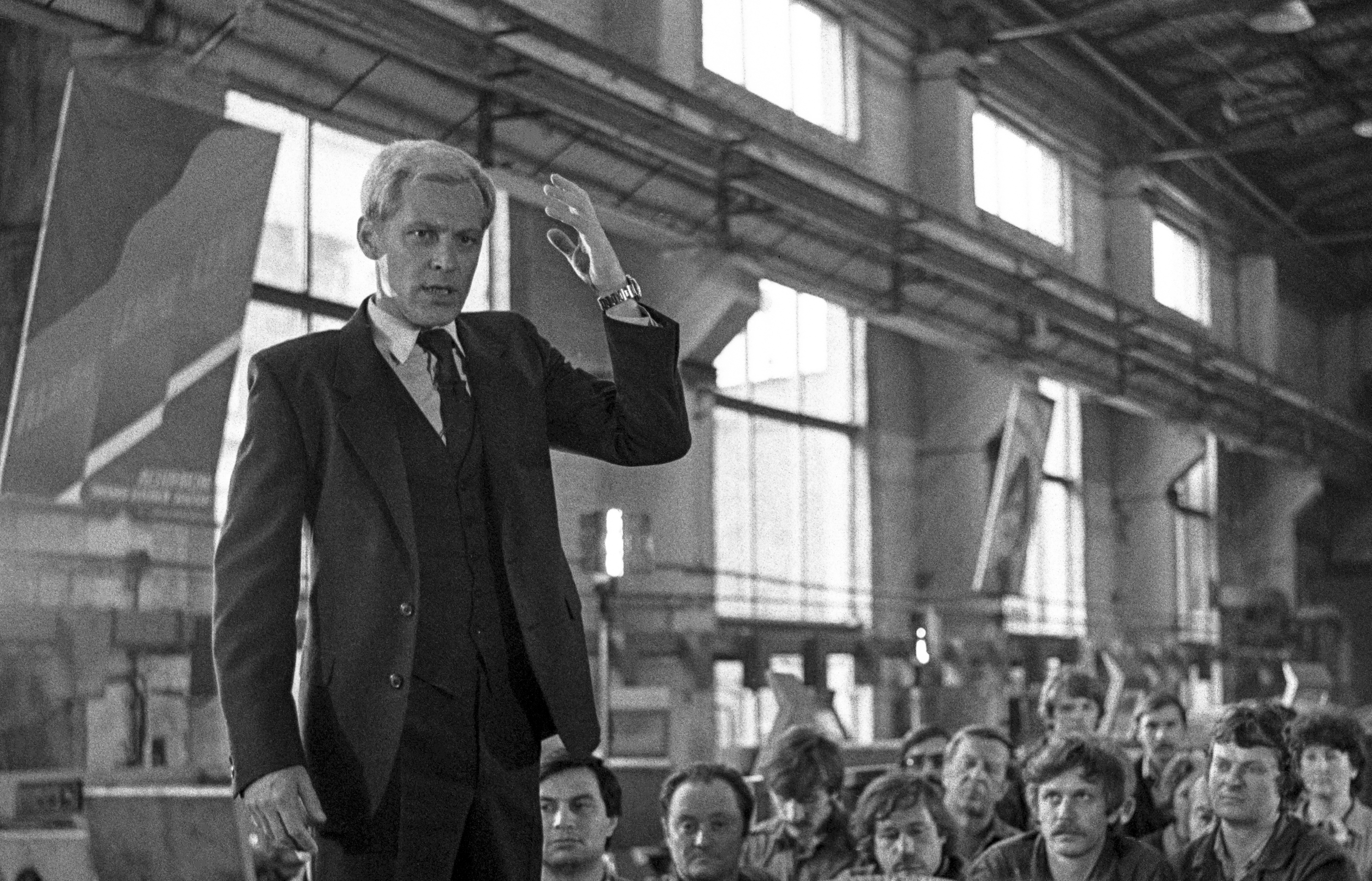
- Ivashov in 1987
- Born: 28 August 1939; Moscow, USSR
- Died: 23 March 1995 (aged 55); Moscow, Russia
- Occupation: Actor
- Years active: 1957–1993
- Spouse(s): Svetlana Svetlichnaya (m. 1959)

Vladimir Sergeyevich Ivashov (Russian: Влади́мир Серге́евич Ивашо́в; 28 August 1939 — 23 March 1995) was a Soviet and Russian actor.

== Biography ==
He had a film career that spanned over 30 years. He is best known for his BAFTA–nominated role as Pvt. Alyosha Skvortsov in Ballad of a Soldier which he starred in with Zhanna Prokhorenko in 1959. The film was awarded the Moscow International Film Festival award in 1960. It also won the Lenin Award. The film was kept in the film hall of The Kremlin to be shown to foreign guests.

Ivashov died in Moscow, Russia, on 23 March 1995 of acute gastric ulcer at the age of 55. Asteroid 12978 Ivashov, discovered by Lyudmila Zhuravleva in 1978, was named in his memory.

== Personal life ==
He married actress Svetlana Svetlichnaya and had two sons, Oleg and Alexey.

== Selected filmography ==
- Ballad of a Soldier (1959) as Alyosha Skvortsov
- Seven Nannies (1962) as Viktor
- Hero of Our Time (1965) as Grigory Pechorin
- The Hockey Players (1965) as Morozov
- Torrents of Steel (1967) as Alexey Prikhodko
- The Nile and the Life (1968) as Nikolai
- The New Adventures of the Elusive Avengers (1968) as lieutenant Perov, Kudasov's adjutant
- The Crown of the Russian Empire, or Once Again the Elusive Avengers (1971) as former lieutenant Perov
- Those People of the Nile (1972) as Nikolai
- Hopelessly Lost (1973) as Colonel Sherborne
- Remember Your Name (1974) as major
- Diamonds for the Dictatorship of the Proletariat (1975) as Isayev
- Jarosław Dąbrowski (1976) as Andrey Afanasevich Potebnya
- Father Sergius (1978) as episode
- Inquest of Pilot Pirx (1979) as Harry Brown
- Star Inspector (1980) as Sergey Lazarev
- Day of Wrath (1985) as Cast

== Awards and nominations ==
Year	Association	Category	Work	Result	Ref.
1962	BAFTA Awards	Best Foreign Actor	Ballad of a Soldier	Nominated	
