= The Adventures of Antar and Abla =

1948 film

- Directed by: Salah Abu Seif
- Written by: Salah Abu Seif; Naguib Mahfouz; A. A. Salam
- Produced by: Hassan Mustafa
- Starring: Kouka
- Release date: 1948
- Running time: 105 minutes
- Country: Egypt
- Language: Arabic

The Adventures of Antar and Abla (Arabic: مغامرات عنتر وعبلة, translit. Mughamarat Antar wa Abla) is a 1948 Egyptian film directed by Salah Abu Seif. It was entered into the 1949 Cannes Film Festival.

== Cast ==
- Seraj Munir as Antarah ibn Shaddad
- Kouka as Abla
- Zaki Toleimat
- Negma Ibrahim
- Stephan Rosti
- Farid Shawqi
