= Huda Sultan =

Egyptian actress and singer (1925–2006)

Huda Sultan هـدى سلطان
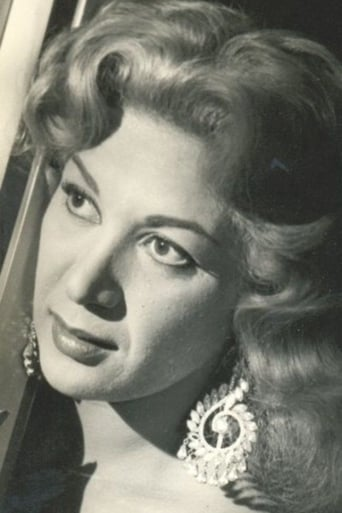
- Sultan in 1952

Background information
- Born: Bahiga Abdel'al بهيجة عبد العال; 15 August 1925; Tanta, Gharbia, Kingdom of Egypt
- Died: 5 June 2006 (aged 80) 6th of October, Giza, Egypt
- Genre: Egyptian music
- Occupations: Actress; singer
- Spouses: Mohamed Naguib (divorced); name unknown (divorced); Fowad Al-Atrash (divorced); Farid Shawqi (divorced); Hassan Abdel Salam

Huda Sultan or Hoda Sultan (Arabic: هـدى سلطان; born Bahiga Abdel'al [بهيجه عبد العال]; 15 August 1925 – 5 June 2006), was an Egyptian actress and singer. She was also one of the most awarded actress for her roles, especially in musicals in the black and white films where she played secondary and leading roles. Sultan performed in hundreds of films in Egyptian cinema in a 56-year career.

== Early life ==
Huda Sultan was born on 15 August 1925 in the rural Egyptian city of Tanta to a rural conservative family. She was the third of five siblings; one of her brothers was the renowned artist Mohamed Fawzi. She was born as Bahiga Abd El-Aal, but later adopted her new acting name, Huda Sultan, after many suggestions from prominent Egyptian Cinema producers that her birth name was too rural.

== Career ==
In 1950 she starred in her first film "Set El Hosn" (ست الحسن, "The lady of beauty"); soon after, she married the Egyptian actor Farid Shawqi and the couple had formed a successful duo and acted together in numerous films as well with Egypt's leading actors such as: Salah Zulfikar, Rushdy Abaza and Shoukry Sarhan. Her most notable works are in the films; "El Fetewa" (الفتوة, "The Bully"), Ezz El-Dine Zulficar’s "Emra’a Fel Tareeq" (إمرأة في الطريق, "A Woman in the Road") with Shoukry Sarhan and Rushdy Abaza, "Nessa Muharramat" (نساء محرمات, "Forbidden Women") with Salah Zulfikar.

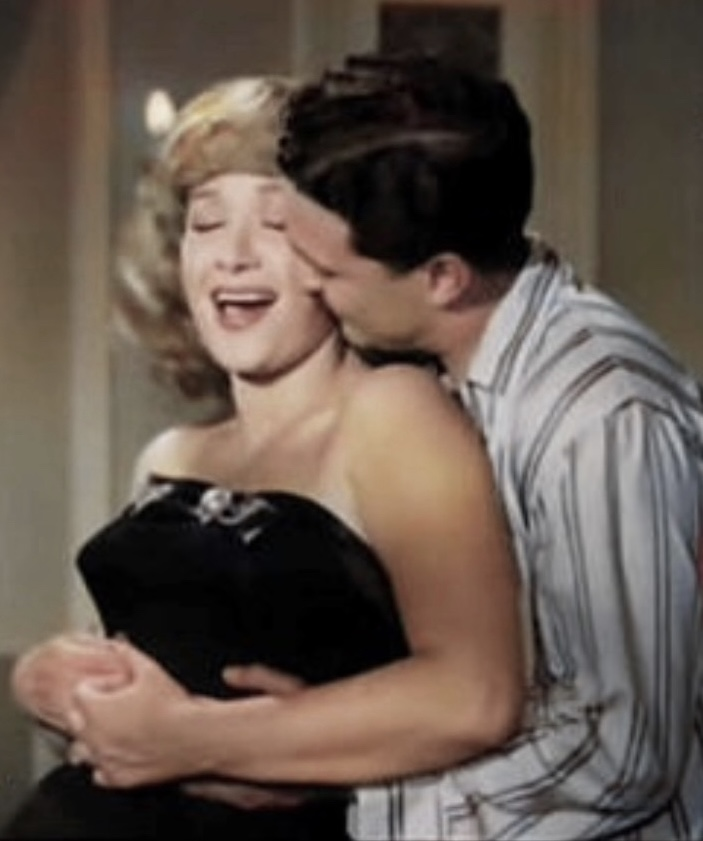
Huda Sultan and Salah Zulfikar in a romantic scene from the 1959 film Forbidden Women.

In 1960, she starred "Serr Imra'a" (سر امرأة, “Woman's Secret”) with Salah Zulfikar and Emad Hamdy. In 1968, she appeared in “Thalath Nesaa” (ثلاث نساء, “Three Women”) with Salah Zulfikar, Shoukry Sarhan and Ahmed Ramzy. "Shaye' Fe Sadry" (شئ في صدري, "Something in My Heart") with Rushdy Abaza. Also Youssef Chahine's "El Ekhtyar" (الإختيار, "The Choice") with Soad Hosny. In 1976, she co-starred in "Awdat Al Ibn Aldal" (عودة الابن الضال, "The Return of the Prodigal Son") with Shoukry Sarhan, and "El Wada'a Ya Banobart" (الوداع يا بونبارت, "Adieu Bonaparte") with Salah Zulfikar, Patrice Chéreau and Michel Piccoli. In 1986, Sultan starred in "Min Fadlik Wa Ihsanik" (من فضلك وإحسانك, "Please and Your Kindness") with Salah Zulfikar and Hesham Selim.

== Personal life ==
=== Marriages ===
Sultan married five times: her first husband, Mohamed Naguib, was a prominent Egyptian government official who did not agree to his wife's celebrity status and divorced her soon after her first movie. Her second husband was an Egyptian movie producer, and her third husband was Fowad Al-Atrash (brother of singer Farid al-Atrash and Asmahan), she divorced him in order to marry leading actor Farid Shawqi. She then married director Hassan Abdel Salam.

=== Children ===
Sultan had one daughter with her first husband, Mohamed Naguib, called Maha, and two daughters with her fourth husband Shawqi, one of them, Nahed, who is a movie producer. Her granddaughter is actress Nahed El Sebai.

== Death ==
In 2006 she died of lung cancer, at the age of 81 years, after a long illness, at Dar Al Fouad on 6th of October.
