= List of Egyptian films of 1952 =

This is a list of films produced in Egypt in 1952. For an A-Z list of Egyptian films currently on Wikipedia, see Category:Egyptian films.

Title	Director	Cast	Genre	Notes
Al-Manzel Raqam 13 (House No. 13)	Kamal El Sheikh	Faten Hamama, Mahmoud El-Meliguy, Emad Hamdy	Crime	
Al-Ustazah Fatimah (Miss Fatimah)	Fatin Abdel Wahab	Kamal Al-Shennawi, Faten Hamama	Comedy	
Lahn al-Kholood (Immortal Song)	Henry Barakat	Faten Hamama, Farid al-Atrash	Romance / drama	
