= A Taste of Fear =

- Arabic: شيء من الخوف
- Directed by: Hussein Kamal
- Written by: Tharwat Abaza; Abdel Rahman el-Abnudi
- Produced by: Salah Zulfikar
- Starring: Shadia
- Cinematography: Ahmed Khorshid
- Edited by: Rachida Abdel Salam
- Music by: Baligh Hamdi
- Production company: Salah Zulfikar Films Company
- Distributed by: General Egyptian Corporation for Cinema and Television
- Release date: 1969
- Running time: 102 minutes
- Country: Egypt
- Language: Egyptian Arabic

A Taste of Fear (aliases: Something of Fear or A Bit of Fear or Something from Fear or A Touch of Fear, Arabic: شيء من الخوف, translit: Shey Min El Khouf or Shey min al-Khouf) is a 1969 Egyptian film directed by Hussein Kamal and produced by Salah Zulfikar. The film is based on a short story by the great writer Tharwat Abaza, but the greatest credit for the political projections is the result of the modifications made by Abdel Rahman El-Abnudi to the script.

The film was filmed in black and white, despite the possibility of filming in color, due to the spread of color films at this time, due to the director Hussein Kamal's exploitation of black and white shades in a skill that would not have been possible if it had been filmed in color. The film was nominated for the Moscow International Film Festival best film award. A Taste of Fear is listed in the CIFF Top 100 Egyptian films of the 20th century and Bibliotheca Alexandrina's 100 Greatest Egyptian Films.

== Plot ==
The story is set in an Egyptian village ruled by Atris (played by Mahmoud Morsi), who imposes heavy taxes on the villagers. Atris has loved Fouadah (played by Shadia) since childhood, but she defies him by opening the gate he put there to punish the villagers. Unable to kill her because of his love for her, Atris decides to marry Fouadah instead.

Fouadah's father, Hafez (played by Muhammad Tawfik), cannot disobey Atris, so he arranges a fake marriage for her.

Sheikh Ibrahim (played by Yehia Chahine) then confronts Atris about the marriage, resulting in the death of Atris's son, Mahmoud.

The final scene is Mahmoud's funeral, where Sheikh Ibrahim repeats his famous words: 'Atris's marriage to Fouadah is invalid.' The villagers repeat after him and head to Atris's house. Atris cannot resist the united force of the villagers.

== Main cast ==
- Shadia
- Mahmoud Morsi
- Yehia Chahine
- Amaal Zayed
- Mohammed Tawfik
- Salah Nazmi
- Ahmed Tawfik
- Samira Mohsen
- Mahmoud Yassin
- Poussi
- Hassan El Sobky
- Wafik Fahmy

== Production ==
The film has a lot of symbolism, as Atris symbolizes the dictator, and the villagers symbolize the people who fall under the tyranny. Fouada symbolizes Egypt, which the dictator can not be happy with.

Some critics pointed out that this film may symbolize the period of Gamal Abdel Nasser's rule, and others pointed out that it may symbolize the period of King Farouk's rule, as some said that it symbolizes any dictatorial rule, tyranny and oppression in general.

Hussein Kamal said: The enemies of success have spread the rumour that we mean President Gamal Abdel Nasser by 'Atris'.

A storm occurred and the film was ready to be shown, and Salah Zulfikar Films Company already published all posters were filling the streets. Gamal Abdel Nasser watched the film with Salah Zulfikar and watched it again with Anwar Sadat. After the second viewing, Gamal Abdel Nasser was convinced that it could not be the character of Atris and allowed the film to be shown.

== See also ==
- Egyptian cinema
- Salah Zulfikar on screen and stage
- List of Egyptian films of 1969
- List of Egyptian films of the 1960s
