= Adieu Bonaparte =

1985 film directed by Youssef Chahine

- Film poster
- Directed by: Youssef Chahine
- Written by: Youssef Chahine; Yousry Nasrallah
- Produced by: Humbert Balsan; Marianne Khoury; Jean-Pierre Mahot
- Starring: Michel Piccoli; Salah Zulfikar; Mohsen Mohieddin; Patrice Chéreau
- Cinematography: Mohsen Nasr
- Edited by: Luc Barnier
- Release date: 17 May 1985
- Running time: 115 minutes
- Countries: Egypt; France
- Languages: Egyptian Arabic; French

Adieu Bonaparte or Bonaparte in Egypt (Arabic: الوداع بونابرت, Al-Wadāʿ Yā Būnābart) is a 1985 Egyptian-French historical drama film directed by Youssef Chahine and stars Michel Piccoli, Salah Zulfikar, Mohsen Mohieddin and Patrice Chéreau. It was entered into the 1985 Cannes Film Festival. It was later selected for screening as part of the Cannes Classics section at the 2016 Cannes Film Festival.

== Cast ==
- Michel Piccoli as Cafarelli
- Salah Zulfikar as Cheikh Hassouna
- Mohsen Mohieddin as Ali
- Patrice Chéreau as Napoléon Bonaparte
- Mohsena Tewfik as La mère
- Christian Patey as Horace
- Gamil Ratib as Barthelemy
- Taheya Cariocca as La sage femme
- Huda Sultan as Nefissa
- Claude Cernay as Decoin
- Mohamad Dardiri as Sheikh Charaf
- Hassan El Adl as Cheikh Aedalah
- Tewfik El Dekn as Le Derwiche (as Tewfik El Dekken)
- Seif El Dine as Kourayem (as Seif Eddina)
- Hassan Husseiny as Le père
- Farid Mahmoud as Faltaos

== See also ==
- Youssef Chahine filmography
- Salah Zulfikar filmography
- List of Egyptian films of the 1980s
