= Zeinat Olwi =

Egyptian belly dancer

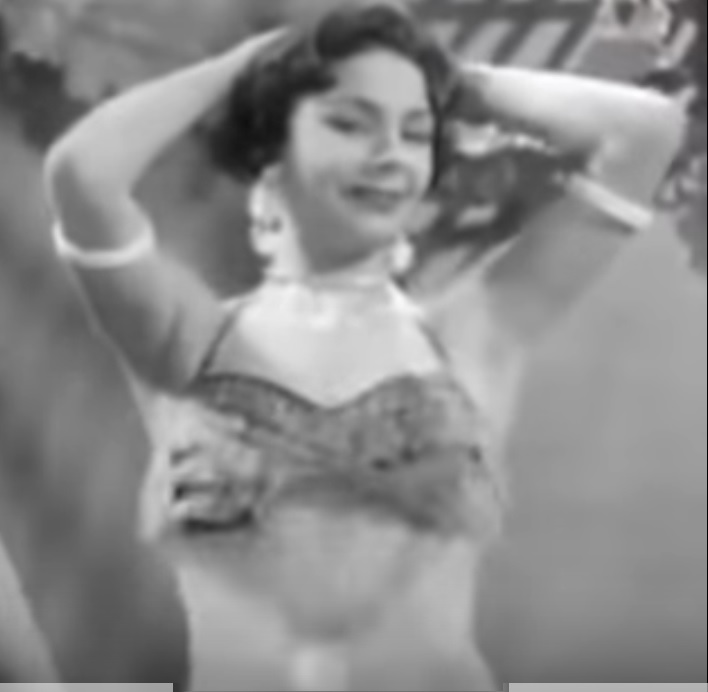
- Born: 1930; Egypt
- Died: 1988 (aged 57–58)
- Occupations: Actress and dancer
- Years active: 1955-1988

Zeinat Olwi (Arabic: زينات علوي), whose stage name was Zurah (1930–1988), was one of the leading belly dancers in Egypt in the middle of the twentieth century. She appeared in many movies from the Egyptian Golden Age of cinema. One of her most famous performances was in Henry Barakat's 1955 movie Ayyam wa layali (Days and Nights). Zeinat Olwi's origins trace back to Upper Egypt.

== Biography ==
Zeinat Elwi was born on 19 May 1930 and her origins trace back to Upper Egypt. She is considered one of the most famous dancers in the history of Egypt. She died on 16 July 1988.

== Filmography ==
- Ayyam wa layali (Days and Nights) (1955)
- El-Zawga Talattashar (Wife Number 13) (1962)
- Karamat Zawgaty (My Wife's Dignity) (1967)
- Sabah El Kheir ya Zawgaty El-Aziza (Good Morning, My Dear Wife) (1969)
