= Warm Nights (film) =

- الليالي الدافئة
- Directed by: Hassan Ramzy
- Produced by: Hassan Ramzy
- Starring: Sabah; Emad Hamdy; Poussi; Zahrat El-Ola; Kamal el-Shennawi; Negma Ibrahim; Thurayya Fakhry
- Music by: Hamada Helal
- Release date: 1961
- Country: Egypt
- Language: Arabic

Warm Nights (Arabic: الليالي الدافئة, transliterated/lit. Al-Layaly al-Dafe’a) is an Egyptian film released in 1961. It stars Sabah, Emad Hamdy, and Poussi.

== Cast ==
- Sabah (Laila)
- Emad Hamdy (Dr. Ahmed Badreddin)
- Poussi
- Zahrat El-Ola (Souad)
- Kamal el-Shennawi (Dr. Amar)
- Negma Ibrahim (Ahmed's mother)
- Thurayya Fakhry
- Ragaa Hussein
- Qadreya Kamel
- Ali Roushdy
