= The Return of the Prodigal Son (1976 film) =

1976 film

- Directed by: Youssef Chahine
- Screenplay by: Farouk Balouaa; Youssef Chahine; Salah Jahin
- Produced by: Misr International Films
- Starring: Shoukry Sarhan; Majida El Roumi; Souheir El Morshedy; Huda Sultan
- Cinematography: Abdel Aziz Fahmy
- Edited by: Rashida Abdel Salam
- Music by: Abou Zeid Hassan
- Release date: 24 September 1976
- Running time: 124 minutes
- Country: Egypt
- Language: Arabic

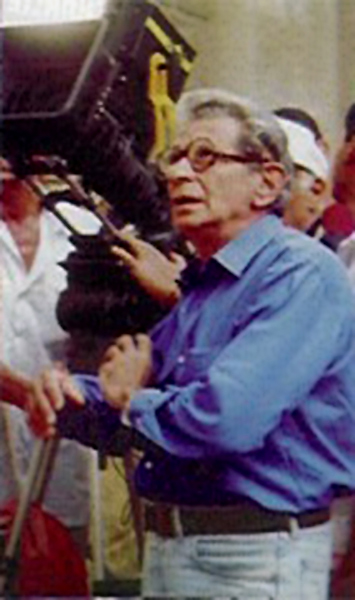
Yousef Shaheen, the director of the movie.

The Return of the Prodigal Son (Arabic: عودة الابن الضال, translit. Awdat Al Ibn Aldal) is a 1976 Egyptian drama film directed by director Youssef Chahine. The film is about a family's younger son who returns to his rural home after 12 years in Cairo. His family and town had pinned their hopes on him being successful, but when they learn that he was imprisoned, it stirs intense reactions.

== Plot ==
Ali, the son of a prominent farming family in a rural town, returns after being in away for 12 years. The hopes of his family and the town itself were pinned on Ali's success in Cairo, so they are excited about his return. The benevolent father viewed the young son as his favorite, particularly as family has had to deal with the tyranny of Ali's older brother, Tolba.

At home, he gets a warm reception from his father, mother, his would-be bride, and nephew. But excitement soon turns to disillusionment when people learn of his challenges. Despite all the hopes placed in Ali, he had problems in the big city. After a failed architectural scheme that resulted in a tower collapsing, he was jailed for three years.

When the family and town see that he will not be able to fix the failures of the family's company and the economic backbone of the town, they are disappointed. Eventually at his own wedding, Ali takes a gun and shoots down his brother and mother. Ali's brother, Tolba, manages to shoot Ali before they both succumb to their wounds. Only the nephew, Ibrahim, manages to escape the carnage and leaves to pursue a science degree in Alexandria.

== Cast ==
- Shoukry Sarhan as Tolba
- Majida El Roumi as Tafida
- Souheir El Morshdy as Fatima
- Huda Sultan as The Mother
- Mahmoud el-Meliguy as The Father
- Ahmad Mehrez as Ali
- Hesham Selim as Ibrahim

== See also ==
- Cinema of Egypt
- Lists of Egyptian films
- List of Egyptian films of the 1970s
- List of Egyptian films of 1976
