= Son of the Nile =

- Directed by: Youssef Chahine
- Written by: Youssef Chahine; Fairouz Abdel Malek
- Produced by: Mary Queeny
- Starring: Faten Hamama; Yehia Chahine; Mahmoud el-Meliguy; Shukry Sarhan
- Release date: 1951 (Egypt)
- Running time: 125 minutes
- Country: Egypt
- Language: Arabic

Son of the Nile (Arabic: ابن النيل translit. Ibn El Nil) is a 1951 Egyptian drama film directed by Youssef Chahine. It starred Yehia Chahine, Faten Hamama, Mahmoud el-Meliguy, and Shukry Sarhan and was chosen as one of the best 150 Egyptian film productions in 1996, during the Egyptian Cinema centennial. The film received an award from the New Delhi International Film Festival and was nominated for the Prix International award at the 1952 Cannes Film Festival and an award in the Venice International Film Festival.

== Plot ==
Hemaidah (shokry sarhan) is a farmer who hates country life. He hates working in fields and taking care of the animals in his farm. Though unsatisfied with her, he marries Zebeidah (Faten Hamama), a woman in the same village. He is determined to leave the village, move and live in the city. He plans for his travel and asks his brother to look after his farm and family. In Cairo, Hemaidah falls in the hands of a gang, headed by a ruthless gangster. Not wishing to risk his life, he is forced to work with the gang and help them in their crimes. He is introduced to theft and harlotry, and one day the police arrest the gang. Hemaidah spends his time in prison and returns to his village after his release, regretting that he had left it.

== Cast ==
- Shukry Sarhan as Hemaidah
- Faten Hamama as Zebeidah
- Yehia Chahine as Hemaidah's brother, Ibrahim
- Mahmoud El-Meliguy as the gang boss
- Nader Galal as Hemaidah's son

== See also ==
- The Nile and the Life
- Those People of the Nile
- Lists of Egyptian films
