= Featureless Men =

- Arabic: رجال بلا ملامح
- Directed by: Mahmoud Zulfikar
- Screenplay by: Mohamed Othman
- Produced by: Naguib Khoury
- Starring: Salah Zulfikar; Nadia Lutfi
- Cinematography: Ali Khairallah
- Edited by: Hussein Ahmed
- Production company: Naguib Khoury Films
- Distributed by: Naguib Khoury Films
- Release date: 1972
- Running time: 110 minutes
- Country: Egypt
- Language: Egyptian Arabic

Featureless Men (Arabic: رجال بلا ملامح, translit: Regal bila Malameh aliases: Faceless Men) is a 1972 Egyptian film directed by Mahmoud Zulfikar. It stars Salah Zulfikar and Nadia Lutfi. The film was shot in 1970, released in theaters in 1972. It is Mahmoud Zulfikar's final film and was released posthumously. The film was produced and distributed by Naguib Khoury Films.

== Synopsis ==
The events revolve around (Ahmed) who just finished his college in engineering. He gets to know the night girl, (Laila), and falls in love with her and tells his father that he'll marry her. But his father refuses as she's not at his social level and threatens him and events escalate.

== Main cast ==
- Salah Zulfikar as Ahmed Fouad
- Nadia Lutfi as Laila
- Mahmoud el-Meliguy as Ahmed's father, Fouad Omran
- Aida Kamel as Ferdoos
- Suhair Fakhri as Amina Kamel
- Seham Fathy as Tooha
- Badr Nofal as Hosni
- Toukhi Tawfik as Lamai
- Ezz El-Dine Islam as Shaker
