= The Sparrow (1972 film) =

Al Asfour
- Directed by: Youssef Chahine
- Screenplay by: Youssef Chahine; Lotfi Al Khouli
- Produced by: Misr International Films MH Films
- Starring: Mahmoud el-Meliguy; Salah Kabil; Salah Mansour; Ali El Sherif; Ahmed Bedir; Hamdy Ahmed; Habiba; Mohsena Tawfik
- Cinematography: Mostafa Emam
- Edited by: Rashida Abdel Salam
- Music by: Hassan Abouzeid
- Release date: 1972
- Running time: 105 minutes
- Countries: Algeria; Egypt
- Language: Arabic

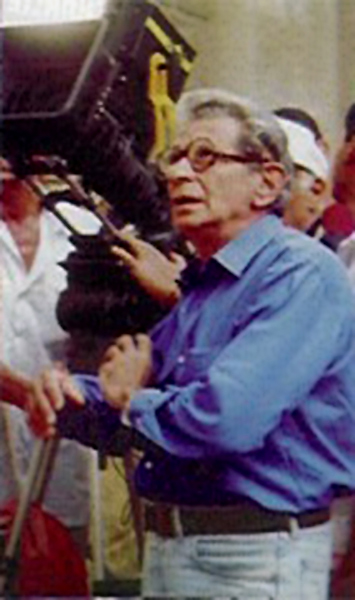
Youssef Chahine, director

Al Asfour (Arabic: العصفور, "The Sparrow") is a 1972 film directed by Youssef Chahine, with Ali Badrakhan as second director.

== Synopsis ==
June, 1967, on the eve of the Six-Day War. The Sparrow follows a young police officer stationed in a small village in Upper Egypt whose inhabitants suffer the harassment of a corrupt businessman. The police officer crosses paths with a journalist who is investigating what appears to be a scandal involving the theft of weapons and war machinery by high officials. Youssef Chahine offers us a portrait of the “sparrows”, the simple people of his country whom others use to get rich.

== Cast ==
- Salah Kabil as Yussif Fath el-Bab
- Ali El Scherif as Rawf
- Mahmoud El-Meliguy as Ryad
- Seif El Dine as Ismail
- Mariem Fakhr El Dine as Fatma
- Habiba
- Mohsena Tewfik as Bahiya
- Sid Ali Kouiret
