= Cairo Station =

1958 Egyptian film

- Film poster
- باب الحديد
- Directed by: Youssef Chahine
- Written by: Mohamed Abu Youssef; Abdel Hay Adib
- Produced by: Gabriel Talhami
- Starring: Farid Shawqi; Hind Rostom
- Cinematography: Alevise Orfanelli
- Edited by: Kamal Abul Ela
- Music by: Fouad El Zahiri
- Release date: 20 January 1958
- Running time: 77 minutes
- Country: United Arab Republic (Note: Egypt and Syria were briefly united as a single political entity during the time this film was released.)
- Language: Egyptian Arabic

Cairo Station, also called The Iron Gate (Arabic: باب الحديد Bāb al-Ḥadīd), is a 1958 Egyptian crime-drama film directed by Youssef Chahine, written by Mohamed Abu Youssef and Abdel Hay Adib, and starring Farid Shawqi and Hind Rostom. The plot follows a newspaper salesman's dangerous obsession with a pretty young refreshments seller amidst a serial killer's spree through Cairo.

Submitted for competition in the 8th Berlin International Film Festival, it was selected as the Egyptian entry for the Best Foreign Language Film at the 31st Academy Awards, but was not accepted as a nominee. Since the 1970s, the film has found renewed interest with new generations of international film lovers and has been hailed as a masterpiece in the style of neorealist cinema.

== Plot ==
A newsstand owner takes pity on Qinawi, a lame young man, and gives him a job selling newspapers in the Cairo train station. The women there all shun him because of his mild handicap, though he has little trouble walking.

Qinawi becomes obsessed with Hannuma, a beautiful cold-drink vendor. But she is engaged to Abu Siri, a husky luggage porter who is trying to organize his co-workers into a union to better their lot. Nonetheless, Qinawi proposes to her. When she rejects his fantasy of a home and children in his village, Qinawi's obsession turns to madness.

Inspired by an unsolved murder in the news, he buys a knife and plots to kill Hannuma. When the local policemen try to catch Hannuma and the other women illegally selling drinks, she asks Qinawi to take her incriminating drink bucket and hide it. He seeks to lure her to a warehouse to pick it up, but she asks a friend to get it instead.

In the darkness, Qinawi does not notice the substitution; he stabs the other woman repeatedly, then hides the body in a wooden crate supposedly holding Hannuma's trousseau. Then he gets Abu Siri to put it aboard a train for Hannuma's impending wedding. The woman is not dead, however. She is found, and the station is alerted. The men who stand to lose by Abu Siri's unionization at first try to pin the attempted murder on him, but the would-be victim identifies her real assailant. Meanwhile, unaware of her near escape from death, Hannuma goes to get her bucket. Qinawi chases her through the rail yard and catches her, holding a knife to her head to keep the crowd at bay. The newsstand owner tells Qinawi that he will be allowed to marry Hannuma and coaxes him into putting on his wedding garment. Qinawi complies, then realizes he has donned a straitjacket. He struggles, but is taken away.

== Historical significance ==
Cairo Station debuted in 1958. With the overthrow of the Egyptian monarchy in 1952 (see Cinema of Egypt), Chahine's tackling of such themes as the urban working class, gender-based violence and sexual repression is important to highlight as it demonstrates filmmakers' ability to push the boundaries of Egyptian cinema, something they would be unable to do when the film industry was nationalized in 1966. By intermixing film genres (specifically Italian neorealism and film noir), Cairo Station vividly portrays Egyptian society as it was in the 1950s, and in doing so provides audiences a glimpse into Egypt's changing societal ideologies and values in a post-revolutionary world.

== Cast ==
- Farid Shawqi as Abu Siri (أبو سريع 'Abū Sirīʿ)
- Hind Rostom as Hannuma (هنومة Hanūma)
- Youssef Chahine as Qinawi (قناوي Qināwī)
- Hassan el Baroudi as Madbouli (مدبولي Madbūlī)
- Abdel Aziz Khalil as Abu Gaber (أبو قبر 'Abū Qabr)
- Naima Wasfy (Wasfi) as Hallawatim (حلاوتي Ḥalāwatī)
- Said Khalil
- Abdel Ghani Nagdi
- Loutfi El Hakim
- Abdel Hamid Bodaoha
- F. El Demerdache
- Said El Araby
- Ahmed Abaza
- Hana Abdel Fattah
- Safia Sarwat

== Critical reception ==
Upon its release in 1958, Cairo Station provoked outrage among Egyptian audiences, who were expecting "conventional melodramas and comedies that were staples of Egypt's early film industry." According to the same review, the film's treatment of suppressed sexuality and its adverse effect on Qinawi's mental health are both highlighted by Chahine's rendering of his "antihero", as well as by the fictional context, relating closely to social and psychological problems of a society marked by violent masculinity or the repression of workers' rights. Despite the film's initial lack of acceptance, a new generation of international film lovers discovered it in the 1970s, and in 2020, it was presented as part of a retrospective of Youssef Chahine's films on Netflix.

In 2002, Cairo Station was called "the highlight of the Chahine season at the National Film Theatre in London", and on the review aggregator Rotten Tomatoes, it received an overall score of 100%.

== Home media ==
The Criterion Collection announced a 4K digital restoration to be released on Blu-ray on August 12, 2025.

== See also ==
- Cinema of Egypt
- List of submissions to the 31st Academy Awards for Best Foreign Language Film
- List of Egyptian submissions for the Academy Award for Best Foreign Language Film
