= Ezzat El Alaili =

Egyptian actor (1934–2021)

- Born: 15 September 1934; Bab Al Sha'riyah, Cairo, Kingdom of Egypt
- Died: 5 February 2021 (aged 86); 6th of October City, Egypt
- Occupation: Actor
- Years active: 1962–2021
- Children: 2

Ezzat El Alaili (Arabic: عزت العلايلي) (15 September 1934 – 5 February 2021) was an Egyptian actor who starred in over 300 films, TV series, and theatre plays since the 1960s. He had his bachelor's degree from the Higher Institute of Theatre Studies in 1960.

== Awards ==
He won a lifetime achievement award from the Dubai International Film Festival in 2015. He was also honored at the Sharjah International Book Fair "for his significant contribution to Egyptian cinema over many decades and his highly creative interpretations of the best Egyptian and Arabic novels through a huge collection of films and TV series".

== Selected filmography ==
- Ressalah min emraa maghoula (1962) - Doctor
- Cairo (1963) - Third Officer
- Bayn el kasrain (1964)
- El rajul el maghul (1965)
- El jassus (1965)
- The Land (1970) - Abd El-Hadi
- Al-ikhtiyar (1971)
- The Game of Each Day (1971)
- Al-Nass wal Nil (1972) - Amin
- Bint badia (1972)
- Ghoroba' (1973)
- Kuwait Connection (1973) - Anwar
- A Story of Tutankhamun (1973) - Ahmed
- Al-abriaa (1974) - Mamdouh
- Zaier el-fager (1975) - Hassan Al Wakil
- Zat al Wajhein (1975) - Wael
- Ala mn notlik Al-Rosas (1975) - Adel
- La tatroukni wahdi (1975)
- Beirut Oh Beirut (1975)
- Al-saqqa mat (1977)
- Ayb Ya Lulu ... Ya Lulu Ayb (1978) - Kamal
- Alexandria... Why? (1979) - Shaker
- Ualla azae lel sayedat (1979) - Hamdi
- Al Qadisiyya (1981) - Saad
- People on the Top (1981) - Mohamed Fawzi
- Tabûnat al-sayyid Fabre (1983)
- Al-Majhoul (1984) - Naji
- Al Ens Wa Al Jinn (1985) - Osama
- El-Toot wel Nabboot (1986) - Ashour survivor
- El Towk Wa El Eswera (1986) - Bakhet / Moustafa
- La Todamerni Maak (1986) - Fares
- El Waratha (1986) - Ahmed
- Al sabr fi al-malahat (1986)
- Daqat Zar (1986) - Massoud
- Be'r El-khiana (1987) - Officer / Nader Lashin
- Well of Treason (1987)
- El Motarda Al Akhira (1987)
- Aad liyantaqim (1988) - Hashim
- Al Hubb Aydan Yamoot (1988) - Morad
- Bostan El Dam (1988)
- El Mealema Samah (1989) - Kamal
- Lela Assal (1990) - Hussien
- War in the Land of Egypt (1991)
- El-Fas fi el-Ras (1992) - Nagawi el-Markabi
- La dame du Caire (1992)
- Road to Eilat (1994) - Colonel Radi
- La Taktolou El-Hob (2001)
- Turab el Mass (2018) - Mahrous Bergas
- Qaed A'aely (2019)
