= The Nile and the Life =

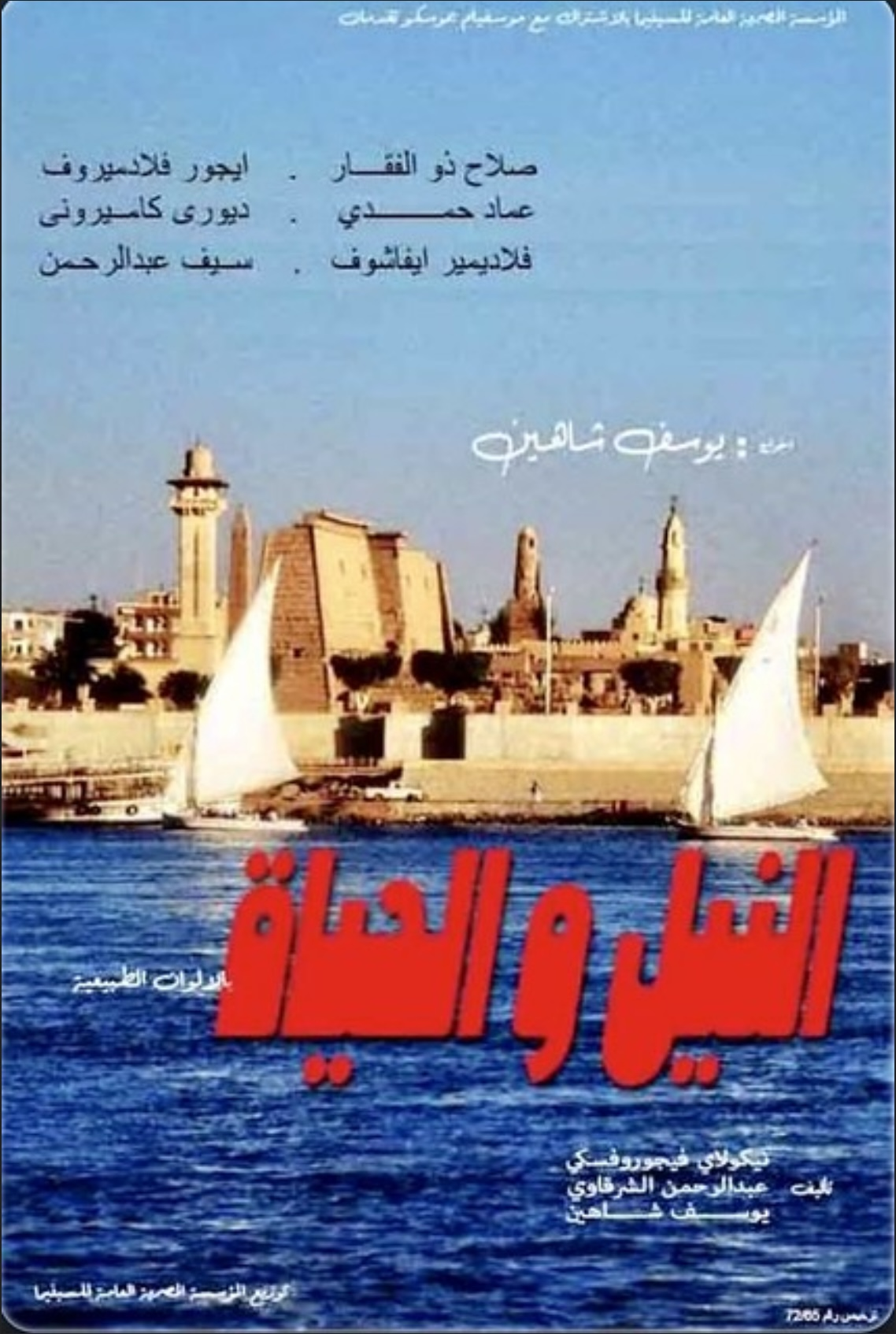
- Film poster
- Arabic: النيل والحياة
- Directed by: Youssef Chahine
- Screenplay by: Nikolai Ekk; Abd al-Rahman Sharqawi; Youssef Chahine
- Starring: Salah Zulfikar
- Music by: Aram Khachaturian
- Production company: Cairo Cinema • Mosfilm Mosco
- Release date: 1968
- Running time: 105 mins
- Countries: Egypt; Soviet Union
- Languages: Egyptian Arabic; Russian

The Nile and the Life (Arabic: النيل و الحياة, translit: El Nil w el Hayah) is a joint Egyptian/Soviet 1968 film starring Salah Zulfikar and directed by Youssef Chahine. It is written by Nikolai Ekk, Abd al-Rahman Sharqawi and Youssef Chahine.

== Plot ==
The film painted a picture of Egyptian society, as well as Soviet workers upon embarking on the dangerous project of building the High Dam. The film presents a vision of a nation deeply rooted in unity, as well as diversity. The film also presents a vision of a renewed image of the Egyptian nation, and inadvertently acknowledges a new understanding of its political goals and objectives, and how this affects the person within it.

== Production ==
In 1964, the Egyptian General Corporation for Cinema and Television had commissioned director Youssef Chahine to direct a huge colorful film glorifying the project of building the High Dam, but after the filming of the first film (The Nile and the Life) was finished in 1968, the General Film Organization rejected it, as opposed to the Russian side. The film was not shown in Egypt or abroad until the year 1999, when the film was later shown in France and was admired by the French audience and eventually shown in Egypt as well and earned critical recognition.

== Main cast ==
- Salah Zulfikar
- Igor Vladimirov
- Emad Hamdy
- Madiha Salem
- Valeria Ivashkov
- Vladimir Ivashov
- Valentina Khoutsenko
- Saif Abdul Rahman
- Abdul Majeed Barraqa
- Tawfiq Al-Daqn
- Zouzou Mady
- Youri Kamerny
- Svetalna Igoun
- Hassan Mustafa
- Mushira Ismail
- Mohamed Morched
- Mabrouka
