= Alexandria... New York =

2004 film

- Film poster
- Directed by: Youssef Chahine
- Written by: Youssef Chahine; Khaled Youssef
- Produced by: Humbert Balsan; Gabriel Khoury; Marianne Khoury
- Starring: Mahmoud Hemida
- Cinematography: Ramses Marzouk
- Edited by: Rashida Abdel Salam
- Release date: 7 July 2004
- Running time: 128 minutes
- Countries: Egypt; France
- Language: Arabic

Alexandria... New York (Arabic: إسكندرية .. نيويورك, translit. Iskandariyah.. New York, French: Alexandrie-New York) is a 2004 French-Egyptian drama film directed by Youssef Chahine. It was screened in the Un Certain Regard section at the 2004 Cannes Film Festival.

== Cast ==
- Mahmoud Hemida - Yehia (old) (as Mahmoud Hemeida)
- Ahmed Yehia - Yehia (young) / Alexander
- Yousra - Ginger (old)
- Yousra El Lozy - Ginger (young)
- Lebleba - Jeannie
- Hala Sedki - Bonnie
- Magda El-Khatib - Shanewise (as Magda El Khatib)
- Nelly Karim - Carmen
- Mohamed Hasabo
- Sanaa Younes - La concierge
- Suad Nasr - Zoé
- Yousra Selim - Bonnie (jeune)
- Mahmoud Saad - Le directeur du Festival de New York
- Mahmoud El Lozy - The Dean
- Hamdy El Sakhawy - Eric
- Bushra - Corinne
