= Alexandria... Why? =

1979 film

- DVD cover
- Directed by: Youssef Chahine
- Written by: Youssef Chahine; Mohsen Zayed
- Produced by: Youssef Chahine
- Starring: Naglaa Fathi
- Cinematography: Mohsen Nasr
- Edited by: Rachida Abdel Salam
- Release date: 1979
- Running time: 133 minutes
- Country: Egypt
- Language: Egyptian Arabic

Alexandria... Why? (Arabic: إسكندرية ليه, translit. Iskanderija... lih?) is a 1979 Egyptian drama film directed by Youssef Chahine. It was entered into the 29th Berlin International Film Festival, where it won the Silver Bear - Special Jury Prize. The film was selected as the Egyptian entry for the Best Foreign Language Film at the 52nd Academy Awards, but was not accepted as a nominee.

== Plot ==
The film portrays the early life of the director in his home city, Alexandria.

== Cast ==
- Naglaa Fathi as Sarah
- Mohsen Mohieddin as Yahia
- Farid Shawqi as Mohsen's father Shaker Pasha
- Mahmoud el-Meliguy as Qadry
- Ezzat El Alaili as Morsi
- Youssef Wahbi
- Yehia Chahine
- Laila Fawzi
- Aeela Rateb
- Ahmed Zaki as Ibrahim
- Gerry Sundquist as Thomas 'Tommy' Friskin
- Ahmed Bedier

== Analysis ==
According to scholar Wisam Kh. Abdul-Jabbar, Alexandria... Why? explores questions of identity, belonging, and national crisis through the eyes of its director, Youssef Chahine. Drawing on his own experiences growing up in 1940s Alexandria, Chahine blends autobiography with historical and political events to show how personal stories are shaped by larger social forces. The film does not present a single, unified idea of what it means to be Egyptian. Instead, it reflects a diverse, conflicted society marked by colonialism, war, and cultural mixing. Its use of multiple languages, dream-like scenes, and characters from different backgrounds creates a picture of a nation that is searching for itself.

The film also shows how private life through family, love, education, and personal dreams is tied up with politics and power. Yahia, the main character, expresses himself through Hollywood fantasies and Shakespeare in the classroom, using art to both escape and challenge the colonial world around him. One subplot, involving a British soldier and an Egyptian aristocrat, shows how personal relationships can reflect deeper tensions between colonizer and colonized. By weaving these stories together, Chahine suggests that national identity is not something fixed or simple, but something built from many voices and experiences, often in times of struggle and uncertainty.

== Reception ==
The film has been included in the 2006 Bibliotheca Alexandrina's 100 Greatest Egyptian Films.

== See also ==
- List of submissions to the 52nd Academy Awards for Best Foreign Language Film
- List of Egyptian submissions for the Academy Award for Best Foreign Language Film
