= Yehia Chahine =

Egyptian film producer and actor

- يحيى شاهين
- Born: Yehia Yehia Hasan Chahine; 28 July 1917; Imbabah, Egypt
- Died: 18 March 1994 (aged 76); Egypt
- Occupations: Film actor, producer

Yehia Chahine (Arabic: يحيى شاهين, Yeḥyā Shāheen) (28 July 1917 – 18 March 1994) was an Egyptian film producer and an actor of film and theatre. He is most notable for his role in the Egyptian Cinema's film adaptations of the Cairo Trilogy, a trilogy written by the Nobel Prize-winning Egyptian author Naguib Mahfouz.

== Life and career ==
Yehia Chahine was born in Imbaba, Giza. His father's name was Yehia Chahine too. He received a diploma in performing arts and started acting in theatre. His first performance was in the play Murtafa`t wa Darag (Heights and Stairs). In 1935, he acted in his first film.

He acted in numerous films, but his most notable role is that of Al-Sayyid Ahmad Abd al-Jawad, a Cairene patriarch, in the Cairo Trilogy films. The three films, Bayn al-Qasrayn (Palace Walk, which is based on the Palace Walk novel) in 1964, Qasr al-Shawq (Palace of Desire) in 1967 and Al-Sukkariya (Sugar Street) in 1973, were set in Cairo and followed the family of Abd al-Jawwad across three generations, from World War I to the overthrow of King Farouk in 1952. They were well received and successful in Egypt and the Arab world.

Yehia Chahine in one of his films

Additionally, he has acted in many other successful films. He starred in film director Youssef Chahine's Ibn al-Nile (Son of the Nile) along with Faten Hamama in 1951. He played a leading role in the 1954 film Gaalouni Mujriman (I Have Been Made a Murderer), which was based on a novel by Naguib Mahfouz. In 1957, he starred in La Anam (Sleepless), a film that was chosen as one of the best 150 Egyptian film productions. His last film role was in 1988, in the film Kul Hatha al-Hub (All this Love).

Chahine received several awards for his film roles. In 1993, he received the Sciences and Arts prize. He died at the age of 76, on 18 March 1994.

== Films ==
=== Selected works ===
- 1940: "Dananeer" (دنانير)
- 1945: "Sallama" (سلامه)
- 1947: "Azhar wa Ashwak" (أزهار وأشواك)
- 1958: "Haza Howa el hob" ( هذا هو الحب)
- 1964: "Bain al-Qasrain" (بين القصرين)
- 1966: "Thalath Losoos" (ثلاث لصوص)
- 1967: "Qasr al-Shawq" (قصر الشوق)
- 1968: "The Splendor of Love" (روعة الحب)
- 1969: "Shey Min el Khouf" (شيء من الخوف)
- 1973: "Al Sokkareyah" (السكرية)
