= Abd al-Rahman Sharqawi =

Egyptian poet

Abd al-Rahman al-Sharqawi (1921–1987) was an Egyptian writer.

== Books and studies about him ==
- Confessions of Abd al-Rahman al-Sharqawi, Mustafa Abd al-Ghani, The Supreme Council of Culture, Cairo, 1996
- Al-Sharqawi, a rebel, Mustafa Abdel-Ghani, Dar Al-Taawon, Cairo, 1987.
