= Mahmoud el-Meliguy =

Egyptian actor (1910–1983)

Mahmoud el-Meligy
- محمود المليجي
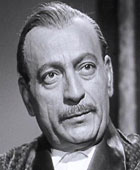
- Born: 22 December 1910; Cairo, Egypt
- Died: 6 June 1983 (aged 72); Cairo, Egypt
- Occupations: Actor, screenwriter
- Years active: 1910 - 1983
- Spouse: Alwiya Gamil (1939 – 1983)
- Children: 3

Mahmoud el-Meligy (Arabic: محمود المليجي, Maḥmoūd el-Meleygī; 22 December 1910 – 6 June 1983) was an Egyptian screenwriter and an actor of film, theater, and television. He started his career playing minor roles but achieved stardom in the late 1930s. A popular and award-winning actor, he has acted in hundreds of films and was famous for his evil, villain roles.

== Career ==
El-Meligy is the descendant of an Egyptian family that took its name from the Egyptian city of Melieg in Monufia Governorate. His breakthrough role came when Mohamed Abdel Wahab chose him to star in the film Lastu Mallak (I'm Not an Angel). He was paid 900 Egyptian pounds and quickly achieved stardom. People praised him for the villain role he played in that film, and film critics described him as “the wickedness of cinema”.

== Personal life ==
Mahmoud el-Meligy met the Egyptian actress Alwiya Gamil in 1938 and married her in 1939. He acted in several films with her. The couple had a happy and strong relationship. They did not have children together but raised two sons, Gamal El-Din and Morsi, and a daughter, Isis, from Alwiya's previous marriage. In 1963, after 24 years of his marriage to Alwiya Gamil, he married another woman, a young actress named Fawziyah al-Ansari, but their marriage lasted no longer than three days. Alwiya had allegedly compelled him to divorce her. His marriage with Alwiya Gamil ended in 1983, with his death.

== Selected filmography ==
- 1936: Weddad
- 1942: Ibn El-balad
- 1944: Berlanti
- 1947: Prisoner of Darkness
- 1949: The Flirtation of Girls
- 1951: Son of the Nile
- 1951: Your Day Will Come
- 1952: Ament Bellah
- 1953: A Million Pounds
- 1954: The Unjust Angel
- 1954: Delight of My Eyes
- 1957: The Tough
- 1958: Today’s Youth
- 1958: Jamila, the Algerian
- 1961: Oh Islam
- 1962: The Cursed Palace
- 1963: Saladin
- 1968: The Splendor of Love
- 1970: Sunset and Sunrise
- 1970: The Land
- 1971: Confessions of A Woman
- 1971: The Choice
- 1972: Featureless Men
- 1972: Those People of the Nile
- 1972: A Call for Life
- 1972: The Sparrow
- 1974: Dunya
- 1976: The Return of the Prodigal Son
- 1978: Roadless Traveller
- 1981: Zeyara Serreya
- 1982: An Egyptian Story
- 1983: Ayoub

== Awards received ==
For his prior and distinguished work, he was honored by the Arab Republic of Egypt and won the gold medal for the first distinguished people. He won the “State Encouragement Award for Acting” in 1972, and a “Certificate of Appreciation” on the Art Festival in 1977. He was also appointed as a member of the Shura Council, in 1980, and he obtained many awards, including the Medal of Sciences and Arts» in 1946, and the Medal of Cedar, from Lebanon.
