= Youssef Chahine =

Egyptian film director (1926–2008)

OME Youssef Chahine
- يوسف شاهين
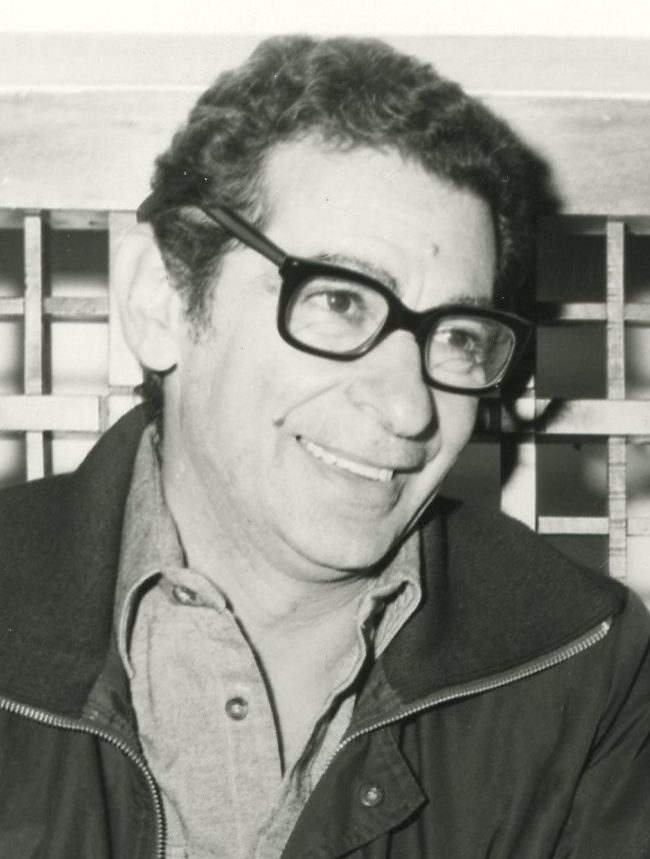
- Youssef Chahine in 1978
- Born: Youssef Gabriel Chahine; 25 January 1926; Alexandria, Kingdom of Egypt
- Died: 27 July 2008 (aged 82); Cairo, Egypt
- Occupations: Film director, Actor, Writer and Producer.
- Notable work: Full list
- Relatives: Marianne Khoury (niece)

Youssef Chahine (Arabic: يوسف شاهين [ˈjuːsɪf ʃæˈhiːn]; 25 January 1926 – 27 July 2008) was an Egyptian film director. He was active in the Egyptian film industry from 1950 until his death in 2008. He directed twelve films included in a list of Top 100 Egyptian films published by the Cairo International Film Festival. As a winner of the Cannes 50th Anniversary Award (for lifetime achievement), Chahine was credited with launching the career of actor Omar Sharif. A well-regarded director with critics, he was often present at film festivals during the earlier decades of his work. Chahine gained his largest international audience as one of the co-directors of 11'9"01 September 11 (2002).

== Childhood and early life ==
Chahine (Fr. pronounced Shaaheen) was born in Alexandria, Egypt to a Melkite Greek Catholic family. His father was an attorney originally from Zahle, Lebanon and was a supporter of the Egyptian nationalist Wafd Party. His mother, Claire Bastorous was of Greek descent. She worked as a tailor. Although Chahine was raised Catholic, he was not a believer in organized religion. If asked of his religion, he would state, "Egyptian". At home, the Chahines spoke five languages, which was common in cosmopolitan Alexandria at the time.

Chahine had affectionate parents and had a strong relationship with both of them, even though his mother and father had distinct personalities. At a young age, he knew what he wanted to become. Chahine would stay under his bed and in his room for hours, picturing himself in the industry- whether in a projection theater, a cinema hall or a production company.

When asked about his childhood and early interest in cinema, Chahine said:

"At the age of Eight, I discovered that 9.5mm films and projectors were being sold in stores. I saved from allowances enough to buy the projector and then became a regular for the Rabbani Bibi films. I used to gather the children of the neighborhood to show them these films. Some of them didn’t care for cinema and would come up with excuses not to attend. So I had no choice but to form a gang to beat up those who were late coming to the show."

In the following years, two concepts raged Chahine and gagged his interest: indulging in sexual fantasies and cinema. A few years later, Chahine dealt with the death of his brother Alfred, who was only two years older than him. Chahine always remembered Alfred's eyes, which influenced his work. Most of his male actors had eyes that resembled Alfred's.

According to Chahine, his father was honest, which seeped into his values and was a trait he appreciated having. Along with honesty, Chahine's father ignited his love for books. Being a lawyer, Chahine's father could not keep up with the tuition bills, so he closed up his law office and took a job in the legal department in the Alexandria municipality so he could send Chahine to Victoria College. Another memory Chahine was fond of, was how his father took him to the desert and taught him how to look for landmarks and find his way back home. Scouting for film locations often brought back these memories. Their home was aristocratic, even though they were not rich. They had to be well mannered, and mistakes had punishments (which usually meant having dinner alone in the kitchen rather than outside on the family table) Despite them being tight on money, they would still have guests over for dinner and lived without paying much attention to bank statements.

== Education ==
Fascinated by the performing arts from an early age, young Chahine began to create shows at home for his family. Chahine began his education at a Frères' school Collège Saint Marc. Growing up, he attended Alexandria's elite Victoria College. After graduating from Victoria college in 1944, he was determined to go abroad to fulfill his passions. His parents refused, and tried to talk him out of it. They enrolled him in the college of Engineering at the University of Alexandria, but Chahine refused and later said that he had to "blackmail them, and almost jump out of the window." He was later able to get what he wanted, and enrolled in the Pasadena Playhouse in California where he studied theater and television, but not film. Out of the 200 students that attended, only thirteen took the final examination, and only four passed, with Chahine ranking first.

After returning from Pasadena, Chahine didn't work in Egyptian theater or film. Instead, he worked in 20th Century Fox's publicity department, where he worked with Gianni Vernuccio and Alvise Orfanelli. During this time, a producer turned to Chahine to finish a film after the director had left following a quarrel, but Chahine refused to complete someone else's work. On another occasion, Chahine was offered the position of Assistant Director, which he also refused, stating that he was working on Hollywood theaters beforehand and an Assistant Director role was not for him.

== Starting as a director ==
After returning to Egypt, he turned his attention to directing. Cinematographer Alvise Orfanelli helped Chahine into the film business. Chahine directed his first feature film in 1950, Baba Amin (Daddy Amin) at the age of 23, two years before the Egyptian revolution of 1952 that saw the overthrow of the monarchy and the rise of the charismatic leader Gamal Abdel Nasser. One year later, with Son of the Nile (1951) he was first invited to the Cannes Film Festival. Sira' fi-l-Wadi (Struggle in the Valley) introduced Omar Sharif to the cinematic screen. In 1970 he was awarded a Golden Tanit at the Carthage Film Festival for al-Ikhtiyar (The Choice). With The Sparrow (1972), in which he showed his political opinions after the Six-Day War with Israel, he directed the first Egypt–Algeria co-production.

He won the Silver Bear – Special Jury Priz at the 29th Berlin International Film Festival for Alexandria... Why? (1978), the first instalment in what would prove to be an autobiographic quartet, completed with An Egyptian Story (1982), Alexandria, Again and Forever (1990), and Alexandria...New York (2004). The producer Humbert Balsan went to Cannes in 2004 with Alexandria... New York, his ninth film with the Egyptian director since 1985's Adieu, Bonaparte. In one of his films The Sixth Day (1986), an adaptation of a novel written in French by Lebanese writer André Chedid, the famous Egyptian singer Dalida was the protagonist in the role of a poor Egyptian woman.

About his work, Chahine has said, "I make my films first for myself. Then for my family. Then for Alexandria. Then for Egypt," Chahine once famously said. "If the Arab world likes them, ahlan wa sahlan (welcome). If the foreign audience likes them, they are doubly welcome."

== Significant films ==
During his long career Chahine produced different movies, including Aly Badrakhan's Chafika et Metwal (1979). His early films in Egypt included The Blazing Sun (1954), which begun while Farouk was still King and dealing with a peasant farmer's challenge to a feudal landlord. In 1992 Jacques Lassalle approached him to stage a piece of his choice for Comédie-Française. Chahine agreed and chose to adapt Albert Camus' Caligula. The same year he started writing The Emigrant (1994), a story inspired by the Biblical character of Joseph, son of Jacob.

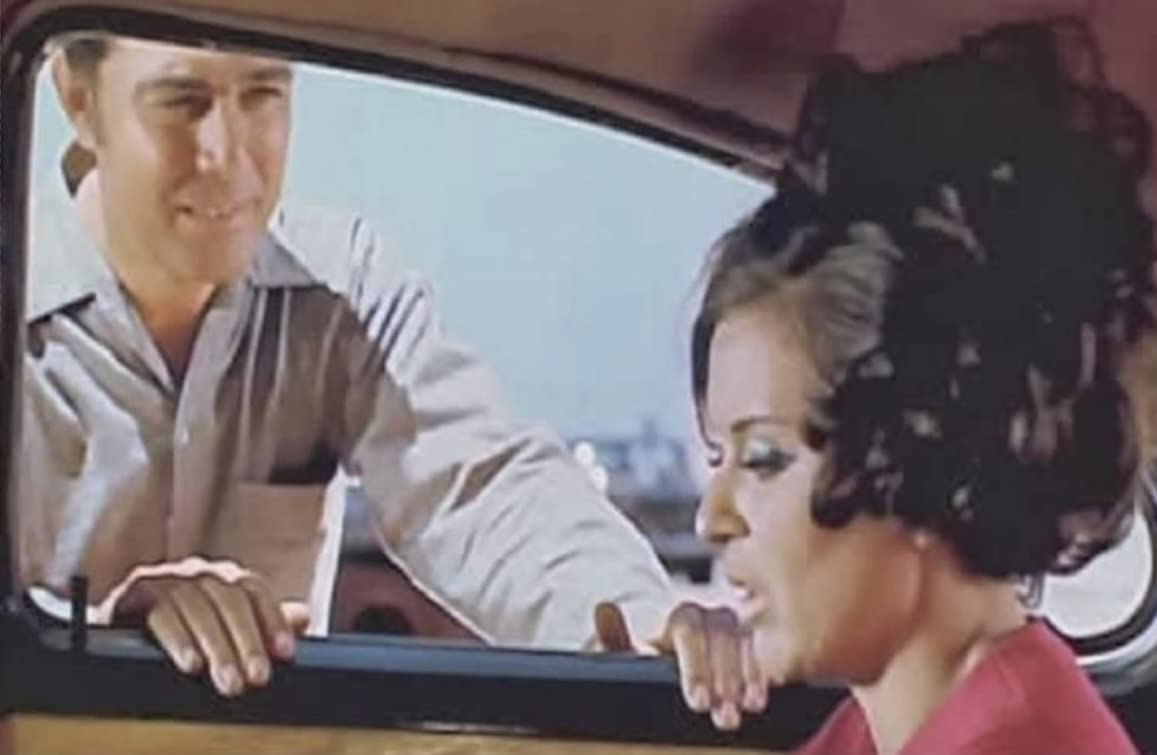
Salah Zulfikar and Soad Hosny in Chahine's Those People of the Nile (1972)

This had been an intended project for some years and he was finally able to film it in 1994. This film created a controversy in Egypt between liberals and fundamentalists who opposed the depiction of religious characters in films. In 1997, 46 years later, his work was acknowledged at the Cannes Film Festival with the lifetime achievement award. Chahine is credited for directing five films starring Salah Zulfikar including significant productions such as Saladin the Victorious (1963), The Nile and the Life (1968) and Those People of the Nile (1972) and also credited for discovering Omar Sharif, whose first starring role was in The Blazing Sun (1954). He also provided Hind Rostom with a role early on in her career in Cairo Station (1958).

Chahine produced his four autobiographical films starting 1978 and up till 2004. These films tell Yehia's life, which reflects Chahine's own. In this quartet, he explores his sexuality, personality, and family issues. The autobiographical films all take place between World War One and World War Two.

Released in 1979, and set in the 1940s, Alexandria... Why? Sparked controversy and censorship from the government- it examines Egypt's social and political issues. An Egyptian Story, released later in 1982, Chahine looks at his own journey as an auteur and a director.

In 1989, Chahine released his third autobiographical film Alexandria Again and Forever. This film follows a strike that the actors and actresses, as well as production workers in the Egyptian film industry participate in. The film is a political commentary on censorship in Egypt. Chahine uses many directorial styles: verité, normal narrative and formalism.

The fourth and final film to the autobiographical film is Alexandria ... New York (2004). The film draws a parallel between Chahine's life and the narrative he tells: it explores the relationship between the United States and Egypt.

=== Cairo Station ("Bab al-Hadid", 1958) ===
The film is set in Cairo train station and features mainly Kinawi (played by Youssef Chahine), a mentally unstable newspaper seller that is madly in love with Hanouma, who works as an illegal cold drinks vendor at the same station. Kinawi cuts pictures of women from magazines for the little cabin that he lives in, and has a psychosexual obsession with Hanouma (played by the acknowledged actress Hind Rostom), who is engaged to Abou Seri' (Farid Shawki), porter and trade union organiser. In a turn of events, Kinawi attacks Halawithom, Hanouma's friend.

=== Jamila al-Jaza'iriyya ("Jamila, The Algerian", 1958) ===
Jamila Bouhired, often known as Jamila. was an Algerian and Arab symbol of resistance. Jamila sees the French Army arrest her friend. She then volunteers to join the National Liberation Front. After a while, she is promoted to an organizer because of her intelligence. Eventually she is arrested and tortured in prison. She is put on trial in a military court and they try to accidentally kill him, as they have disposed of many witnesses. Luckily, the lawyer survives but the court still gives her the death penalty. The resistance movements rile up and Jamila is a symbol of inspiration and resistance to the Arab world.

It premiered at the Moscow Film Festival in 1959, with the French government's dismay. The film gained high critical recognition in the festival specially for Salah Zulfikar and Ahmed Mazhar, the lead actors in the film. However it was not shown on Egyptian television for many years. According to Magda, the lead actress and producer of the film, Egypt had banned the screening in order to not harm political relations with France.

=== Saladin (original title: El Nasser Salah Ed-Din ("Saladin, The Victorious", 1963) ===
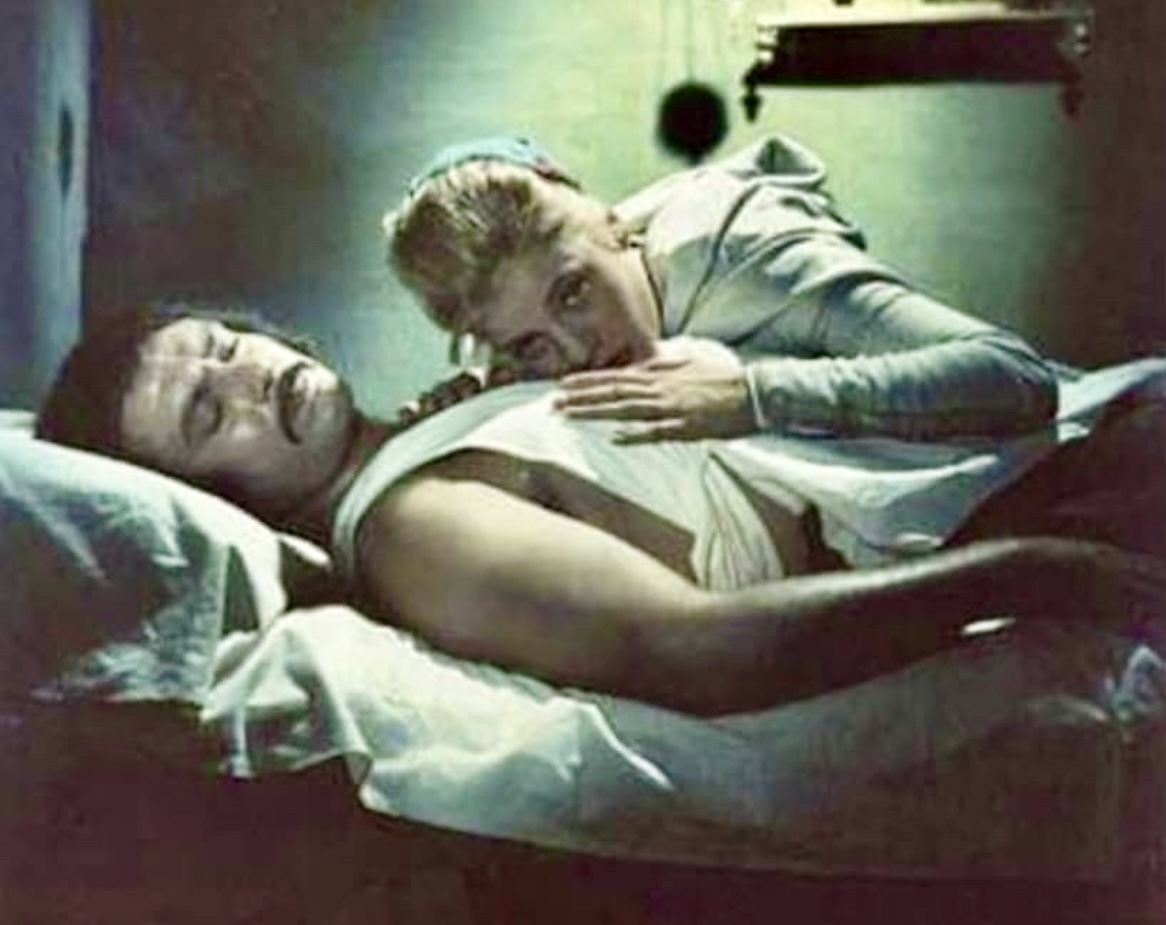
Salah Zulfikar and Nadia Lutfi in Saladin the Victorious (1963)

Chahine made an epic, three-hour film in widescreen named after the 12th century Ayyubid sultan who, as the film begins, is preparing to liberate Jerusalem from its Crusader occupiers. It was scripted by Ezz El-Dine Zulficar, Naguib Mahfouz and the poet and progressive writer, Abderrahman Cherkaoui.

A parallel between Saladin and President Nasser, a champion of pan-Arabism, is easily drawn. Saladin is portrayed as an educated and peaceful man—at one point he is asked to give clandestine medical help to Richard the Lion Heart, who was shot by an arrow. Saladin later tells him: "Religion is God’s and the Earth is for all ... I guarantee to all Christians in Jerusalem the same rights as are enjoyed by Muslims."

Chahine was well aware of the propaganda dimension that implicitly painted President Nasser as a modern-era Saladin, stating "My own sympathies were with pan-Arabism, which I still believe in." The main reason he made the film was to prove that an epic film with a small budget, by global cinema standards, was feasible. From then on, he only produced colour films.

=== Al Ard ("The Earth", 1968) ===
A novel by Cherkaoui, serialised, formed the basis of The Earth, and is noted particularly for its image of the peasant farmer – "eternal 'damned of the earth'" – which broke with "the ridiculous image the cinema had (hitherto) given him" (Khaled Osman). There followed a further collaboration with Mahfouz on The Choice.

=== Al Ikhtiyar ("The Choice", 1970) ===
The protagonist of the film is schizophrenic, a fact that the audience discovers well into the film. The film mainly follows the police as they try to solve the murder of Mahmoud, who is believed to be the unidentified corpse in the beginning of the film. The older detectives believe that Sayyid, Mahmoud's twin brother killed him. While a young assistant questions whether this is self-deception and not even a real crime.

=== Al Usfur ("The Sparrow", 1972) ===
The film deals with the aftermath of the Six Day War and Nasser's announcement of the defeat and his subsequent resignation.

Bahiyya, the main character runs into the street, followed by a growing crowd, shouting "No! we must fight. We won’t accept defeat!"—an iconic scene in Egyptian cinema.

=== Iskinderiya.. leh? ("Alexandria, Why?", 1978) ===
Yehia, a young Victoria College student, is obsessed with Hollywood and dreams of cinema. It is 1942, the Germans are about to enter Alexandria, a thought that is preferable to the presence of the British in Egypt.

=== Hadduta Masriya ("An Egyptian Story", 1982) ===
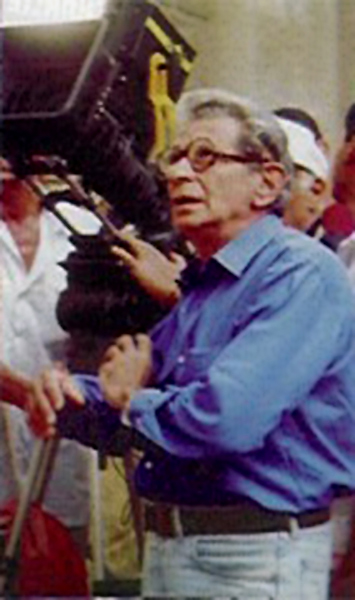
Youssef Chahine in 1982

As a result of a heart operation, he reviews his life: moments of Chahine's own films are replayed against their autobiographical and social historical context.

Memory is very important to Chahine's most recent work —whether of the "city of my childhood, Alexandria, between the two world wars tolerant, secular, open to Muslims, Christians and Jews" or of a more distant past: such as evoked in Adieu Bonaparte (1985), based on the cultural aspect of Bonaparte's expedition into Egypt (1798). "Out of this marvelous confrontation there was a rebirth of Egyptian consciousness, of its past ... which belongs to humanity."

=== Al-Massir ("Destiny", 1997) ===
Set in Andalusia in the 12th century, "Destiny" is a historical drama about Ibn Rushd, a prominent Muslim thinker known for his debates with Muslim theologians and treatises on Aristotle. The film portrays his friendship with a group of intellectuals and artists, including a singer played by Mohamed Mounir, who come under attack from a rising movement of militant fundamentalists backed by the region's ruler, Caliph al-Mansour. The film incorporates political themes and songs that can be seen as allegorical, since it was produced and released during a period when Egypt was experiencing a series of Islamist terrorist attacks.

== Controversies ==
Despite being internationally renowned and successful in Egypt, Chahine has often been the center of controversies due to his liberal views, portrayal of sexuality and political critique.

Cairo Station, albeit a classic of Egyptian cinema, shocked viewers both by the sympathy with which a "fallen woman" is depicted and by the violence with which another is killed. It was also a style that Egyptian audiences were not used to, hence it was rejected by the public, but still received appraisal from critics.

The Sparrow (1972) attacked Egyptian corruption and blamed it for the defeat in the Six Day War, which gained backlash from government supporters.

During the several following years, Chahine found himself increasingly in conflict with the government-backed film industry of Egypt and its heavy political restrictions in filmmaking. In 1964, after filming (1965, Dawn of a New Day), he traveled to Lebanon, where he shot two musicals: Bayya al-Khawatim (1965, Ring Seller) and Rimal al-Dhahab (1967, Sands of Gold). Ring Seller became one of the best musicals of Arab cinema, bringing success to Youssef Chahine, whereas Sands of Gold, due to delays in shooting and its box-office failure, forced him to quit his work in Lebanon and return to Egypt.

In 1994, with the release of Al Mohaguer (The Emigrant), Chahine ran into trouble with fundamentalists. The film tells the story of Joseph, and Islam does not condone the drawing, or acting out the role of a prophet. The film was initially banned awaiting a lawsuit that Chahine eventually won, however, it was still not screened. Chahine criticized the increasing influence of Islamic fundamentalism on Egyptian culture under the government of Hosni Mubarak, saying "The Egyptian has always been a very religious person, but at the same time he is also a lover of life and art and music and theater." He also blamed the Arab states of the Persian Gulf, and particularly Saudi Arabia, for their influence.

He again found himself at conflict with fundamentalists after the release of Al Masir ("Destiny") which tells the story of Andalucian Arab philosopher, Abu al-Walid ibn Ahmad ibn Rushd (known in the west as Averroes). The film's goal was to initiate religious tolerance, however, it was seen as disrespectful to Ibn Rushd.

Upon the release of Al Akhar (The Other) in 1999, the film caused some public controversy. The film features a mother who exposes a woman's scam after she and her son had fallen in love and planned to marry. We later discover in the film that the mother's relationship to her son was somewhat sexual. The film was not banned, and screened normally in theaters and on televisions.

== Gay-bisexual themes in his work ==
Chahine frequently included gay or bisexual themes in his work. Alexandria... Why? (1979) tells the story of two young men—one Egyptian, the other European—who fall in love during World War II. Yehia's cousin is gay and 'buys' drunken British soldiers. In An Egyptian Story (1982), Yehia is a film-maker, going to London (as Chahine had earlier) for open-heart surgery. He has a brief affair with a taxi driver.

== Illness and death ==
Chahine was hospitalised at El Shorouq hospital in Cairo, having fallen into a coma following an apparent cerebral haemorrhage, on Sunday, 15 June 2008. On Monday, 16 June 2008, Chahine was flown to Paris on an emergency flight and admitted to the American Hospital in Neuilly-sur-Seine, west of Paris, where his niece told AFP his condition was "critical but stable."

Youssef Chahine died in his Cairo home on Sunday, 27 July 2008. He was survived by his wife, Colette.

== Tribute ==
In 2008, he was honored by BAFTA for his contribution to film.

On 25 January 2015, Google Doodle commemorated his 89th birthday.

== Nominations and awards ==
Cannes Film Festival

2004	Nominee Un Certain Regard Award	Alexandrie... New York (2004)
1999	Winner François Chalais Award	El Akhar (1999)
1999	Nominee Un Certain Regard Award	El Akhar (1999)
1997	Winner 50th Anniversary Prize	Lifetime Achievement Award for his whole works.
1997	Nominee Palme d'Or	Al-massir (1997)
1985	Nominee Palme d'Or	Adieu Bonaparte (1985)
1970	Nominee Palme d'Or	Al-ard (1970)
1954	Nominee Grand Prize of the Festival	Siraa Fil-Wadi (1954)
1952	Nominee Grand Prize of the Festival	Ibn el Nil (1952)

Berlin International Film Festival

1979	Winner Silver Bear	Alexandria, Why? (1978)

Amiens International Film Festival

1997	Winner OCIC Award	Al-massir (1997)

Cairo National Festival for Egyptian Cinema

1995	Winner Horus Award	Best Director Al-mohager (1994)

Carthage Film Festival

1970	Winner Tanit d'Or	Al-ikhtiyar (1970)

Chicago International Film Festival

2001	Nominee Gold Hugo	Best Feature Skoot hansawwar (2001)
1979	Nominee Gold Hugo	Best Feature Iskanderija... lih? (1979)

Dubai International Film Festival

2007	Winner Lifetime Achievement Award

Moscow International Film Festival

1963	Nominee Grand Prix	El Naser Salah el Dine (1963)
1959	Nominee Grand Prix	Hubb lel-abad (1959)

Murex D'Or

2003	Winner Murex d'Or Award	Lifetime Achievement

New York Film Festival

1999	Nominee Grand Marnier Fellowship Award	Best Film El Akhar (1999)

Toronto International Film Festival

2007	Nominee People's Choice Award	Masters Heya fawda (2007)
1999	Nominee People's Choice Award	Masters El Akhar (1999)

== See also ==
- Cinema of Egypt
- Ezz El-Dine Zulficar
- List of Egyptians
