= The Eloquent Peasant (film) =

- Arabic: الفلاح الفصيح
- Directed by: Shadi Abdel Salam
- Written by: Shadi Abdel Salam
- Starring: Ahmed Marei; Ahmad Hegazi; Anan Ahmad
- Cinematography: Mustafa Imam
- Edited by: Kamal Abul Ela
- Music by: Soliman Gamil
- Production company: Arab Egyptian Films
- Release date: 1970
- Running time: 21 minute
- Country: Egypt
- Language: Arabic

The Eloquent Peasant (Arabic: الفلاح الفصيح translit. Al-Fallah al-Fasih) is a 1970 Egyptian short film written and directed by Shadi Abdel Salam, based on the tale of The Eloquent Peasant, which dates to the Middle Kingdom (c. 2040 – 1782 BCE).

The film had its world premiere at the 31st Venice International Film Festival. It was restored and preserved by the World Cinema Project alongside Abdel Salam's The Night of Counting the Years (1969).

== Plot ==
The peasant Khun-anup tricked by the unscrupulous Nemtynakht, is forced to rely on his own eloquence to convince lord Rensi's lands about his needs of justice.

== Cast ==
- Ahmed Marei as Khun-anup
- Ahmed Anan as Rensi
- Ahmed Hegazi as Nemtynakht

== Bibliography ==
- Colla, Elliott (2000-10-06). Beyond Colonialism and Nationalism in the Maghrib: History, Culture, and Politics. New York: Palgrave Macmillan. pp. 109–146 ("Shadi Abd al-Salam's al-Mumiya: Ambivalence and the Egyptian Nation-State"). ISBN 978-0-312-22287-1.

== See also ==
- Egyptian films of the 1970s
- List of Egyptian films of 1970
