= Jadwiga Lipińska =

Polish Egyptologist

Professor Jadwiga Lipińska
- Born: Jadwiga Freyer; 29 November 1932; Warsaw
- Died: 4 October 2009 (aged 76); Warsaw
- Occupation: Egyptologist

Academic background
- Education: University of Warsaw
- Doctoral advisor: Kazimierz Michałowski

Academic work
- Discipline: Egyptology, Art History, Archaeology
- Institutions: National Museum, Warsaw

Jadwiga Lipińska née Freyer (29 November 1932 – 4 October 2009) was a Polish Egyptologist.

== Biography ==
Lipińska was the daughter of Edward Freyer and Zofia Kodis, an artist. She graduated from the University of Warsaw with her masters (1956) and her doctorate (1964) as a student of Prof. Kazimierz Michalowski. Following her studies, she went on to work at the National Museum, Warsaw from 1958. She began as an assistant in the Gallery of Ancient Art and by 1991, she became curator of the Gallery of Ancient Art, a position she held until she retired in 2002. She also lectured at University of Warsaw, and Akademii Teologii Katolickiej in Warsaw and the University of Lodz. In 1991, she was made Professor of Humanities.

She was active in excavations in Egypt from 1960 until her retirement with the Polish Centre of Mediterranean Archaeology, including:

- Tell Atrib (1960, 1963, 1965)
- Alexandria (1963)
- Faras, Sudan (1962-1963)
- Palmyra, Syria (1965)

She also published on the nearby Temple of Hatshepsut at Deir el-Bahari, an expedition founded in 1961 by her colleague and advisor, Kazimierz Michalowski. Her main excavation focus from 1961 to 1996 was the nearby Temple of Thutmose III project at Deir el-Bahari, and from 1978 to 1996, she directed the site. This expedition at the Temple of Hatshepsut uncovered the previously unknown Temple of Thutmose III in 1962, which she wrote her habilitation thesis on in 1977. She then went on to publish two volumes on the Temple of Thutmose III in 1974 and 1988.

In 1982, Lipińska created and published a catalogue of the Egyptian collection in Havana. She also gave multiple lectures internationally. A Festschrift was dedicated to Lipińska in 1997, edited by Joanna Aksamit, Essays in honour of Prof. Dr. Jadwiga Lipińska, it included essays by Helmut Satzinger, Andrzej Niwinski, Charles Van Siclen, Eleonora Kormysheva and Karol Myśliwiec, among others. She was also an active member of the International Council of Museums (ICOM), particularly in the CIPEG (The International Committee of ICOM for Egyptology).

She died in Warsaw on 4 October 2009.

== Publications ==
Lipińska published over 100 books, articles, and book chapters in Polish, French and English, below are a selection of her publications:

=== Books ===
- Lipińska, Jadwiga. (1964) Amulety egipskie.
- Lipińska, Jadwiga. (1969). 500 Zagadek O Starożytnym Egipcie. Wiedza Powszechna.
- Lipińska, Jadwiga. (1977). T he Temple of Tuthmosis III: architecture. PWN-Éditions scientifiques de Pologne.
- Lipińska, Jadwiga. (1980). Dwa złote pierścienie egipskie ze zbiorów galerii sztuki starożytnej muzeum narodowego w warszawie. National Museum, Warsaw
- Lipińska, Jadwiga (1982). Monuments de l'egypte ancienne : au palacio de bellas artes à la havane et du museo bacardí à santiago de cuba. P. von Zabern.
- Lipińska, Jadwiga. (1982). Sztuka Egipska. Wydawnictwa Artystyczne i Filmowe.
- Lipińska, Jadwiga. (1984). The Temple of Tuthmosis III: statuary and votive monuments. PWN-Editions scientifiques de Pologne.
- Lipińska, Jadwiga. (2003). W Cieniu Piramid. Zakład Narodowy im. Ossolińskich - Wydaw.
- Lipińska, Jadwiga and Koziński Wiesław. (1977). Cywilizacja Miedzi I Kamienia: Technika Starożytnego Egiptu. Państ. Wydaw. Naukowe.
- Lipińska, Jadwiga and Marek Marciniak. (1986). Mitologia Starożytnego Egipto. Wyd. Artystyczne i Filmowe.

=== Articles and chapters ===
- Lipińska, Jadwiga. (1967). Names and history of the sanctuaries built by Tuthmosis III at Deir el-Baḥri. Journal of Egyptian Archaeology 53, 25–33.
- Lipińska, Jadwiga. (1969). Inscriptions of Amenemone from the temple of Tuthmosis III at Deir el-Bahari. Zeitschrift für ägyptische Sprache und Altertumskunde 96 (1), 28–30.
- Lipińska, Jadwiga. (1971). A note on the problem of false mummies. Études et Travaux 5, 65–69.
- Lipińska, Jadwiga. (1977). An example of ancient Egyptian restoration of sculpture. In Endesfelder, Erika, Karl Heinz Priese, Walter Friedrich Reineke, and Steffen Wenig (eds), Ägypten und Kusch: Fritz Hintze zum 60. Geburtstag, 279–281. Berlin: Akademie Verlag.
- Lipińska, Jadwiga. (1979). The Egyptian collection in the National Museum in Havana. In Reineke, Walter F. (ed.), Acts: First International Congress of Egyptology, Cairo October 2–10, 1976, 425–426. Berlin: Akademie-Verlag.
- Lipinska, Jadwiga. (1990). Stela of the sculptor Ken. In Schmitz, Bettina and Arne Eggebrecht (eds), Festschrift Jürgen von Beckerath: zum 70. Geburtstag am 19. Februar 1990, 171–174. Hildesheim: Gerstenberg.
- Lipinska, Jadwiga. (1993). La succession d'Hatchepsout. Les dossiers d'archéologie 187, 118–123.
- Lipińska, Jadwiga. (2000). Ancient Egyptian heart scarabs from the Louvre on loan in the National Museum in Warsaw. In Ciałowicz, Krzysztof M. and Janusz A. Ostrowski (eds), Les civilisations du bassin Méditerranéen: hommages à Joachim Śliwa, 129–136. Cracovie: Université Jagaellonne, Institut d'Archéologie.

== See also ==
- Polish Centre of Mediterranean Archaeology
- Temple of Thutmose III
- Kazimierz Michalowski
