= Mortuary temple of Thutmose III =

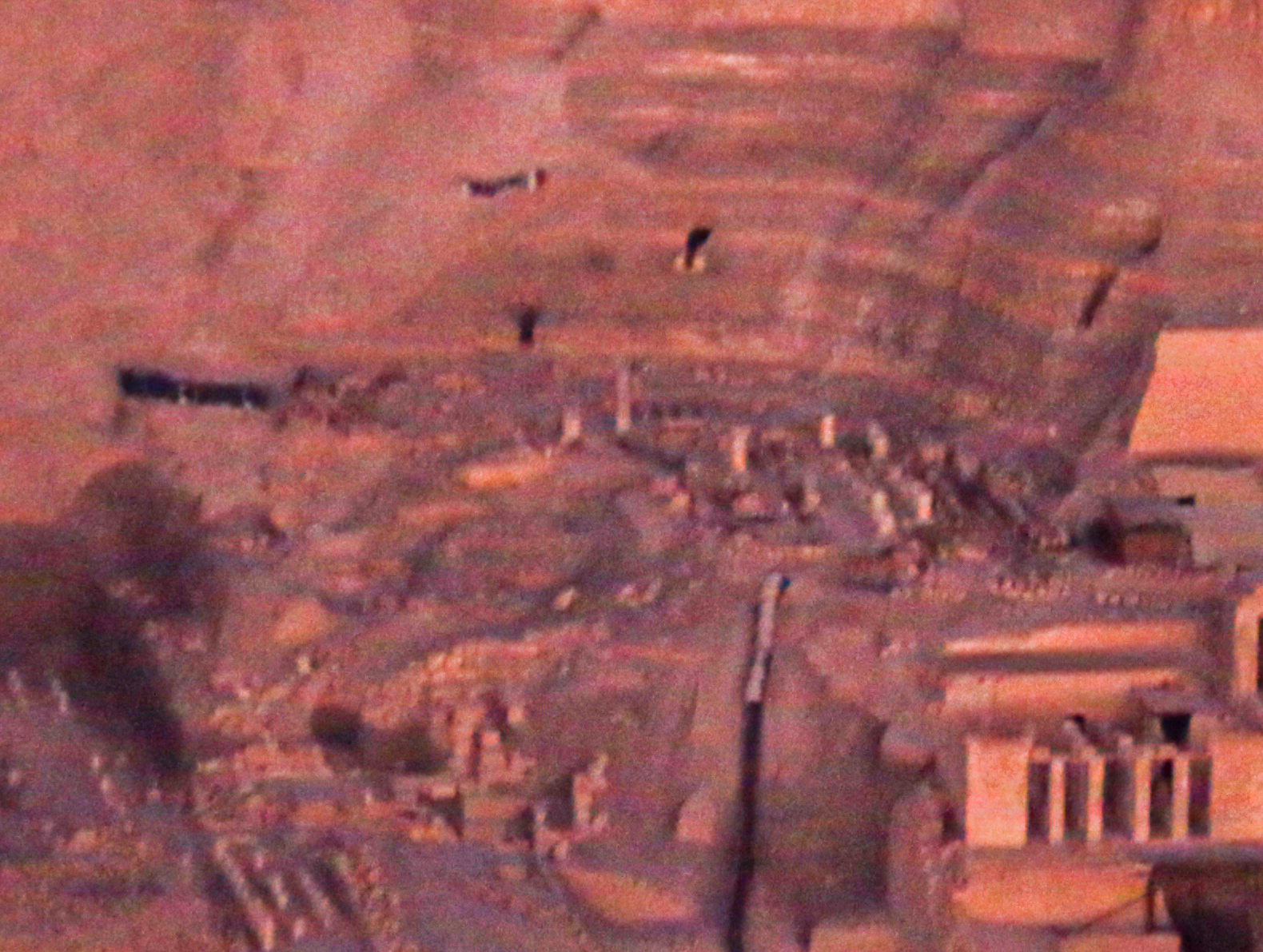
Remains of the Mortuary temple of Thutmose III

The mortuary temple of Thutmose III at Deir el-Bahari is a mortuary temple in the central part of the Deir el-Bahari Valley, built on a rocky platform and thus dominating over the earlier structures: the mortuary temple of Hatshepsut and the mortuary temple of Mentuhotep Nebhepetre of the Eleventh Dynasty. The temple was built in the last decade of Thutmose III’s rule, i.e., about 1435–1425 BC. It was destroyed, probably by an earthquake, at the beginning of the Twenty-first Dynasty. Fragments of walls covered with relief decoration were preserved. The building was presumably built on the neighboring terraced temples with pillared porticoes flanking the ramps leading to higher levels. It was called Djeser-akhet (“Holy of Horizon”). The remains of the temple of Thutmose III were uncovered in the years 1962–67. The excavations were initiated by Prof. Kazimierz Michałowski, then director of the Polish Centre of Mediterranean Archaeology of the University of Warsaw in Cairo (now the Polish Centre of Mediterranean Archaeology University of Warsaw). Work was resumed in 1978 to reconstruct the decoration of the temple.

== Architecture ==
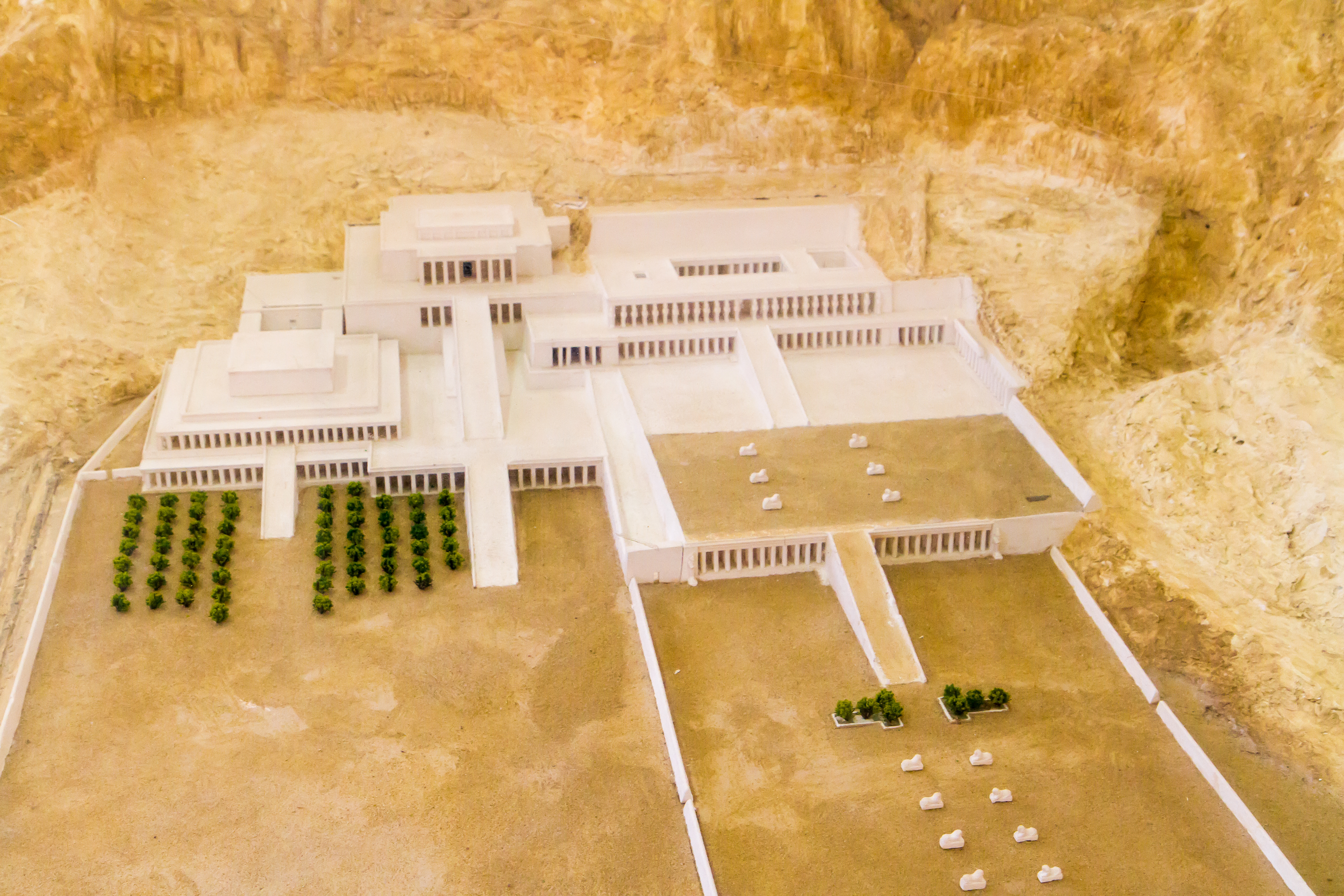
Model reconstruction of the Mortuary temple of Thutmose III (Djeser-akhet, center), in between the Mortuary temple of Mentuhotep II (Akh-sut Nebhepetre, left) and the Mortuary temple of Hatshepsut (Djeser-djeseru, right).

The temple was dedicated primarily to the god Amun (ah-mun), both in the form of Amun-Re and Amun-Kamutef, and probably played some role within the funerary cult of the Eighteenth Dynasty pharaoh Thutmose III. The king's actual funerary temple Henkhet-Ankh was located a short distance away, a little to the south of the entrance to Deir el Bahari and adjacent to the hill of Gurna. The temple probably played an important role within the "Beautiful Feast of the Valley", presumably being intended to receive the barque of the god during its travels and thereby supersede the Temple of Hatshepsut in one of its intended functions.

Small in size compared to the other complexes constructed earlier at Deir el-Bahari (some 40 metres N-S x 45 metres E-W), the temple is located on a small elevated terrace to the immediate north-west of the funerary temple of Mentuhotep II, and therefore positioned tightly between it and the temple of Hatshepsut immediately to the north-east. The larger part of the temple is positioned above the level of the upper terrace of the temple of Hatshepsut and rests on a roughly square platform partially cut from the rock and partially constructed of loose stones, supported by a stone revetment. No evidence exists for previous construction on this site.

Constructed of both sandstone and limestone, the temple's construction was supervised by the high official Rekhmire, vizier to Thutmose III, during the last decade of the king's reign. Documentary evidence - in the form of a series of limestone ostraka found at the site and published by W.C. Hayes [1960] - reveals that construction began in regnal year 43 and was probably not finished by regnal year 54 when Thutmose III died. The temple was likely then brought to completion by his successor Amenhotep II, in the early years of his reign.

Despite the clear existence of a causeway leading up to the site, the temple remained hidden from archaeologists until the 1960s as the result of an ancient rock fall from the high cliffs above - scholars have posited the temple's almost complete destruction by landslide towards the end of the 20th Dynasty, some 250 years after its completion. Thereafter, the site was apparently stripped of its sandstone building blocks for the construction of other projects. Completing the temple's devastation was the eventual collapse of the built-up portion of its supporting platform, causing the south-eastern corner of the temple to precipitate on to the Temple of Montuhotep immediately below. Relief fragments from the Djeser-Akhet were subsequently discovered amongst the rubble in the temple of Mentuhotep II by the Egypt Exploration Society excavators, conveniently foreshadowing the temple's re-discovery by the Poles several decades later.

== Conservation and reconstruction works ==
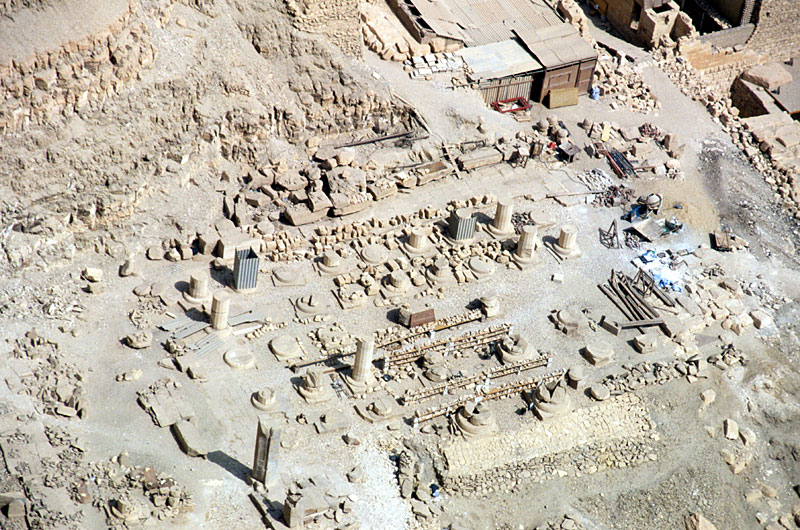
Aerial view of the remains of the Mortuary temple of Thutmose III

The reconstruction of the temple's layout was hindered by the large scale of destruction. However, the plan of the upper terrace could be reconstructed thanks to the outlines of walls visible on the remains of pavements and the partly-preserved column bases and shafts. Tens of thousands of relief fragments and wall inscriptions were excavated, as well as statuettes, steles of dignitaries of the New Kingdom, and sculptures depicting the ruler, including a 2-m-tall stone statue of Tuthmosis III. The work of the PCMA UW expedition, resumed in 1978 and continued to the present day in cooperation with National Museum in Warsaw and Egyptian Ministry of Antiquities, focuses on reconstructing the relief and architectural decoration and protecting the polychromies, as well as documenting them. Until 1996, Jadwiga Lipińska headed the team; since 2008, Monika Dolińska directs the work. The team is preparing a monograph on the temple reliefs to emphasize their uniqueness and the need for further conservation.

== See also ==
- Mortuary Temple of Amenhotep III
