= Deir el-Bahari =

Part of the Theban Necropolis in Luxor, Egypt

UNESCO World Heritage Site
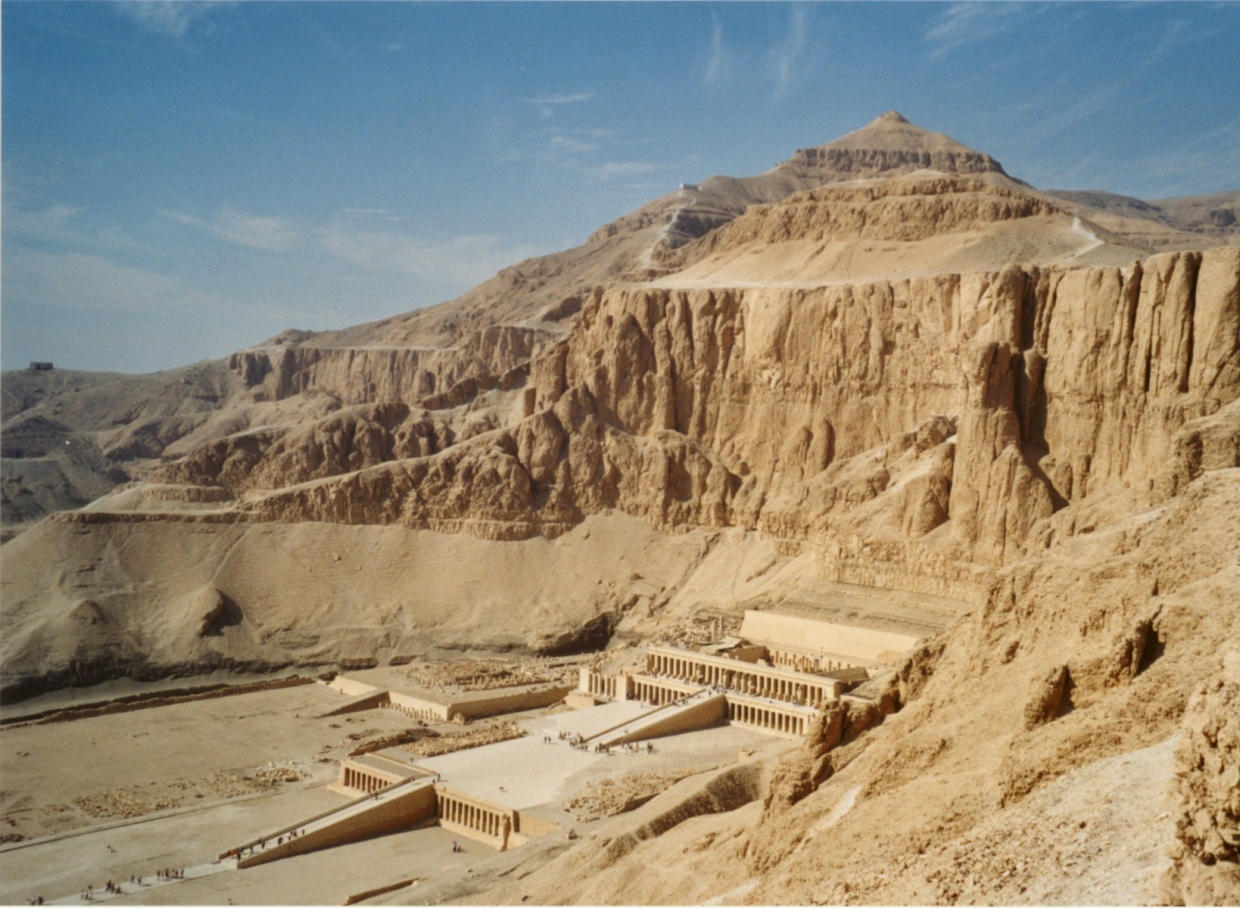

- Location within Egypt
- Location: Qurnah District, Luxor Governorate, Egypt
- Part of: Theban Necropolis
- Includes: Mortuary temple of Hatshepsut; Mortuary temple of Mentuhotep II; Mortuary Temple of Mentuhotep III; Mortuary temple of Thutmose III
- Criteria: Cultural: (i), (iii), (vi)
- Reference: 087-003
- Inscription: 1979 (3rd Session)
- Coordinates: 25°44′15″N 32°36′27″E

Deir el-Bahari or Dayr al-Bahri (Arabic: الدير البحري, romanized: al-Dayr al-Baḥrī, lit. 'the Northern [lit., "Seaward"] Monastery', Coptic: ⲡⲧⲟⲡⲟⲥ ⲛⲁⲡⲁ ⲫⲟⲓⲃⲁⲙⲙⲱⲛ, lit. 'the monastery of Apa Phoibammon', Ancient Egyptian: djeser-djeseru) is a complex of mortuary temples and tombs located on the west bank of the Nile, opposite the city of Luxor, Egypt. This is a part of the Theban Necropolis.

== History ==
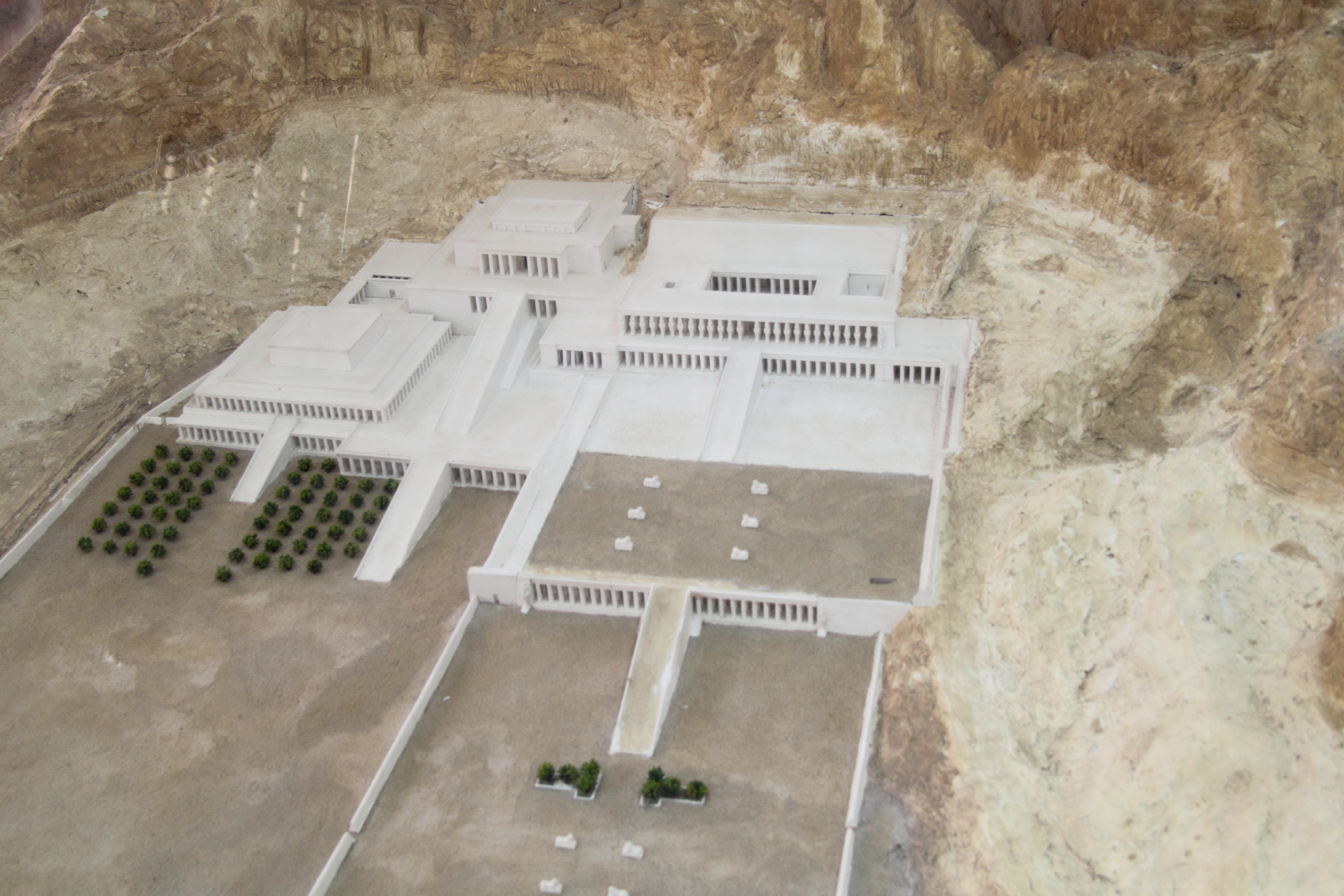
Model reconstruction of the Mortuary temple of Thutmose III (Djeser-akhet, center), in between the Mortuary temple of Mentuhotep II (Akh-sut Nebhepetre, left) and the Mortuary temple of Hatshepsut (Djeser-djeseru, right).

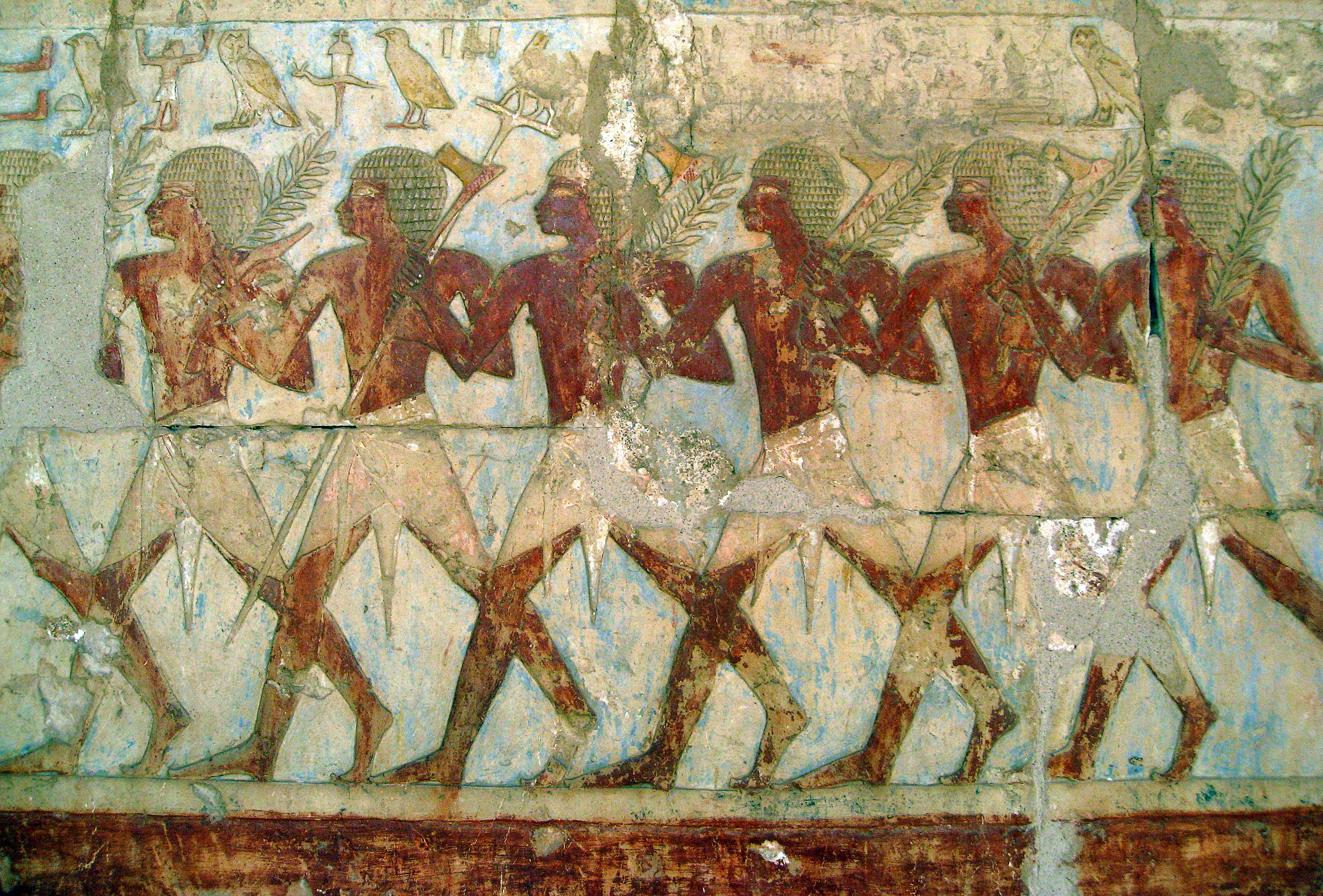
Egyptian soldiers from Hatshepsut's Year 9 expedition to the Land of Punt, as depicted on her temple at Deir el-Bahri

Deir el-Bahari, located on the west bank of the Nile at Thebes (modern Luxor) is a complex of mortuary temples and tombs that has served as a major religious center for over two millennia. Its history begins with the 11th Dynasty when Pharaoh Mentuhotep II (c.2061-2010 BCE) constructed his funerary temple here to commemorate the reunification of Egypt after the First Intermediate Period. Mentuhotep's terraced complex, integrating a royal tomb into a temple platform, pioneered the cliffside temple style later emulated by New Kingdom rulers.

Centuries later, the 18th Dynasty queen Hatshepsut erected her famous temple Djeser-Djeseru, designed by her architect Senenmut, directly beside Mentuhotep's complex. To make room for her temple, the Mortuary temple of Amenhotep I, which was constructed approximately 50 years earlier, was demolished. Richly decorated reliefs in Hatshepsut's temple celebrated her divine birth, commercial expedition to Punt, and association with Amun-Ra, cementing the temple's significance in state religion and royal propaganda.

Later, Thutmose III added a smaller temple, Djeser-Akhet, just above hers. By the Third Intermediate Period, Deir el-Bahari became a burial ground for priests and a hiding place for royal mummies such as those discovered in the DB320 cache in 1881.

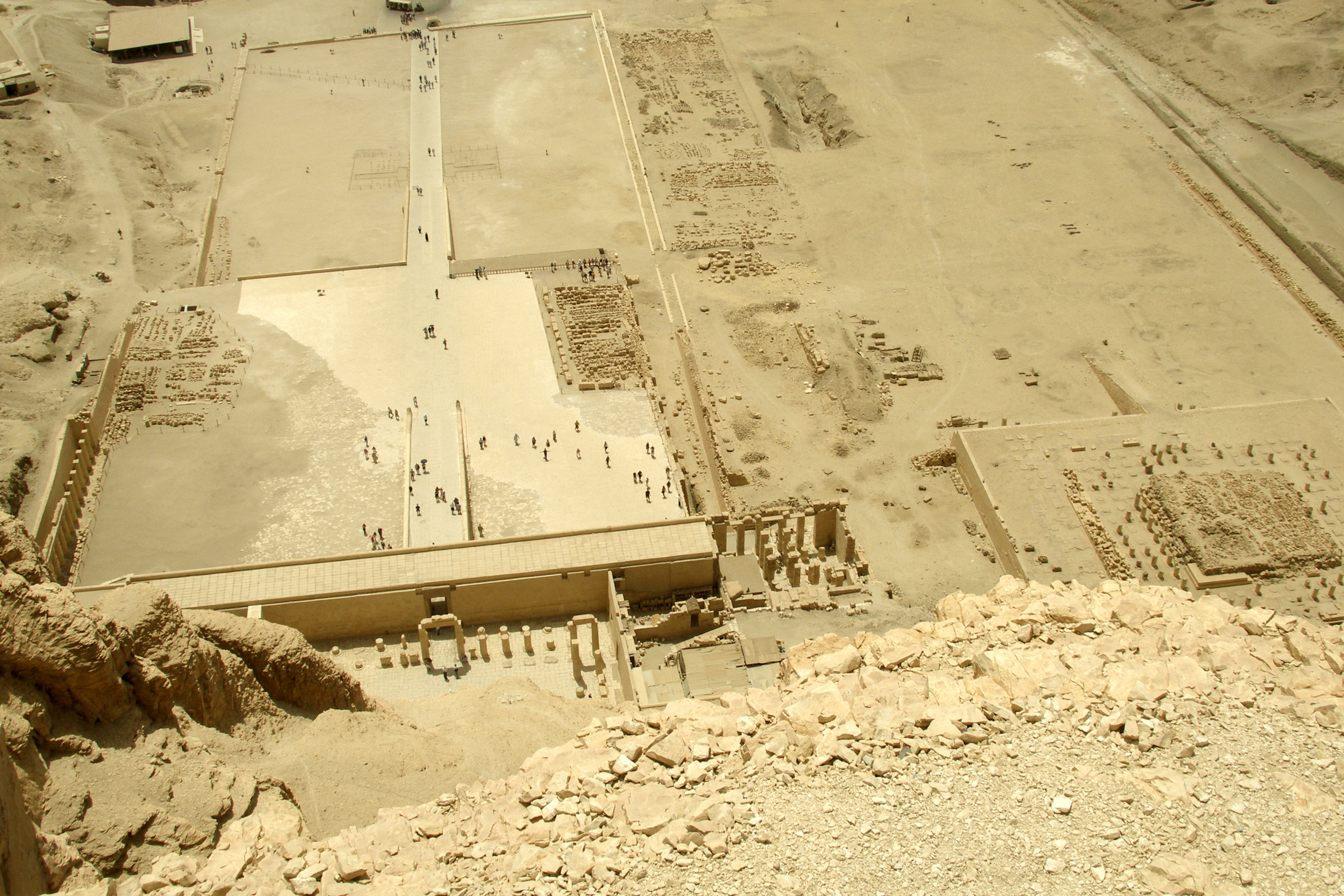
The three temples at Deir el Bahari from the top of the cliff behind them, part of Hatshepsut's temple on left, Tuthmosis III's temple in center, and Mentuhotep II's temple on right

Archaeological exploration in Deir el-Bahari began ramping up in the late 19th century. Édouard Naville's excavations from 1893 to 1906, sponsored by the Egypt Exploration Fund, revealed both Hatshepsut's temple and Mentuhotep II's complex. This was followed by Herbert Winlock's Metropolitan Museum of Art expeditions (1911-1931), which unearthed significant finds, including statues of Hatshepsut and Thutmose III and caches of ritual objects. The Polish Centre of Mediterranean Archaeology began extensive restoration work in the 1960s, stabilizing Hatshepsut's temple and recovering Thutmose III's largely destroyed shrine. Meanwhile, the site's significance as a necropolis continued into the Ptolemaic Period, when parts off Hatshepsut's temple were reused for cults of Imhotep and Amenhotep, Son of Hapu. Deir el-Bahari's rich history reflects its role as a sacred landscape where kings and priests were memorialized, divine legitimacy was protected, and Theban religious traditions flourished across changing dynasties.

== Associated deities ==
The purpose and significance of the structures and burials at Deir el-Bahari is closely related with the deities associated with Deir el-Bahari and the greater Theban Necropolis.

Hathor was a prominent goddess at Deir el-Bahari, venerated as a divine mother, protector, and patroness of the necropolis. The cliffs at Deir el-Bahari were sacred to Hathor before pharaonic construction, with Mentuhotep II likely honoring her cult when building there. His temple complex included shrines for royal women, priestesses of Hathor, underscoring the goddess’s significance. Hathor, regarded as “Lady of the West,” was often depicted as a cow emerging from the cliffs to welcome and nourish souls. Hatshepsut’s temple featured a chapel of Hathor with Hathor-headed columns and reliefs of offerings, highlighting Hathor’s enduring role in funerary rites and royal worship from the Middle to New Kingdom.

Anubis, the jackal-headed god of mummification, was revered as a guardian of tombs and guide of souls. Known as “He Who is Upon His Mountain” and “Foremost of the Westerners,” Though later eclipsed by Osiris in theology, Anubis remained essential as the patron of embalmers, and continued to be invoked as the guardian of tomb doors and the guide who conducts the "weighing of the heart" judgement for souls. At Deir el-Bahari, Hatshepsut’s temple featured a dedicated Anubis chapel on the north side of the middle terrace. Well-preserved reliefs show Anubis receiving offerings, reflecting his role in embalming rites and transition to the afterlife, with archaeological evidence confirming his importance across the Theban Necropolis.

Osiris, god of death and resurrection, became increasingly central to Theban funerary religion. Osiris is depicted as a mummified king wearing the Atef-crown and his mythology as the murdered and resurrected ruler made him the divine guarantor of rebirth for the deceased. The worship of Osiris at Deir el-Bahari can be traced to the Middle Kingdom when King Mentuhotep II incorporated Osirian symbolism into his mortuary cult. Osiris' cult was fully integrated into royal mortuary temples at Hatshepsut's Djeser-Djeseru, over twenty-five life size Osiride statues of the queen in Osiris form stood against the pillars of the upper terrace.

Amun-Ra, depicted wearing his plumed crown.

Meretseger, a cobra goddess local to the Theban Necropolis, personified the sacred peak overlooking the royal tombs and was called “She Who Loves Silence.” She guarded the necropolis, especially the Valley of the Kings, envisioned as a cobra atop the mountain watching for tomb robbers. Her cult is evidenced by votive stelae and artisans' graffiti, portraying her as both a punisher of wrongdoers and a merciful healer who forgave the penitent.

Amun ("The Hidden One") was the supreme god of Thebes, originally a local air deity who rose to national prominence as "Amun-Ra". He is typically depicted as a man with a double plumed crown, sometimes fused with the sun god Ra, reflecting his role as a creator and solar deity. Amun's worship at Deir el-Bahari began in the Middle Kingdom: the mortuary complex of Mentuhotep II was likely among the first west Theban temples designed to receive the barque of Amun during festivals. In the New Kingdom, Hatshepsut built the central sanctuary of her terraced temple for Amun-Ra, placing his cult chapel at the heart of Djeser-Djeseru. Inscriptions and reliefs from the site honor Amun's oracles and his role in legitimizing Hatshepsut's kingship, underscoring Amun's status as king of the gods and patron of pharaohs at the Theban Necropolis.

== Mortuary temple of Mentuhotep II ==
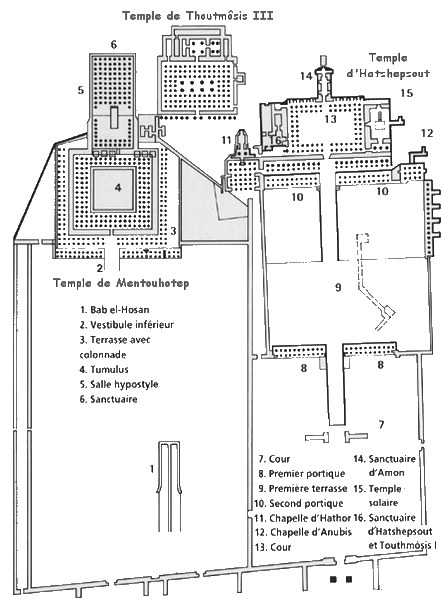
Site plan of Deir el-Bahari

Mentuhotep II, the Eleventh Dynasty king who reunited Egypt at the beginning of the Middle Kingdom, built a very unusual funerary complex. His mortuary temple was built on several levels in the great bay at Deir el-Bahari. It was approached by a 16-meter-wide (52-foot) causeway leading from a valley temple which no longer exists.

The mortuary temple itself consists of a forecourt and entrance gate, enclosed by walls on three sides, and a terrace on which stands a large square structure that may represent the primeval mound that arose from the waters of chaos. As the temple faces east, the structure is likely to be connected with the sun cult of Ra and the resurrection of the king.

From the eastern part of the forecourt, an opening called the Bab el-Hosan ('Gate of the Horseman') leads to an underground passage and an unfinished tomb or cenotaph containing a seated statue of the king. On the western side, tamarisk and sycamore trees were planted beside the ramp leading up to the terrace. At the back of the forecourt and terrace are colonnades decorated in relief with boat processions, hunts, and scenes showing the king's military achievements.

Statues of the Twelfth Dynasty king Senusret III were found here too.

The inner part of the temple was actually cut into the cliff and consists of a peristyle court, a hypostyle hall and an underground passage leading into the tomb itself. The cult of the dead king centred on the small shrine cut into the rear of the Hypostyle Hall.

The mastaba-like structure on the terrace is surrounded by a pillared ambulatory along the west wall, where the statue shrines and tombs of several royal wives and daughters were found. These royal princesses were the priestesses of Hathor, one of the main ancient Egyptian funerary deities. Although little remained of the king's own burial, six sarcophagi were retrieved from the tombs of the royal ladies (Ashayet, Henhenet, Kawit, Kemsit, Muyet and Sadhe). Each was formed of six slabs, held together at the corners by metal braces and carved in sunken relief. The sarcophagus of Queen Kawit, now in the Cairo Museum, is particularly fine.

The burial shaft and subsequent tunnel descend for 150 meters and end in a burial chamber 45 meters below the court. The chamber held a shrine, which once held the wooden coffin of Nebhepetre Mentuhotep. A great tree-lined court was reached by means of the processional causeway, leading up from the valley temple. Beneath the court, a deep shaft was cut which led to unfinished rooms believed to have been intended originally as the king's tomb. A wrapped image of the pharaoh was discovered in this area by Howard Carter. The temple complex also held six mortuary chapels and shaft tombs built for the pharaoh's wives and daughters.

Archaeological finds

One of the most significant finds at the site is a collection of statues of King Mentuhotep II in various forms. In the court of the temple a sandstone head of Mentuhotep II was found buried and is now housed in the Metropolitan Museum of Art. Several seated statues of Mentuhotep II were also found buried possibly indicating a ritual of buried objects Some of the recovered statues show the king wearing the Red Crown of Lower Egypt, emphasizing his role as a unifier in the First Intermediate Period. At each corner of the temple, foundation deposits were discovered consisting of small tablets made of wood, alabaster and bronze. The deposits contained pottery fragments, animal bones (likely from ritual sacrifices), and tools used in temple construction. These deposits suggest ritual offerings at the start of construction likely intended to sanctify the temple space.

Excavations revealed tree holes that indicated that sycamore fig trees were planted in the temple's forecourt. Some tree holes contained buried statues which is believed to link the practice of tree planting with ritual protection or regeneration beliefs. Flower beds and irrigation features were also found, indicating that the temple complex included gardens as part of its landscape.

Some walls of the temple showed evidence of Ptolemaic or later modifications, indicating that parts of the temple were reused in the Hellenistic and Roman periods. There were traces of later burials including a cemetery with poor burials stretching into the temple complex. The temple was likely partially dismantled and repurposed during the New Kingdom, possibly during the nearby construction of Hatshepsut's temple.

== Mortuary temple of Hatshepsut ==
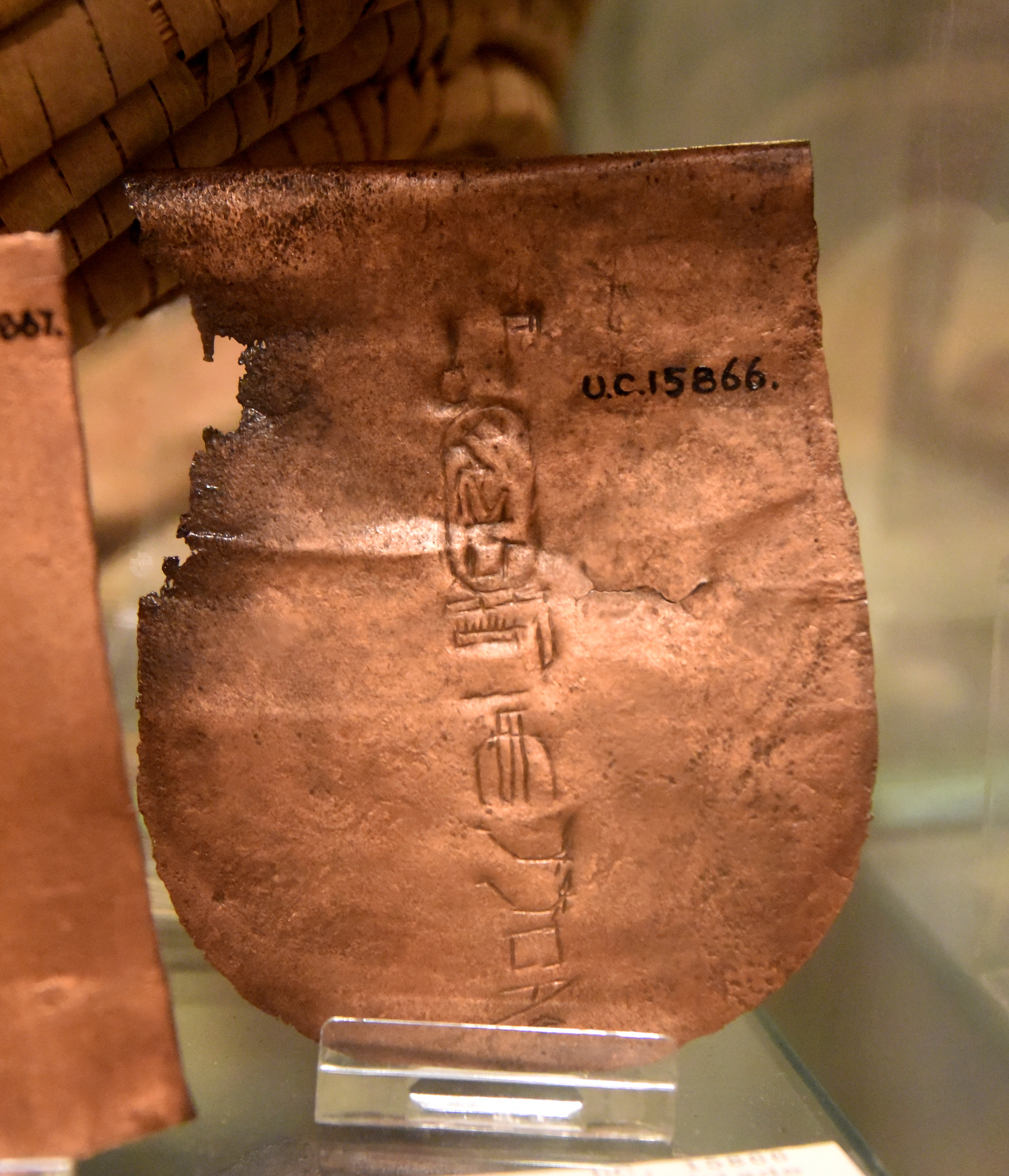
Copper plate, probably part of an axe-blade, showing cartouche of Hatshepsut. Foundation deposit in a small pit covered with a mat, Deir el-Bahri, Egypt. 18th Dynasty. The Petrie Museum, London.

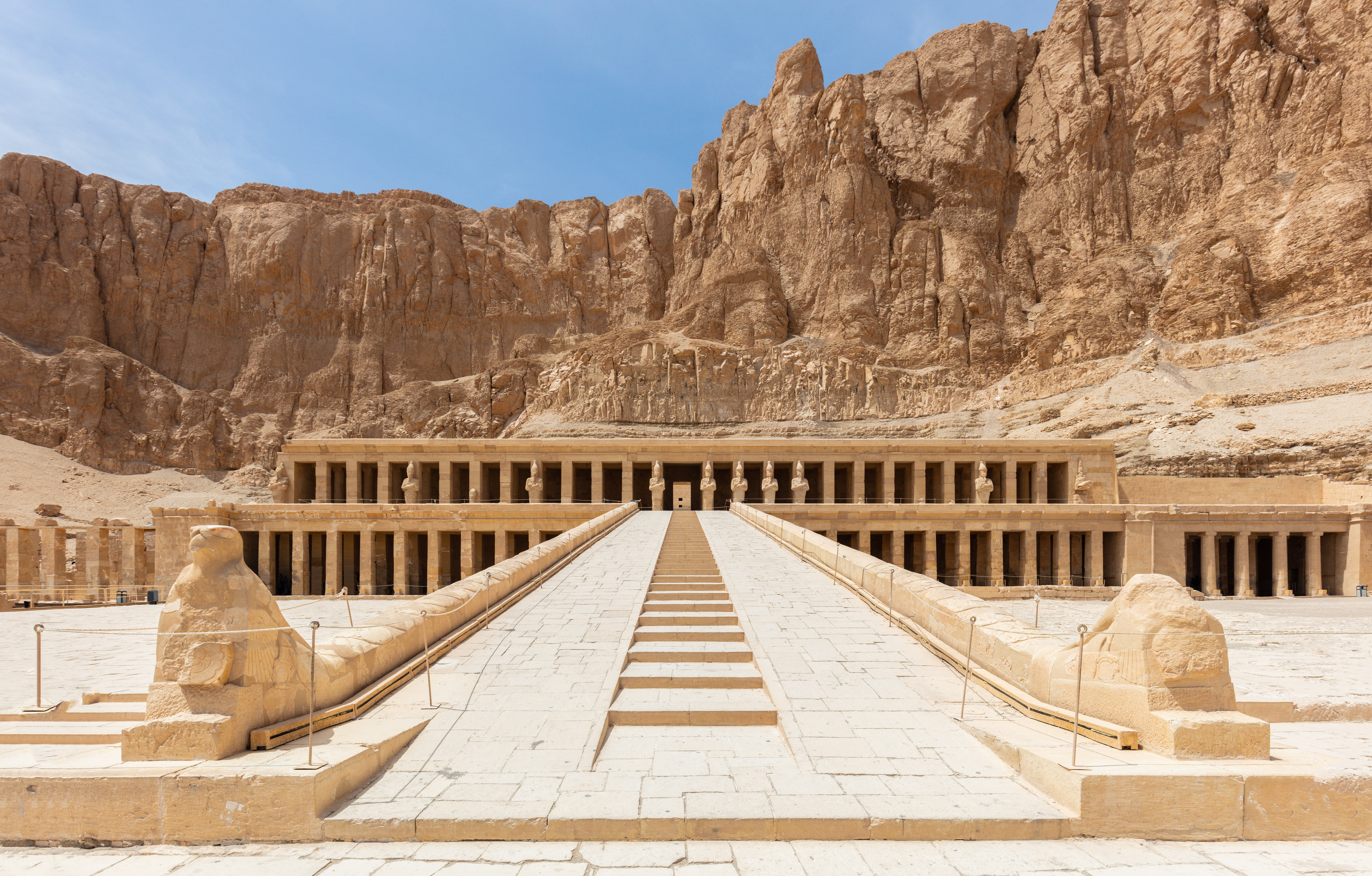
Djeser-Djeseru – Hatshepsut's temple, the focal point of the compound

The focal point of the Deir el-Bahari complex is the Djeser-Djeseru meaning "the Holy of Holies", the Mortuary Temple of Hatshepsut. It is a colonnaded structure, which was designed and implemented by Senenmut, royal steward and architect of Hatshepsut, to serve for her posthumous worship and to honor the glory of Amun.

Djeser-Djeseru sits atop a series of colonnaded terraces, reached by long ramps that once were graced with gardens. It is built into a cliff face that rises sharply above it, and is largely considered to be one of the "incomparable monuments of ancient Egypt". It is 97 feet (30 m) tall.

The unusual form of Hatshepsut's temple is explained by the choice of location, in the valley basin of Deir el-Bahari, surrounded by steep cliffs. It was here, in about 2050 BC, that Mentuhotep II, the founder of the Middle Kingdom, laid out his sloping, terrace-shaped mortuary temple. The pillared galleries at either side of the central ramp of the Djeser Djeseru correspond to the pillar positions on two successive levels of the Temple of Mentuhotep.

During the shift into the Ptolemaic (332-30 BCE) and Roman (30 BCE-4th Century CE) periods, the temple became a center for the cult of Amenhotep, son of Hapu and Imhotep. During these periods, the temple became a major cult site for these deified figures, known for their wisdom, healing and oracular powers. Greek inscriptions discovered in the temple provide insight into religious activities, economic functions, and visitors who frequented the site during these later periods.

Today the terraces of Deir el-Bahari only convey a faint impression of the original intentions of Senenmut. Most of the statue ornaments are missing – the statues of Osiris in front of the pillars of the upper colonnade, the sphinx avenues in front of the court, and the standing, sitting, and kneeling figures of Hatshepsut; some of these were destroyed in a posthumous condemnation of this pharaoh while others were rededicated to Thutmose III. The architecture of the temple has been considerably altered as a result of misguided reconstruction in the early twentieth century AD.

=== Architecture ===
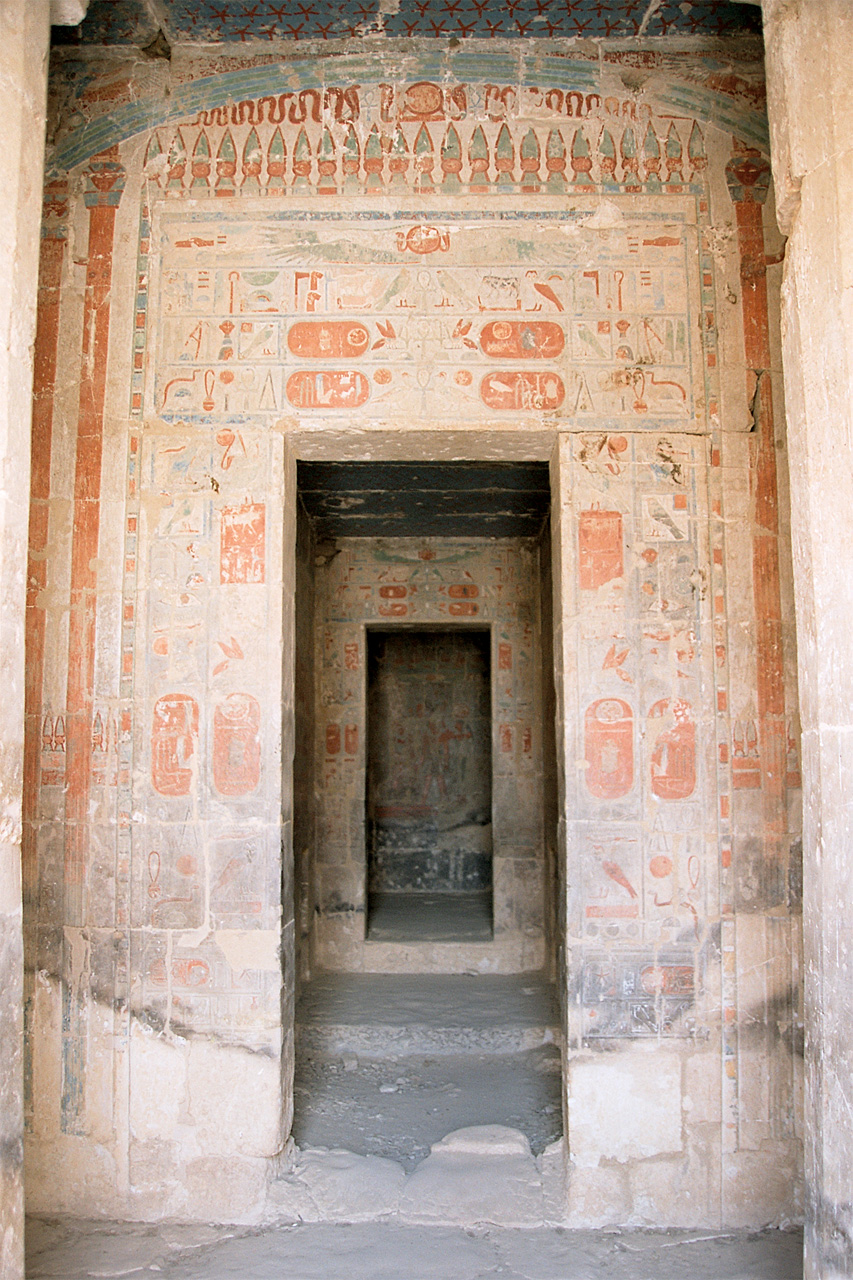
Sanctuary doorways

While Hatshepsut used Mentuhotep's temple as a model, the two structures are significantly different. Hatshepsut employed a lengthy colonnaded terrace that deviated from the centralized massing of Mentuhotep's model – an anomaly that may be caused by the decentralized location of her burial chamber.

There are three layered terraces reaching 97 feet (30 m) in height. Each 'story' is articulated by a double colonnade of square piers, with the exception of the northwest corner of the central terrace, which employs Proto-Doric columns to house the chapel. These terraces are connected by long ramps which were once surrounded by gardens. The layering of Hatshepsut's temple corresponds with the classical Theban form, employing pylon, courts, hypostyle hall, sun court, chapel, and sanctuary.

The relief sculpture within Hatshepsut's temple recites the tale of the divine birth of the pharaoh. The text and pictorial cycle also tell of an expedition to the Land of Punt, an exotic country on the Red Sea coast.

On either side of the entrance to the sanctuary (shown right) are painted pillars with images of Hathor as the capitals. Just under the roof is an image of Wadjet, displayed as a bilateral solar symbol, flanked by two other long serpents.

The temple includes an image, shown to the right, of Hatshepsut depicted as male pharaoh giving offerings to Horus, and to their left, an animal skin wound around a tall staff that is a symbol of the god Osiris.

While the statues and ornamentation have since been stolen or destroyed, the temple once was home to two statues of Osiris, a long avenue lined by sphinxes, as well as many sculptures of pharaoh Hatshepsut in different attitudes – standing, sitting, or kneeling.

=== Conservation efforts ===
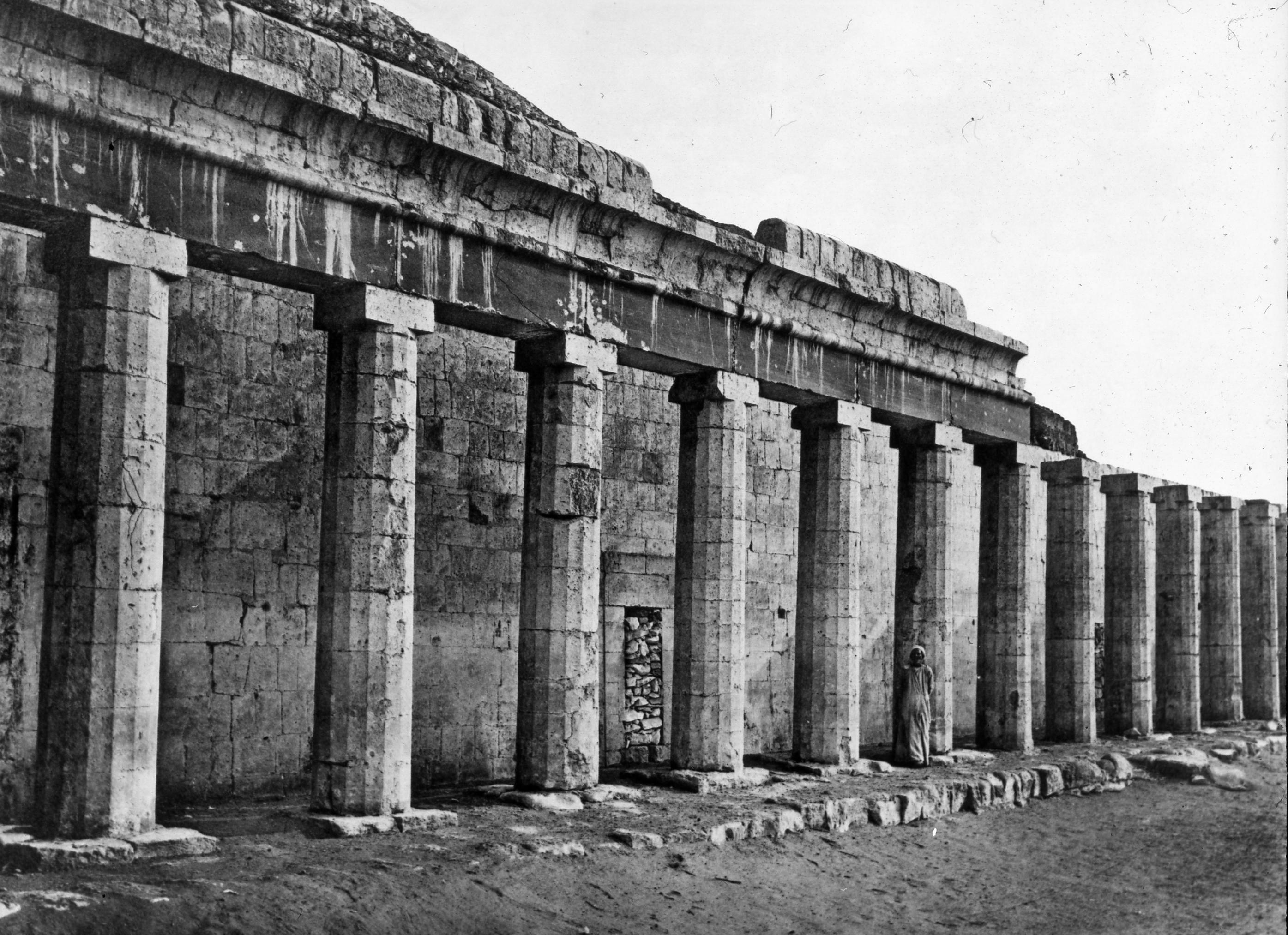
The unfinished colonnade on the second level of Hatshepsut's Temple

Since the early 20th century, continuous archaeological and conservation work has been undertaken to preserve the Temple of Hatshepsut. As part of the UNESCO World Heritage site of Thebes the temple has been a focal point of archaeological and conservation efforts for over a century.

The conservation of the Temple of Hatshepsut at Deir el-Bahari has been a continuous effort, addressing structural instability, environmental damage, and past restoration methods. Large-scale excavation and conservation work began in the 19th century with Auguste Mariette, followed by Édouard Naville, who conducted documentation and reconstruction efforts between 1891 and 1908. In the early 20th century, Herbert Winlock and the Metropolitan Museum of Art focused on stabilizing the temple’s walls and reinforcing weakened structures. Later, Émile Baraize of the French Antiquities Service carried out additional reconstructions using stone, concrete, and gypsum, though records of these interventions were limited.

Since the 1960s, Polish archaeological missions have led major conservation projects, particularly on the festival courtyard, coronation portico, and royal cult complex. The Hatshepsut Chapel, located on the temple's upper terrace has been a primary focus due to its archaeological significance and vulnerability. In the 2000s, modern technologies such as 3D scanning and damage mapping were introduced to assess structural weaknesses, revealing cracks, missing sections, and displaced blocks from earlier restorations. Conservation teams reinforced walls, stabilized the foundations, and analyzed ancient mortars to develop improved preservation methods.

A significant discovery in 2013 was a tomb beneath the Hatshepsut Chapel containing burials from the 23rd-25th Dynasties, which required additional stabilization measures. Structural reinforcements were implemented, including the installation of a protective manhole for controlled access. Conservationists have also focused on preserving stone surfaces and polychrome decorations affected by environmental exposure. Ongoing research continues to refine preservation strategies with long-term plans integrating climate impact assessments, stone conservation, and controlled reconstruction to maintain the structural and historical integrity of the temple.

== Mortuary temple of Thutmose III ==
The Mortuary Temple of Thutmose III, also called Djeser-Akhet (Holy of the Horizon), was discovered in 1961; the mortuary temple of Thutmose III was built in at about 1435-1425 BC, late in Thutmose's reign. It overlooks other earlier structures present on the site, such as the temples of Hatshepsut and Mentuhotep Nebhepetre. Built on a steep, artificially leveled terrace, the temple features a basilica-style hypostyle hall with clerestory windows, a rare architectural innovation that foreshadowed the later hypostyle halls of the Ramesside Period. The temple complex was primarily dedicated to Amun-Ra, reflecting the King's close association with the Theban-state god. A key highlight is the Hathor shrine, discovered in 1906, which housed a statue of hathor as a cow protecting the king. The temple's reliefs, recovered in thousands of fragments, show Thutmose III in vibrant polychrome scenes performing rituals, offering to gods, and participating in the Beautiful Festival of the Valley.

Rediscovered in 1962 by a Polish-Egyptian mission, the site revealed column bases, a red granite doorway, and vast amounts of painted limestone and sandstone reliefs. Excavations also uncovered statues of Thutmose III, foundation deposits beneath the Hathor chapel containing botanical offerings, faience amulets, and pottery The temple was heavily damaged by an 11th century BCE earthquake and subsequent stone-robbing, leaving only foundations and scattered architectural elements. Despite its ruinous state, the temple's design closely mirrors Hatshepsut's nearby temple while innovating with its elevated basilica-style hall. Over time the site became a focus for the worship of Hathor during the Third Intermediate Period, as indicated by later votive offerings. Today the reconstructed reliefs and artifacts from Djeser-Akhet contribute significantly to the understanding of royal cult practices and 18th Dynasty temple architecture.

There are ongoing conservation efforts including a reconstruction of the temple's layout which have been made difficult by the severity of the destruction in some areas of the temple. Some progress, however, has been made on the reconstruction of the layout of the upper terrace.

== Royal and non-royal tombs ==
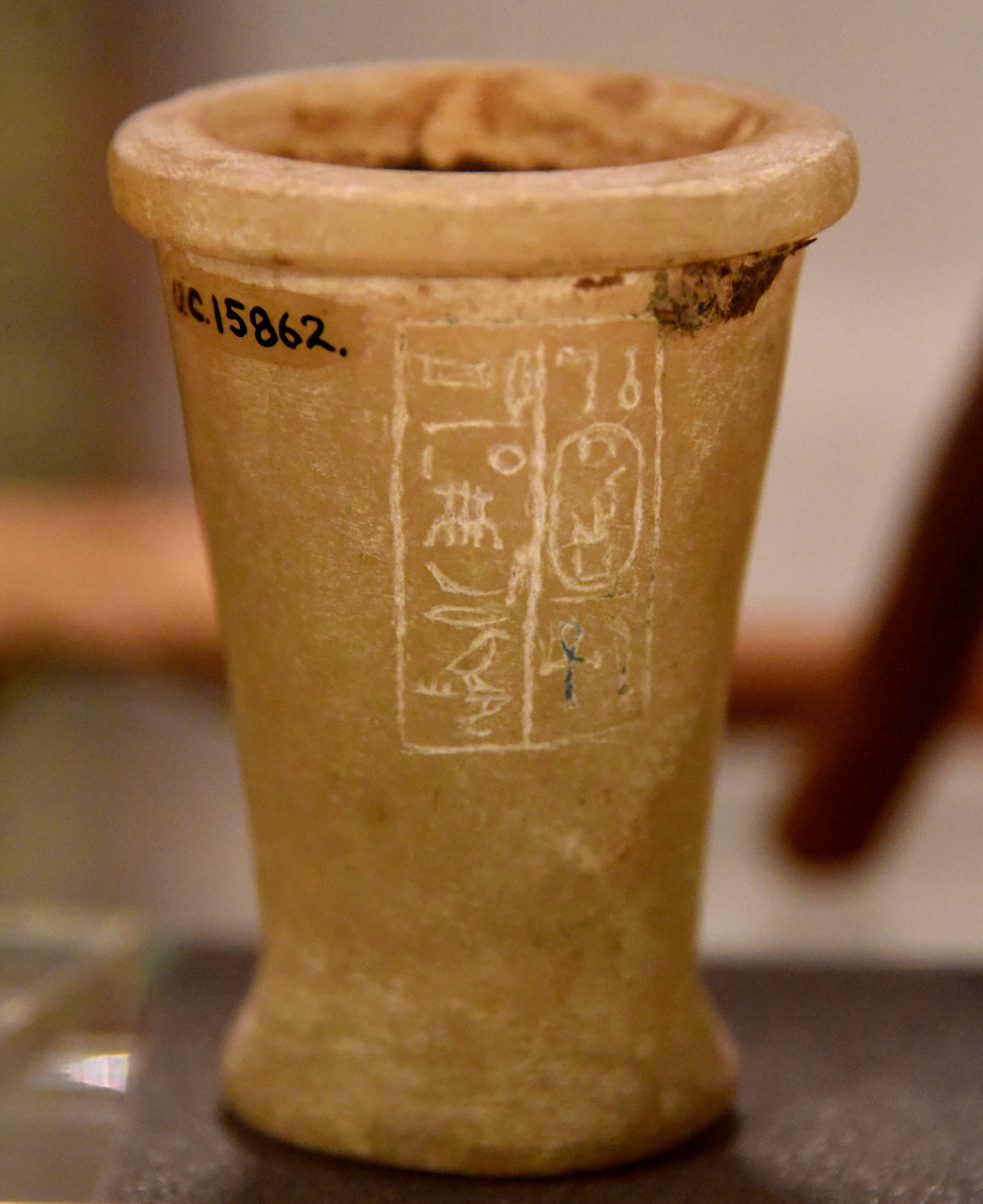
Jar bearing the cartouche of Hatshepsut. Filled in with cedar resin. Calcite, unfinished. Foundation deposit. 18th Dynasty. From Deir el-Bahari, Egypt. The Petrie Museum of Egyptian Archaeology, London.

A tomb (TT320) in a hidden recess in the cliffs to the south of the temples contained a cache of forty royal mummies, moved there from the Valley of the Kings. The bodies had been placed there by Twenty-first Dynasty priests, most likely to prevent further desecration and looting. The tomb was probably originally built for priests of the 21st Dynasty, most likely the family of Pinedjem II. In the cache were found the mummies of Ahmose I, along with the Eighteenth and Nineteenth dynasty leaders Amenhotep I, Thutmose I, Thutmose II, Thutmose III, Ramesses I, Seti I, Ramesses II, and Ramesses IX. In a separate room were found Twenty-first dynasty High Priests and pharaohs Pinedjem I, Pinedjem II, and Siamun. The discovery of the mummies cache is depicted in the Egyptian movie The Night of Counting the Years (1969).

In 1891, a larger cache of 153 reburied mummies of the priests themselves also were found in a tomb at the site, known today as Bab el-Gasus 'Gate of the Priests' (also referred to as the "Priestly Cache" or "Second Cache").

Private tombs dating from the Middle Kingdom through the Ptolemaic period are also situated here. There are two most notable private tombs at Deir el-Bahari. The first is that of Meketre (TT280), which contained many painted wooden funerary models from the Middle Kingdom and the first recorded human-headed canopic jar.

The second, the "secret" tomb of Senenmut – the architect and steward who oversaw the construction of the temple for Hatshepsut – was begun in the complex also. Senenmut's tomb was vandalized in antiquity, but some of the relief artwork is still intact. It was meant to be a very large tomb and its corridors are over 100 yards (91 m) long. However, it was never finished and Senenmut was not interred there. He has another tomb, not far from Deir el-Bahari, where his body may have been placed, but it, too, was vandalized and robbed.

A large area of non-royal tombs in this vicinity is called Sheikh Abd el-Qurna.

== Stone chest ==
In March 2020 archeologists from Warsaw University's Institute of Archaeology, led by Andrzej Niwiński, discovered a treasure chest and a wooden box dating back 3,500 years in the Egyptian site of Deir el-Bahari.

The stone chest contained several items, with all of them covered with linen canvas. Three bundles of flax were found during the excavation. A goose skeleton, sacrificed for religious purposes, was found inside one of them. The second one included goose eggs. It is believed that what the third bundle contained was an ibis egg, which had a symbolic meaning for the ancient Egyptians. In addition, a little wooden trinket box was discovered inside the bundle; the box is believed to contain the name Pharaoh Thutmose II.

According to the Andrzej Niwiński, "The chest itself is about 40 cm long, with a slight smaller height. It was perfectly camouflaged, looked like an ordinary stone block. Only after a closer look did it turn out to be a chest."

== Contemporary issues and tourism ==
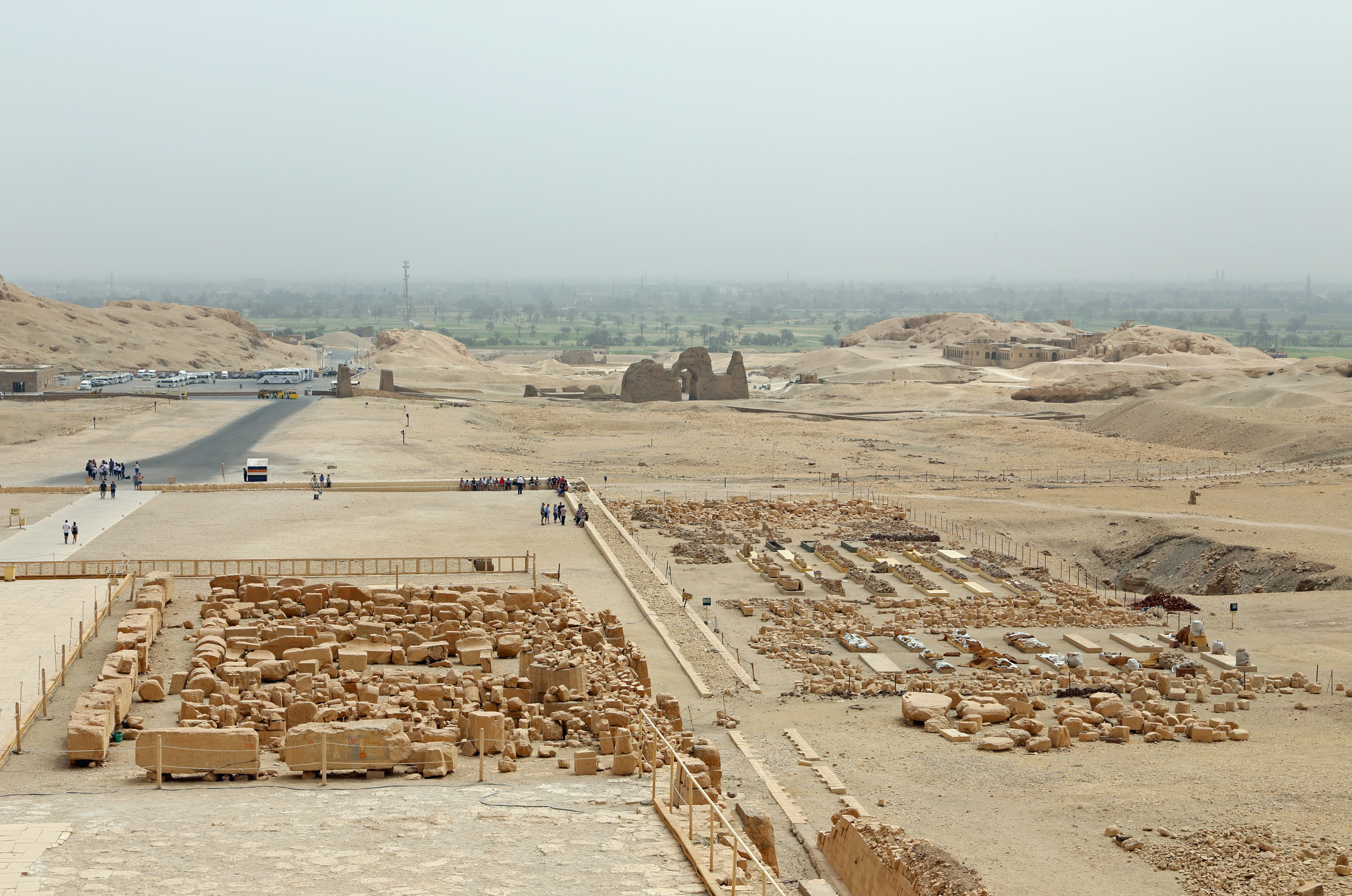
General view of Deir el-Bahari from the Temple of Hatshepsut towards the Nile valley

Today, Deir el-Bahari is one of Egypt's most visited archaeological sites and part of the UNESCO World Heritage listing "Ancient Thebes with its Necropolis". Its restored terraces, particularly Hatshepsut's temple, attract thousands of tourists annually, drawn by the site's architectural beauty and historical significance. The Polish-Egyptian Conservation Project has been instrumental in transforming the once-ruined site into a partially reconstructed monument with accessible terraces, restored statues, and visitor pathways. However, parts of the site such as Mentuhotep II's temple remain off-limits due to their fragile condition. Modern infrastructure including interpretive signage and a visitor center, aims to balance public access with heritage preservation, while the site continues to be a focal point of scholarly research and conservation.

Deir el-Bahari has also been a focal point for modern security concerns. On November 17, 1997, the site was the scene of the Luxor Massacre, when militants killed over 60 tourists at Hatshepsut's temple, causing a severe blow to Egypt's tourism industry. Since then, the Egyptian government has implemented extensive security measures including armed Tourist Police, metal detectors and surveillance systems. While tourism has recovered in the years since the attack, the event remains a stark reminder of the vulnerability of cultural heritage sites to political violence. Despite this, Deir el-Bahari continues to thrive as a key destination within the Luxor region's tourism economy, representing both a testament to Egypt's enduring legacy and a symbol of resilience in the face of modern threats.

== Art ==
Kaska, Dance of War is a painting by Shefa Salem that depicts Libyan soldiers performing a kaska dance of the Timihu people, which was first recorded 5000 years ago at Deir El-Bahari.

== Gallery ==
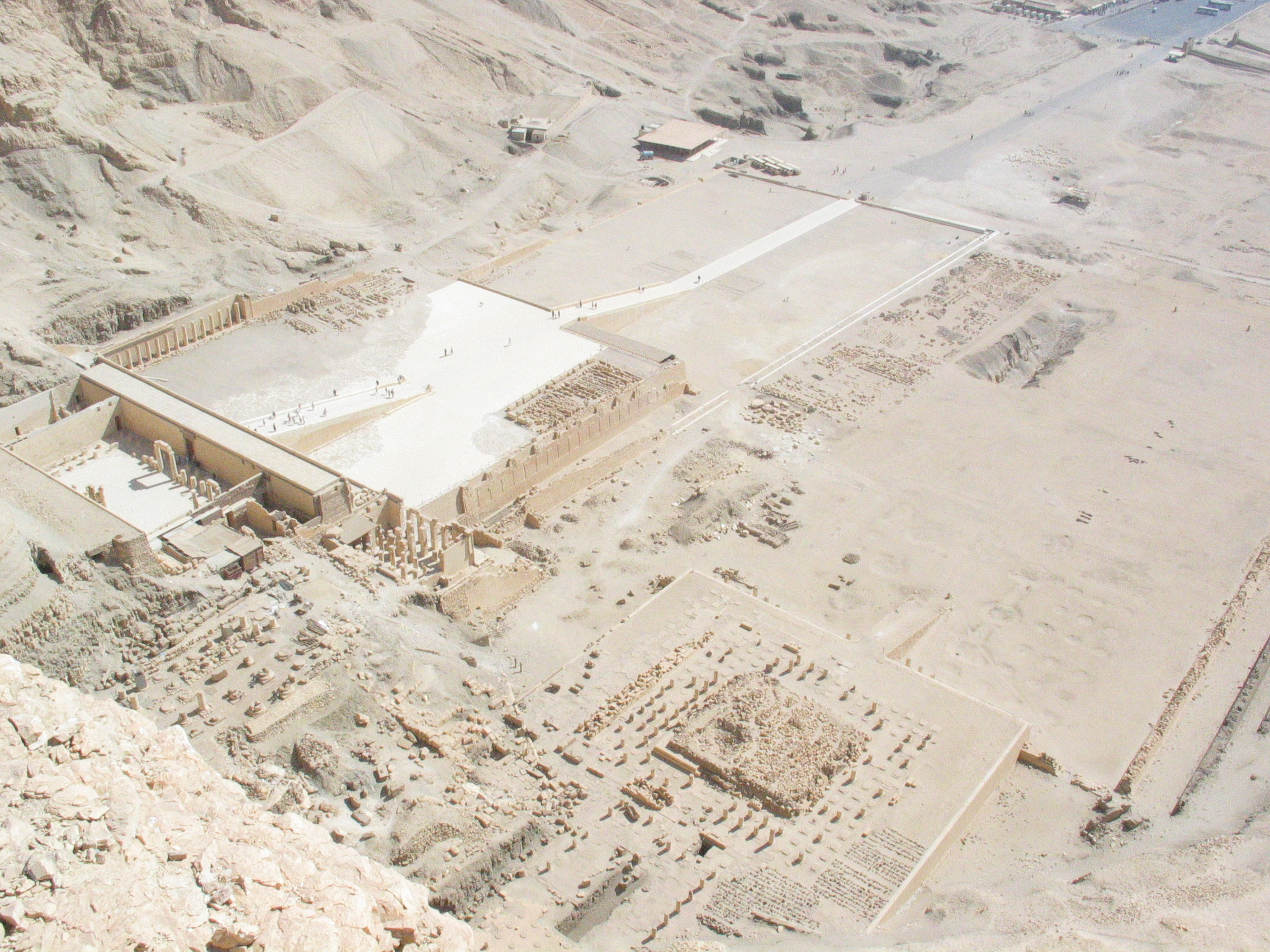
The three temples at Deir el Bahari from the top of the cliff behind them, part of Hatshepsut's temple on left, Tuthmosis III's temple in center, and Mentuhotep II's temple on right

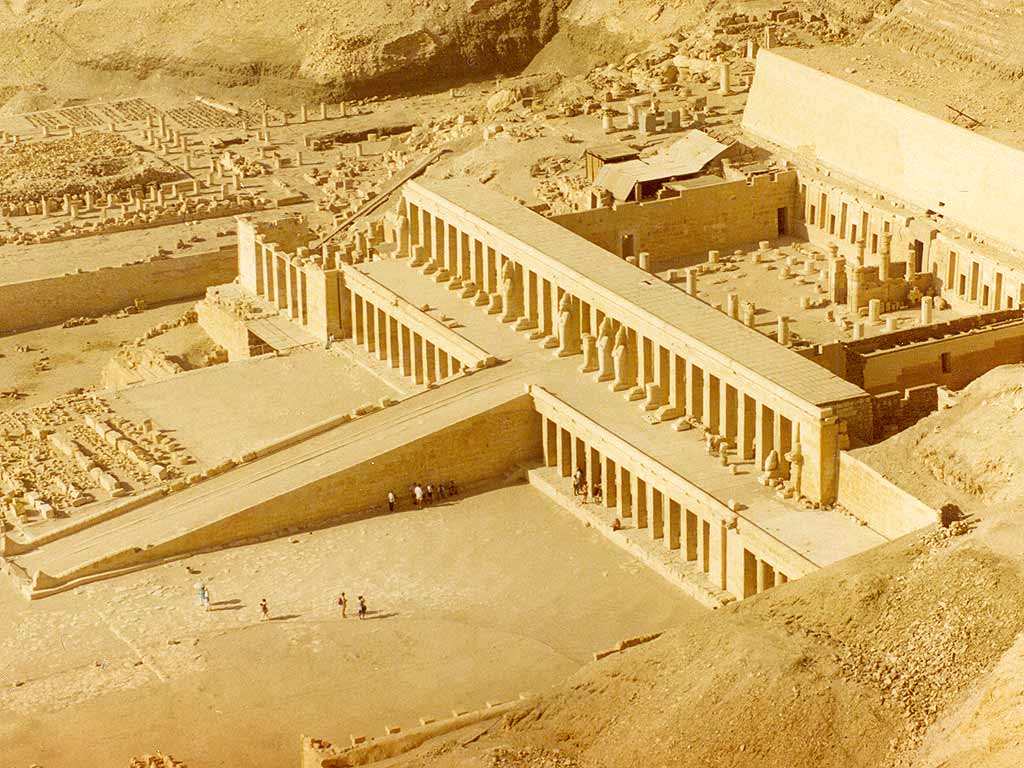
Hatshepsut's temple

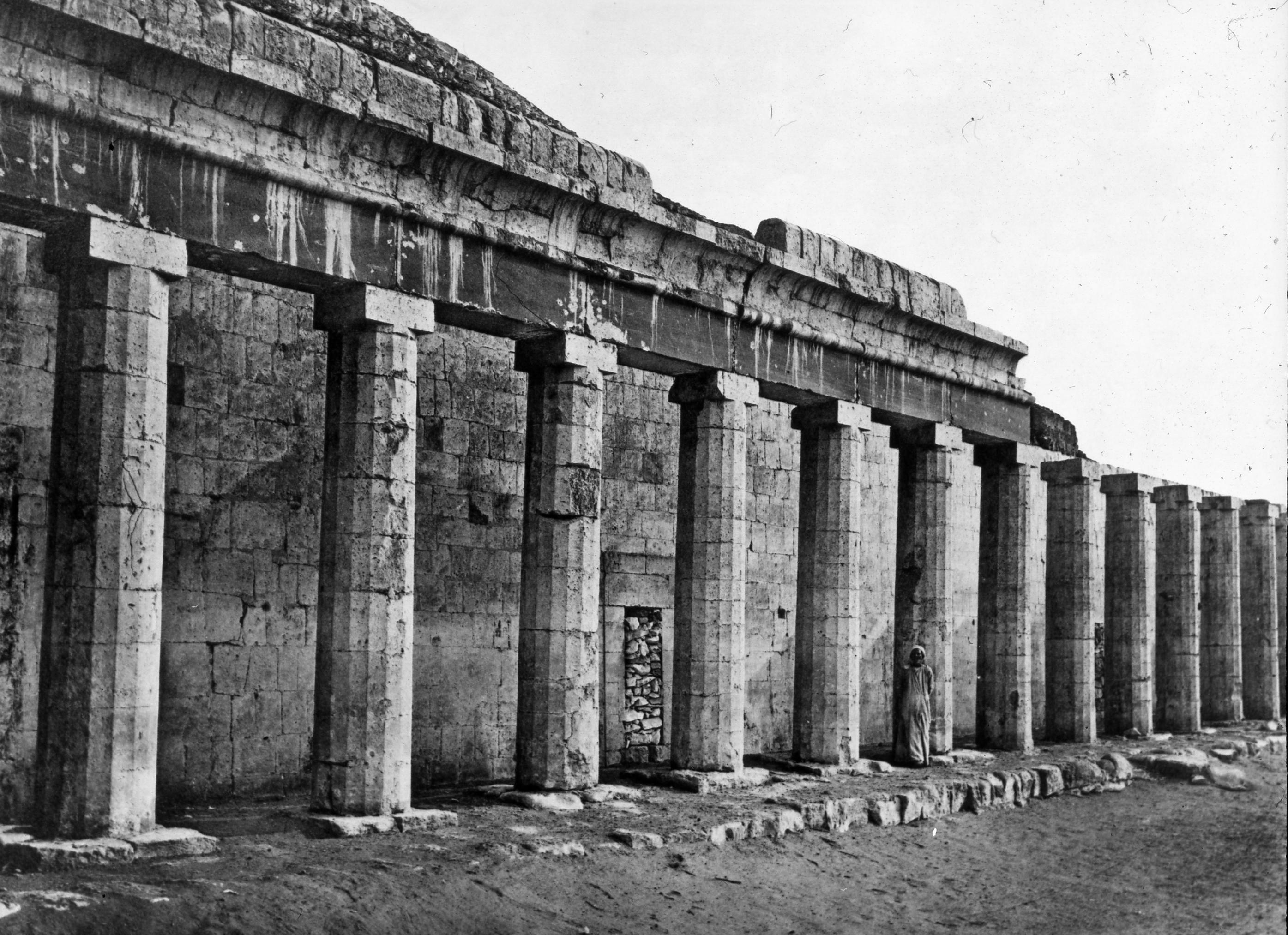
The unfinished colonnade on the second level of Hatshepsut's Temple

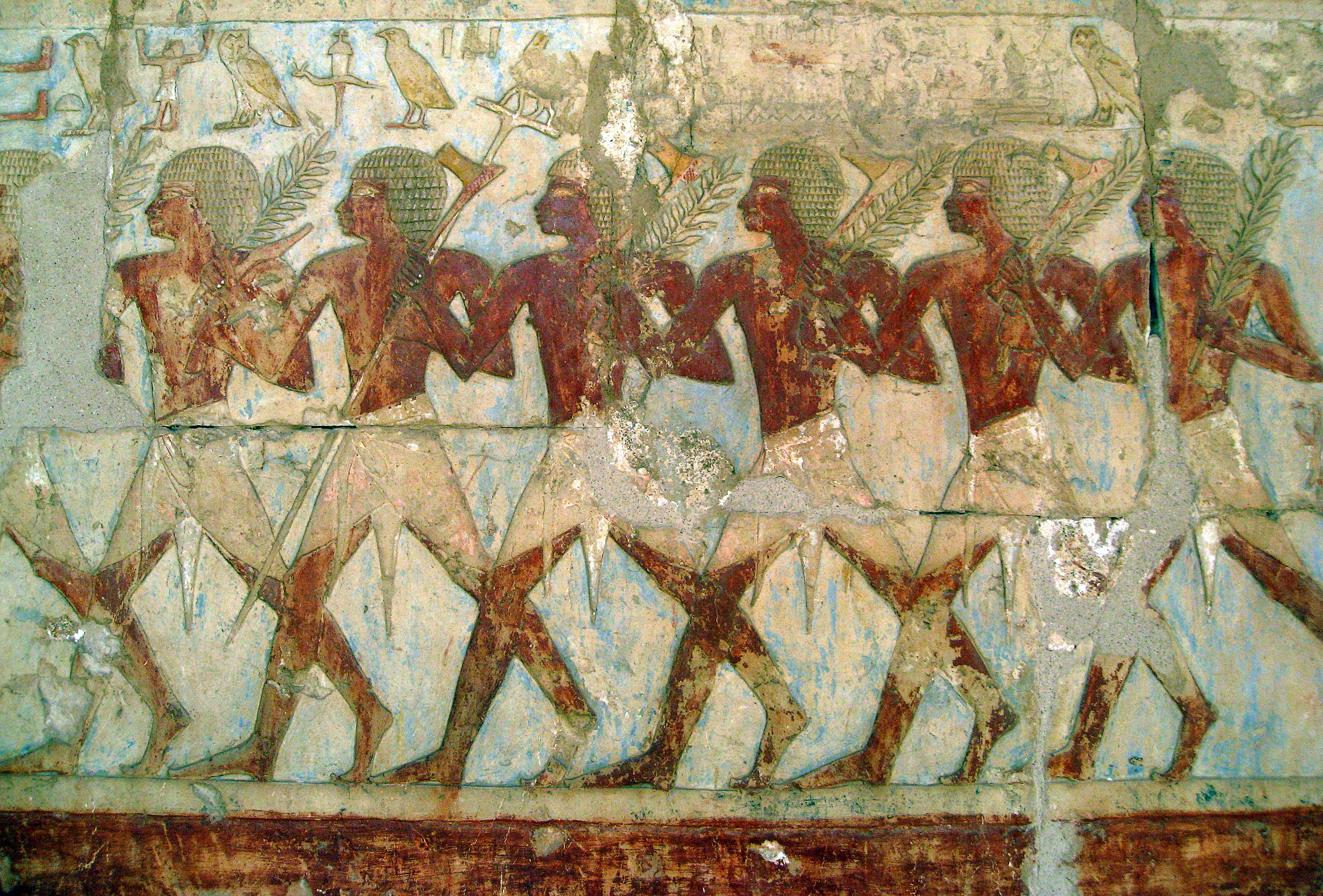
Egyptian soldiers from Hatshepsut's Year 9 expedition to the Land of Punt, as depicted on her temple at Deir el-Bahri

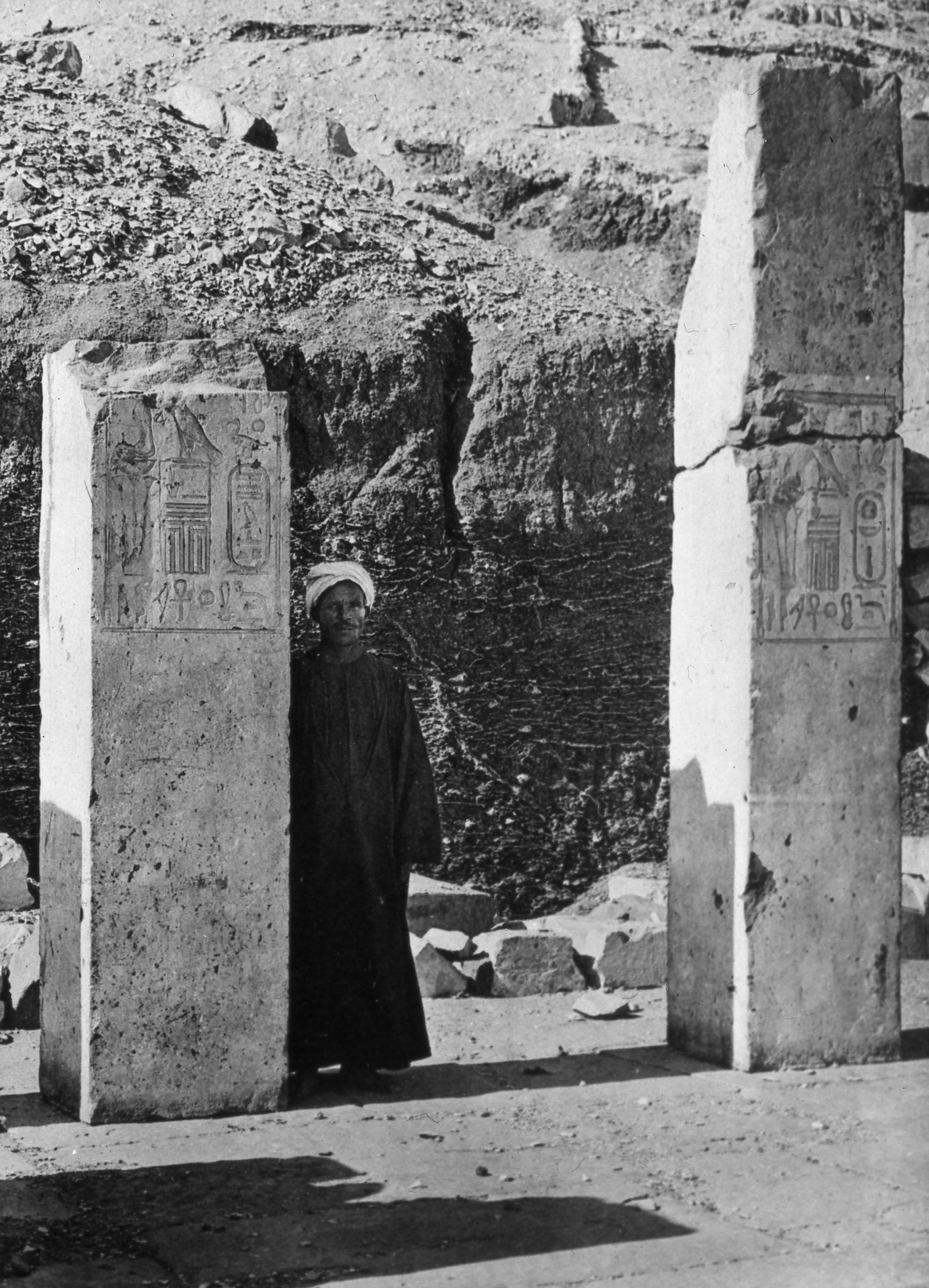
Deir-El-Bahari

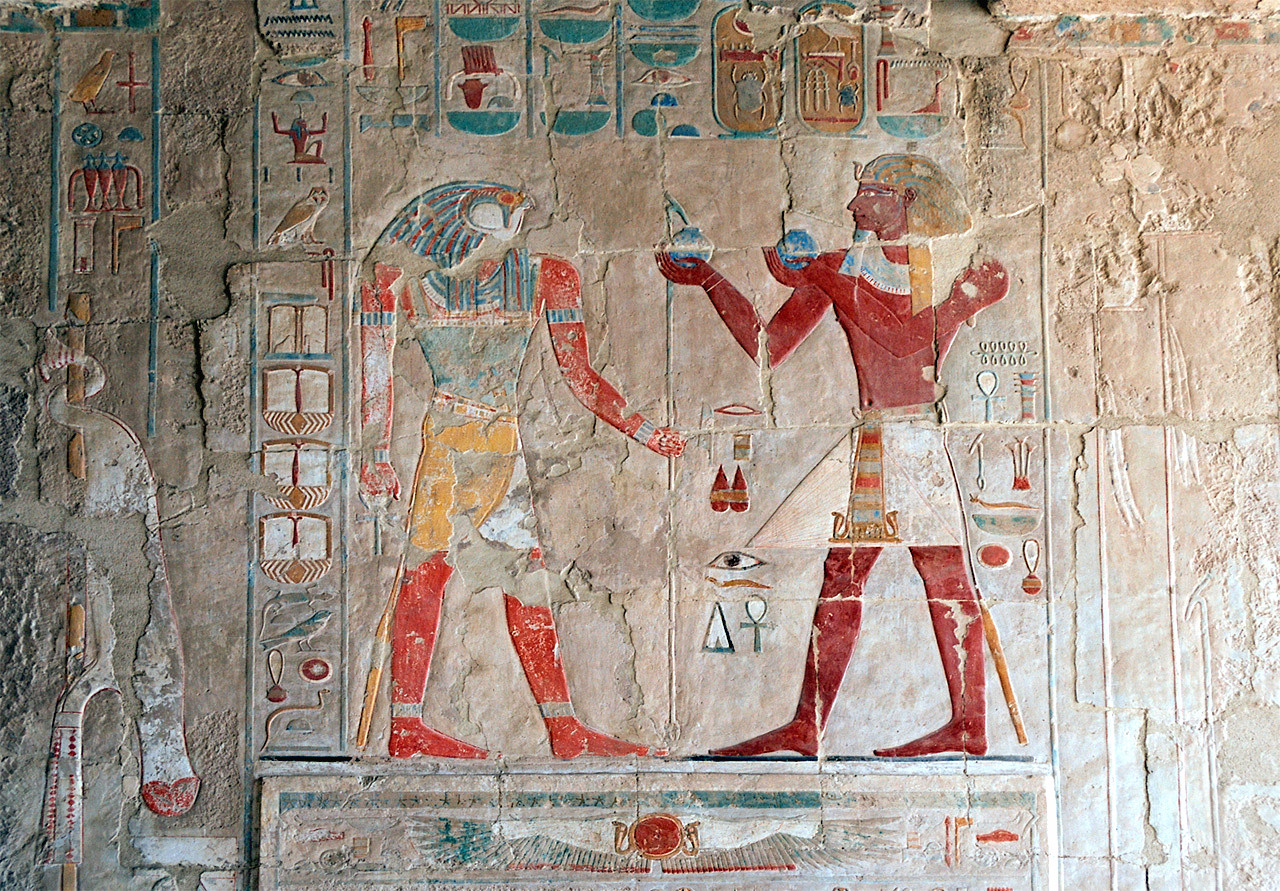
Hieroglyphic decorations

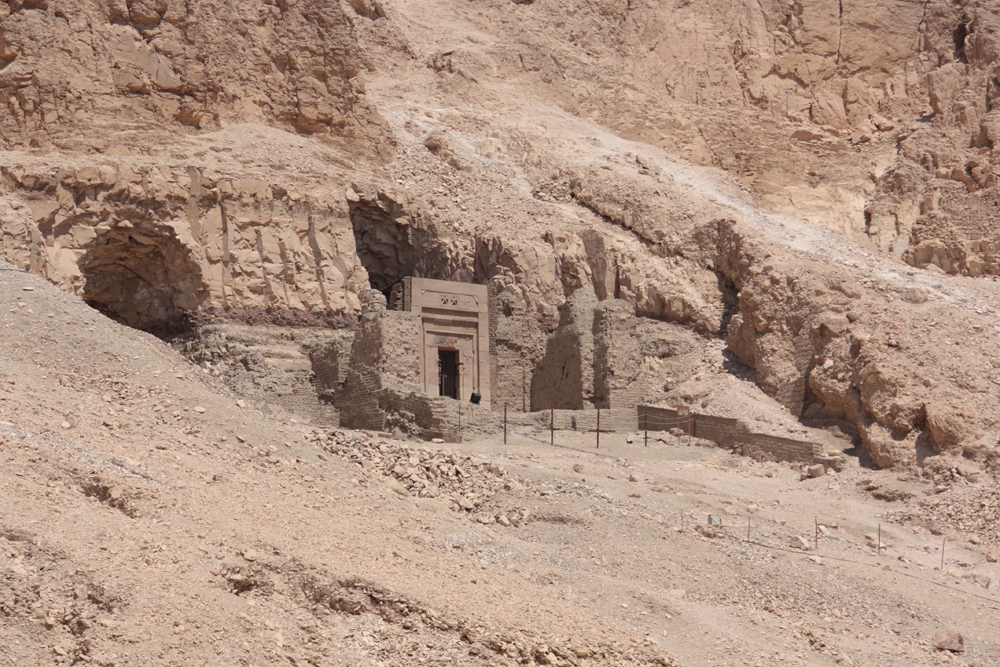
TT 353 of Sen-en-Mut (Senenmut tomb) – a hypogeum built by the order of Sen-en-Mut, 97.36 m long and 41.93 m deep

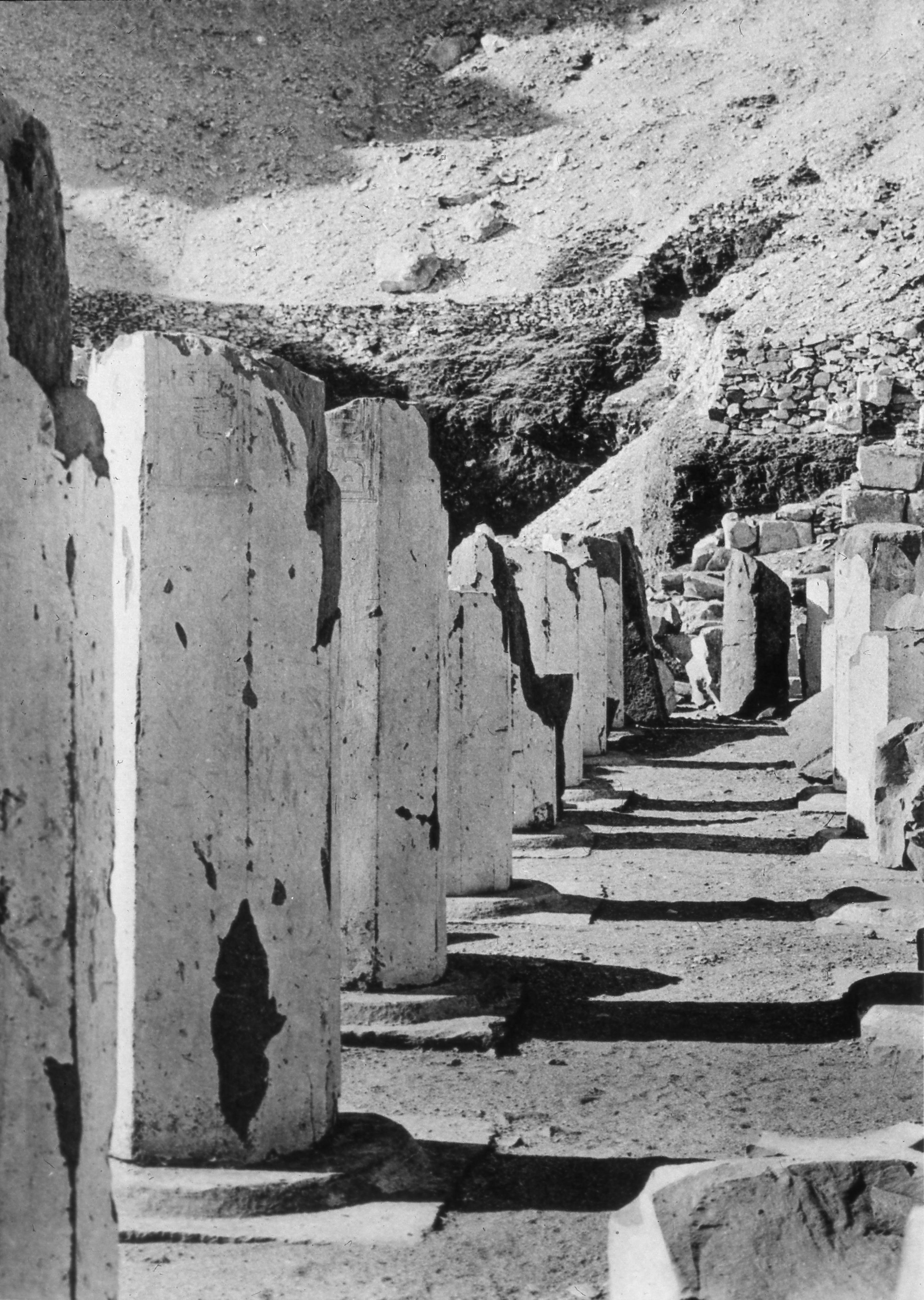
Deir-El-Bahari

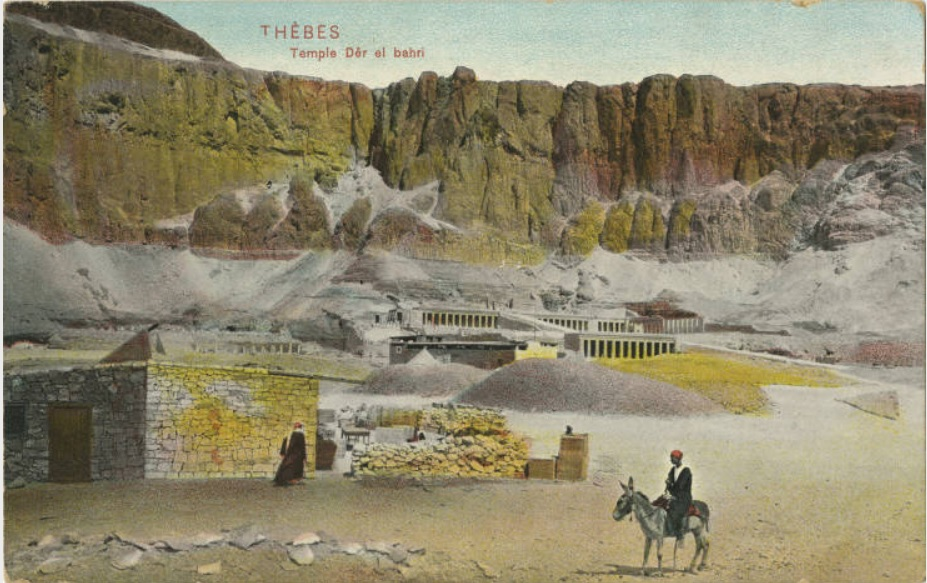
THEBES – Deir el-Bahari temple

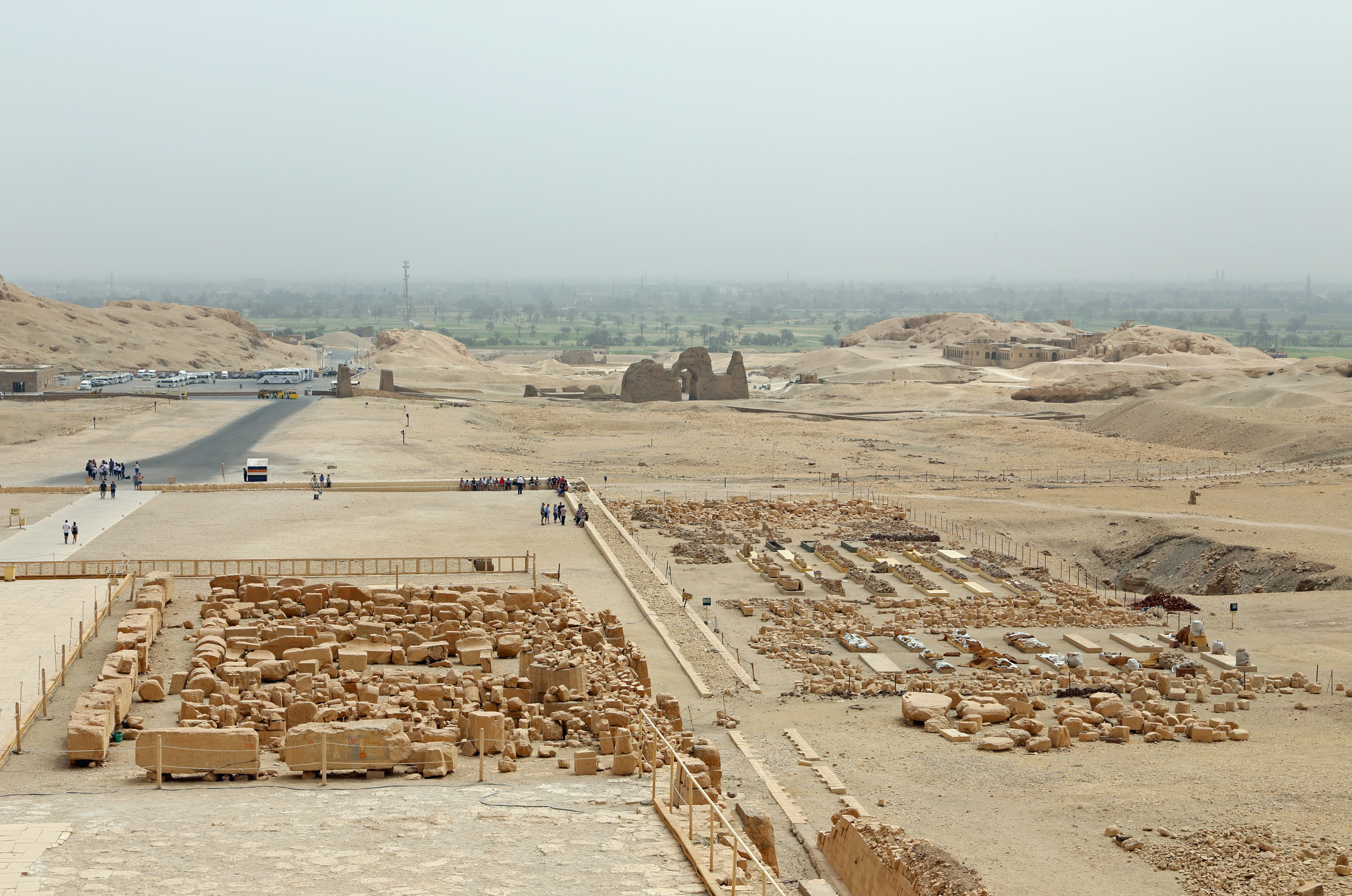
General view of Deir el-Bahari from the Temple of Hatshepsut towards the Nile valley

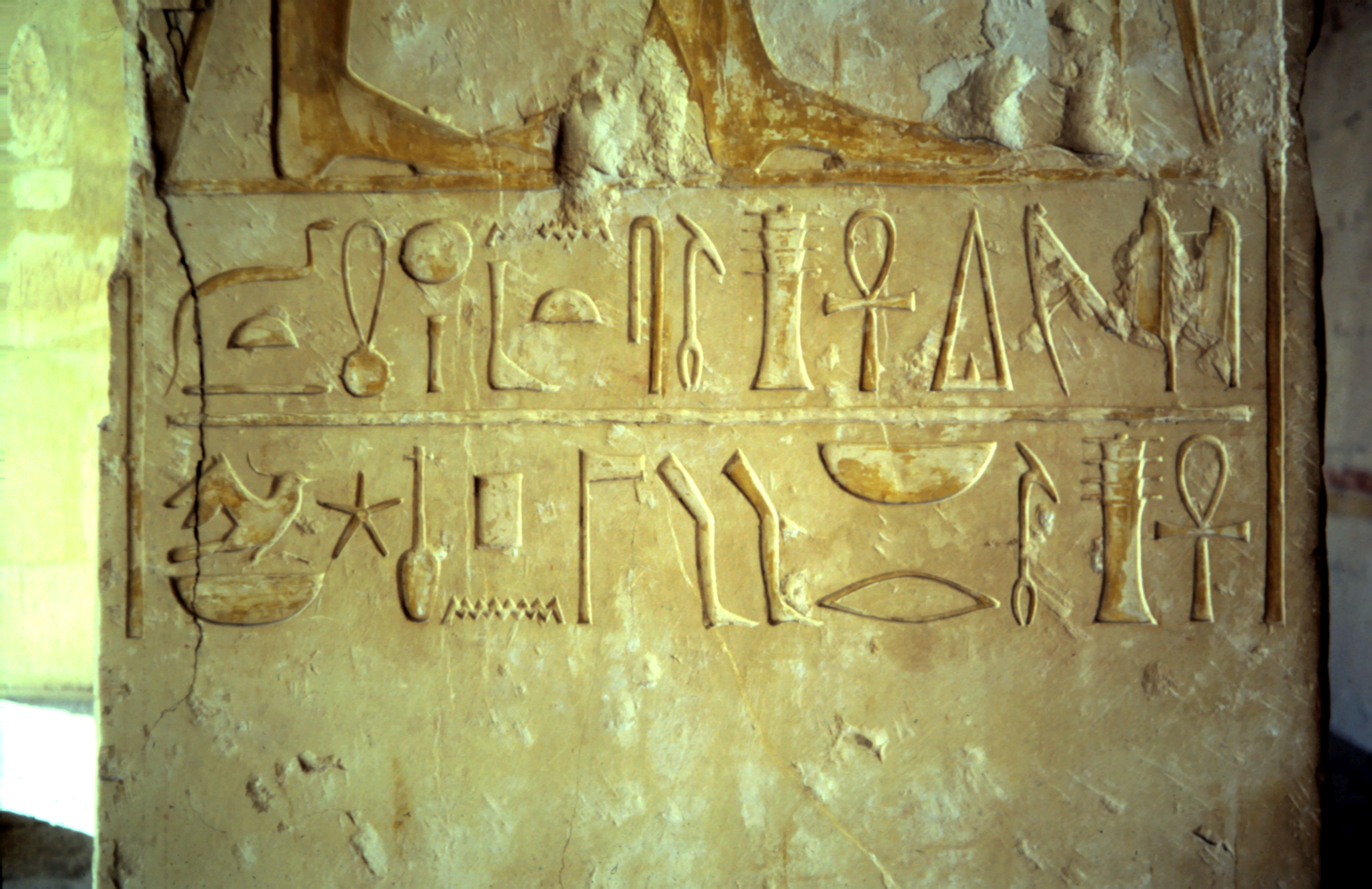
Hieroglyphic inscription at Deir el-Bahari

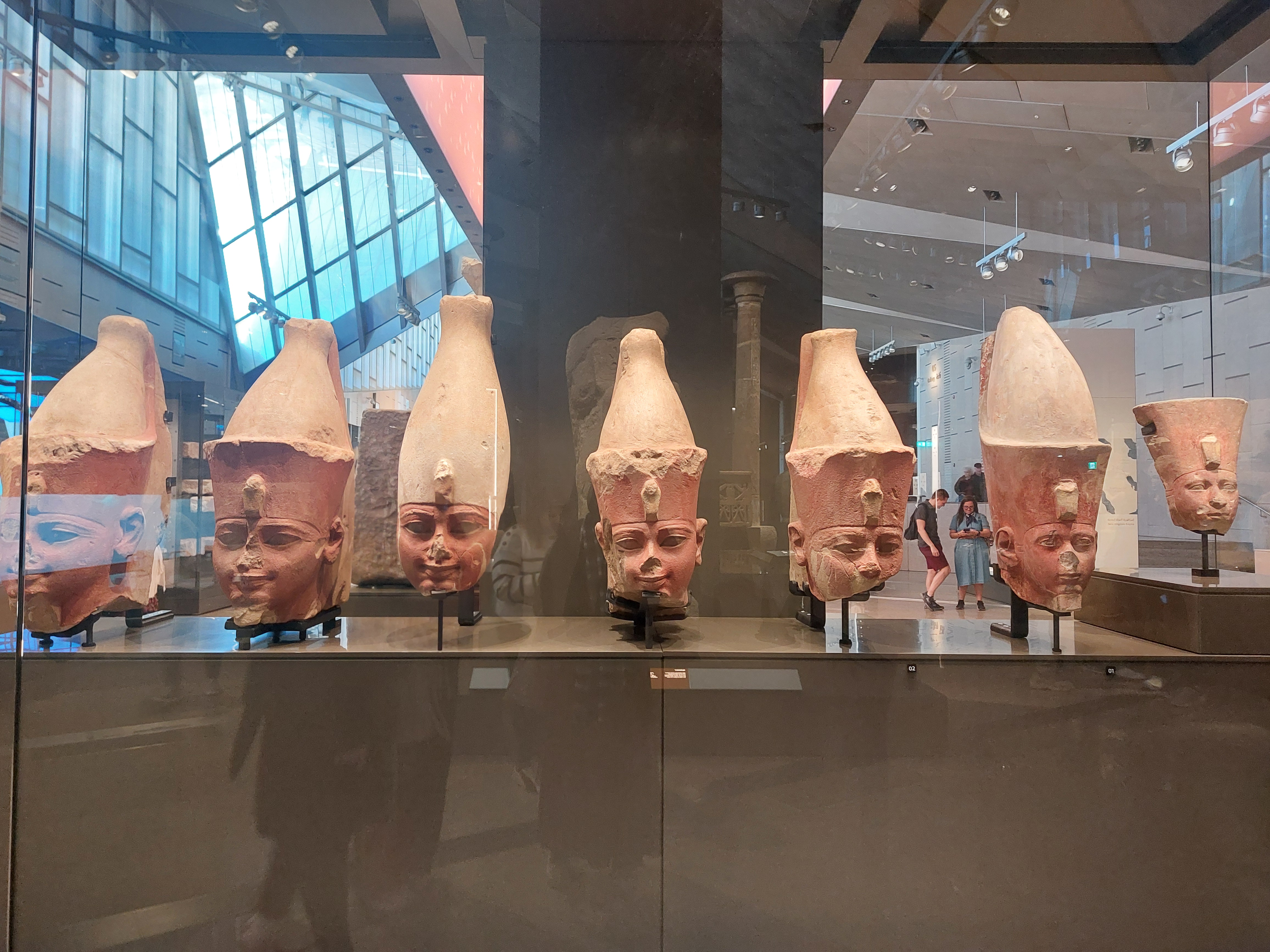
Heads of statues of Amenhotep I and Thutmose III from Deir el-Bahari, now located at the Grand Egyptian Museum

== See also ==
- List of ancient Egyptian sites
- Thebes, Egypt

== Sources ==
- Mertz, Barbara (1964). "Temples, Tombs and Hieroglyphs". New York: Coward-McCann. ISBN 0-87226-223-5
- Monderson, Frederick (2007). Hatshepsut's Temple at Deir el Bahari. Bloomington, Indiana: AuthorHouse. ISBN 978-1425966447.
- Mariette-Bey, Auguste (1877). Deir-el-Bahari. Documents topographiques, historiques et ethnographiques recueillis dans ce temple (in French). Leipzig: J C Hinrichs.

== Publications ==
Publications for the excavations conducted by the Egypt Exploration Fund in the 19th and 20th centuries.
