= Shadi Abdel Salam =

Egyptian film director (1930–1986)

Shadi Abdelsalam
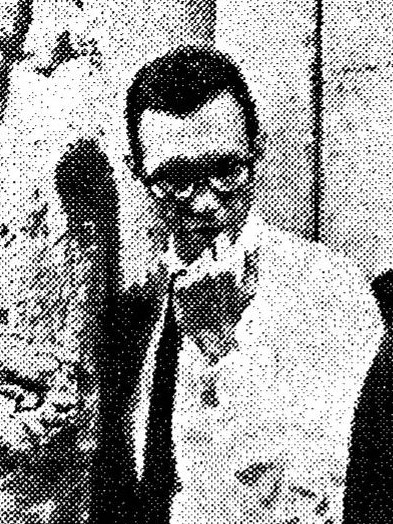
- Born: Shadi Mohamed Mahmoud Abdelsalam Elsabagh; 15 March 1930; Alexandria, Egypt
- Died: 8 October 1986 (aged 56); Cairo, Egypt
- Resting place: Cairo Necropolis
- Citizenship: Egyptian
- Education: Victoria College, Alexandria Faculty of Fine Arts at Cairo University
- Occupations: Film director, screenwriter, designer, architect
- Years active: 1961–1986
- Employer(s): Higher Institute of Cinema, Egyptian film Center, Experimental Film Center (Founder)
- Notable work: The Night of Counting the Years

Shadi Abdel Salam (Arabic: شادي عبد السلام, romanized: Shādī ʿAbd el-Salām, 15 March 1930 – 8 October 1986) was an Egyptian interdisciplinary artist, architect, film director, screenwriter and costume and set designer.

== Early life and education ==
Born in Alexandria on 15 March 1930, Shadi graduated from Victoria College, Alexandria, 1948, Abdel Salam received a diverse education in both Egypt and the United Kingdom. Between 1949 and 1950, he studied theatre arts, drama, philosophy, and law in London. He later returned to Britain in 1956 to continue his studies in drama. In Egypt, he attended the Faculty of Fine Arts in Cairo, graduating with distinction from the Department of Architecture in 1955. During his studies, he was mentored by the influential architect Hassan Fathy, whose emphasis on traditional Egyptian culture, heritage, and design would have a lasting impact on Abdel Salam's artistic and cinematic vision. He worked as assistant to the artistic architect, Ramsis W. Wassef, 1957, and designed the decorations and costumes of some of the most famous historical Egyptian films among which are; Wa Islamah, Maww’ed fil Bourg, Al Nasser Salah Ad-Din, Almaz wa Abdu El Hamouly. He worked as a historical consultant and supervisor of the decoration, costumes and accessories sections of the Polish film, Pharaoh, directed by Jerzy Kawalerowicz.

He also directed the long drama film entitled The Night of Counting the Years (Al-Momiaa), 1968–1969, and he received many film awards for this work. Also directed the Ancient Egyptian short drama film entitled The Eloquent Peasant. Notably, he once worked as the Director of the Ministry of Culture Center for experimental films in 1970. He also wrote the scenario of the long drama film entitled "Ikhnatoun" and finalized the relevant designs from 1974–1985. He has taught at the Cinema Higher Institute of Egypt in the Departments of Decorations, Costumes and Film Direction from 1963–1969. He died on 8 October 1986.

== Career ==
Shadi Abdel Salam began his career in Egyptian cinema during the late 1950s and 1960s as a set and costume designer, contributing to several major historical productions, most notably Saladin the Victorious. His meticulous research into Egyptian history, architecture, and visual culture established his reputation as one of the most distinguished art directors in Egyptian cinema.

In 1969, Abdel Salam made his directorial debut with The Night of Counting the Years (Al-Mummia), a historical drama inspired by the discovery of the Royal Cache at Deir el-Bahari in 1881. The film follows a young member of a tribe that has secretly looted royal tombs for generations and explores themes of cultural identity, historical memory, and national heritage. Widely regarded as one of the greatest Egyptian films ever made, it remains Abdel Salam's best-known work.

The same year, he directed the short film The Eloquent Peasant, an adaptation of the ancient Egyptian tale of the same name. During the 1970s and 1980s, he focused primarily on documentary and educational films dedicated to Egyptian history and culture. These included Afaq, which examined contemporary Egyptian cultural life, and Goyoush El Shams, documenting the spirit of Egyptian soldiers following the October War of 1973. He later directed a series of historical docudramas, including Korssy Tout Ankh Amun El Zahaby, Al Ahramat Wama Kablaha, and Ann Ramses El Thany, all intended to promote awareness of ancient Egyptian civilization and heritage.

For much of the final decade of his life, Abdel Salam devoted himself to an ambitious historical epic about the reign of Pharaoh Akhenaten, known as The Tragedy of the Great House (Akhenaten). He spent nearly ten years researching and developing the project, producing multiple script revisions and completing extensive costume, set, including casting Mohamed Sobhi and Sawsan Badr as Akhantun and Nefertiti, and working on production designs. Despite receiving offers of foreign financing, he insisted that a film about Egyptian history should be funded entirely by Egyptians. The project remained unfinished at the time of his death in 1986.

Abdel Salam's reputation grew significantly after the restoration of The Night of Counting the Years in 2009 by the World Cinema Project of Martin Scorsese. Scorsese described the film as "an astonishing piece of cinema" that is "stately, poetic, with a powerful grasp of time and the sadness it carries," praising its unique sense of history and its meditation on identity, memory, and cultural heritage. He also called the film a masterpiece and one of the greatest Egyptian films ever made, helping introduce Abdel Salam's work to a new international audience.

Material from this unfinished work later formed the basis of The Road to God (Al-Tariq ila Allah), a posthumously completed trilogy consisting of The Fortress, The Dandarawiya, and The Tragedy of the Great House – Akhenaten. Drawing upon Abdel Salam's notes, designs, and surviving footage, the trilogy continued his lifelong exploration of ancient Egyptian spirituality, philosophy, and cultural identity, and was later screened publicly in Egypt by cultural institutions including the Egyptian Opera House and the National Cinema Center.

== Filmography ==
=== Filmography as Director ===
Year	Title	Genre	Note
1969	The Night of Counting the Years	Feature film	Abdelsalam only Feature film
1970	The Eloquent Peasant	Short narrative film	Based on The Eloquent Peasant
1972	Horizons	Documentary	
1974	Armies of the Sun	Documentary	Documentation of the Egyptian Army during October War
1982	Tutankhamon's Chair	Docudrama	
1984	The Pyramids and Before Them	Docudrama	
1986	Ramses II	Docudrama	
	The Fortress	Docudrama	Posthumously completed and released
	El Dandarawiya	Docudrama	Posthumously completed and released
	Akhenaten: The Tragedy of the Great House	Unmade	
2012	The Road to God	Documentary	Posthumously Completed, consists of three short films—The Fortress, The Dandarawiya, and the BTS of The Tragedy of the Great House – Akhenaten

=== Other film work ===
Year	Title	Director	Credit
1961	Wa Islamah (Oh Islam!)	Andrew Marton & Enrico Bomba	Set and costume designer
1962	El Khataya (The Sin)	Hassan El Imam	Art director
1962	Almaz wa Abdu El Hamouly	Helmy Rafla	Set and costume designer
1962	Maw'ed fi al-Burj (Appointment in the Tower)	Ezz El Dine Zulficar	Set designer
1963	El Nasser Salah El Din (Saladin)	Youssef Chahine	Set and costume designer
1963	Shafiqa El-Copteya	Hassan El Imam	Art director / costume designer
1963	Arous El Nil (Bride of the Nile)	Fatin Abdel Wahab	Art director
1963	Rabia al-Adawiya	Niazi Mostafa	Set and costume designer
1964	Amir al-Dahaa	Henry Barakat	Art director and costume designer
1964	Bint Antar (Antar's Daughter)	Niazi Mostafa	Costume designer
1965	Amirat al-Arab	Niazi Mostafa	Set and costume designer
1965	Pharaoh	Jerzy Kawalerowicz	Historical consultant, costume and décor supervisor
1965	Bein al-Qasrein (Palace Walk)	Hassan El Imam	Art director
1967	El Seman wal Kharif (Quail and Autumn)	Hossam El Din Mostafa	Art director
1971	Adwa' al-Madina (City Lights)	Hassan El Imam	Art director

== Museum ==
The Shadi Abdelsalam Museum and Exhibition is a permanent museum and archive dedicated to the life and work of Egyptian filmmaker, artist, and production designer. Located within the Bibliotheca Alexandrina in Alexandria, the museum preserves a large collection of his original sketches, paintings, costume and set designs, photographs, manuscripts, personal belongings, and archival materials related to his films and unrealized projects, particularly his long-planned epic Akhenaten (The Tragedy of the Great House). The museum also features screenings of his films and documentaries about his life and career, serving as an important center for the preservation and study of his artistic legacy and his contribution to Egyptian and world cinema.

== Tribute ==
On 15 March 2015, Google celebrated his 85th birthday with a Google Doodle.
