= The Eloquent Peasant =

Literary work from Ancient Egypt

The Eloquent Peasant (Ancient Egyptian: Sekhti-nefer-medu, "a peasant good of speech") is an Ancient Egyptian story that was composed around 1850 BCE during the time of the Middle Kingdom in Egypt. It is one of the longest Egyptian tales that has survived relatively complete. The tale is about a peasant, Khun-Anup, who stumbles upon the property of the high steward, the noble Rensi son of Meru, guarded by its harsh overseer, Nemtynakht. It is set in the Ninth or Tenth Dynasty around Herakleopolis. This tale is described as an elaborate reflection on the connection – or disconnection – of ethical order and refined speech, as transliterated into refined writing.

sxt t y A1 nfr f r md d w A2
sḫtj nfr mdw
in hieroglyphs
Era: Middle Kingdom
(2055–1650 BC)

== Story summary ==
The story begins with a poor peasant, Khun-Anup, traveling to market with his donkeys heavily laden with goods to exchange for supplies for his family. While Khun-Anup was en route, Nemtynakht, a vassal of the high steward Rensi, notices the peasant approaching his lands and devises a scheme to steal Khun-Anup's donkeys and supplies. Nemtynakht tricks the peasant by placing a cloth on the narrow public path, where one side was bordered by the river and the other side were the private fields of Nemtynakht. His placing of the cloth on the path forces the peasant to either trample the cloth, step into the water, or take his donkeys over Nemtynakht's fields in order to continue his journey. As Khun-Anup is appealing to Nemtynakht's sense of reason in blocking his path with the cloth, one of Khun-Anup's donkeys eats a bite of barley, and Nemtynakht uses this as a justification to take Khun-Anup's donkeys and goods. When Khun-Anup complains this punishment is unfair, Nemtynakht beats him. Khun-Anup cries out for justice, and Nemtynakht threatens the peasant with death if he dares to complain. Khun-Anup does not accept this injustice and continues to appeal to Nemtynakht for ten days.

Failing to receive justice from Nemtynakht, Khun-Anup seeks out the high steward, the noble Rensi son of Meru, and presents his case. Rensi brings the peasant's case to the magistrates, who dismiss the case as merely being a matter of a peasant at odds with a landowner, but Rensi does not relay this information to the peasant. Rensi brings the story of the wronged peasant before the pharaoh, Nebkaure (who is believed to be Nebkaure Khety), telling him how elegantly the peasant speaks. Intrigued by the report of a peasant who speaks so elegantly, the pharaoh instructs Rensi to not respond to the peasant's pleas, so that the peasant would continue to make his elegant speeches and they could be written down for the pharaoh. The pharaoh orders Rensi to feed the peasant and his family while the peasant continues to plead his case, further instructing Rensi not to let the peasant know he was providing the food.

For nine days Khun-Anup complimented the high steward Rensi and begged for justice. After nine days of speeches, Khun-Anup threatened suicide. After sensing that he was being ignored, Khun-Anup insulted Rensi and was punished with a beating. After one last speech, the discouraged peasant left, but Rensi sent for him and ordered him to return. But rather than being punished for his insolence, the peasant was given justice. Rensi, after reading Khun-Anup's last speech, was impressed and ordered the donkeys and the goods to be returned to Khun-Anup and the peasant to be compensated with all the property of Nemtynakht, making Nemtynakht as poor as Khun-Anup had been.

== Characters ==
=== Khun-anup ===
The poor peasant, Khun-Anup, lives with his wife, Marye, and their children in an oasis around the Nile Delta in Egypt.

=== Rensi son of Meru ===
The noble Rensi son of Meru is the high steward of Pharaoh Nebkaure. The peasant Khun-Anup appeals to Rensi when he does not receive justice from Nemtynakht.

=== Nemtynakht ===
A greedy vassal to the high steward Rensi, Nemtynakht notices the peasant Khun-Anup's supply-laden donkeys and devises a trap that will provide him with a reason for taking Khun-Anup's donkeys and goods.

=== Nebkaure ===
He is his Majesty of the Dual King Nebkaure, the justified. "The justified" is a standard epithet of the deceased. Nebkaure is a Pharaoh of the tenth dynasty of Heracleopolis, ca. 2050 BCE, during the First Intermediate Period.

== Themes ==
=== Ma'at ===
Ma'at is the ancient Egyptian law based on the idea of harmony and balance and allows for the social hierarchy to be prevalent in citizen's everyday lives. This theme is present throughout the work, especially in Khun-Anup's speeches about what justice means to his situation.

Ma'at is also exemplified in the courts of the story because justice and social hierarchy is fully dependent on the judge and how he interprets ma'at in relation to the trials.

== Textual history ==
=== Origin ===
While we do have a somewhat cohesive narrative for The Eloquent Peasant, to our current knowledge, a narrative for the entirety of the poem does not exist. The tale is a compilation of four incomplete manuscripts that have some conflict in overlapping sections. The names of people and places seem to differ amongst the four different pieces. Despite this, there is an understanding that they are all versions of the same story. Like most stories, it is implied that different people told the story in different ways - leading to some discrepancies in written versions.

=== Author ===
Information concerning the author (or authors) of the text is minimal. It is assumed that the author(s) were more than likely male(s), but even that information may not be correct. The themes and intellectual points in the story make it evident that the author - if it was one person - was a part of the educated class. He or she was literate enough to put the story in hieroglyphics. The story was likely not originally told in the form of poetry, but was later translated.

=== Time period ===
While the story of The Eloquent Peasant was set in the ninth and tenth dynasties, it is generally accepted that the poem itself was written during the Middle Kingdom, around the same time as the Story of Sinuhe, during Egypt's Classical Age. This time period was said to have produced some of the greatest works of literature and art. The wealthy and well educated Egyptians focused greatly on these aspects, as well as entertainment. The Eloquent Peasant would have been considered a generous amount of both. The poem was also one of the first recorded texts that focused on the lives of people other than the kings or the gods. The story reflected ideals of Egypt at the time among the common people. It was extremely popular.

The Eloquent Peasant was one of the few texts that highlighted some of the concepts of Egyptian law during the Middle Kingdom dynasties.

== Influence on arts and literature ==
The Eloquent Peasant was adapted into an award winning short film with the same name, directed by Egyptian director Shadi Abdel Salam in 1969.
