= Ahmed Hegazi (actor) =

Egyptian actor (1935–2002)

Ahmad Hegazi
- Born: 18 June 1935
- Died: 15 June 2002 (aged 66)
- Citizenship: Egypt
- Occupation: Actor
- Notable work: The Night of Counting the Years

Ahmad Hegazi (or Ahmed Hejazi) (Arabic: أحمد حجازى), (18 June 1935 – 15 June 2002) was an Egyptian actor whose best known movie was The Night of Counting the Years (Al-Mummia).

== Filmography ==
- 1969: The Night of Counting the Years ..... Ayub
- 1973: In Desert and Wilderness ..... Gebhr
- 1974: In Desert and Wilderness (miniseries) ..... Gebhr
- 1976: Casimir the Great ...... Tatars' Commander
- 1981: Sphinx
- 1990: Alexandria Again and Forever
