= The Night of Counting the Years =

1969 Egyptian film

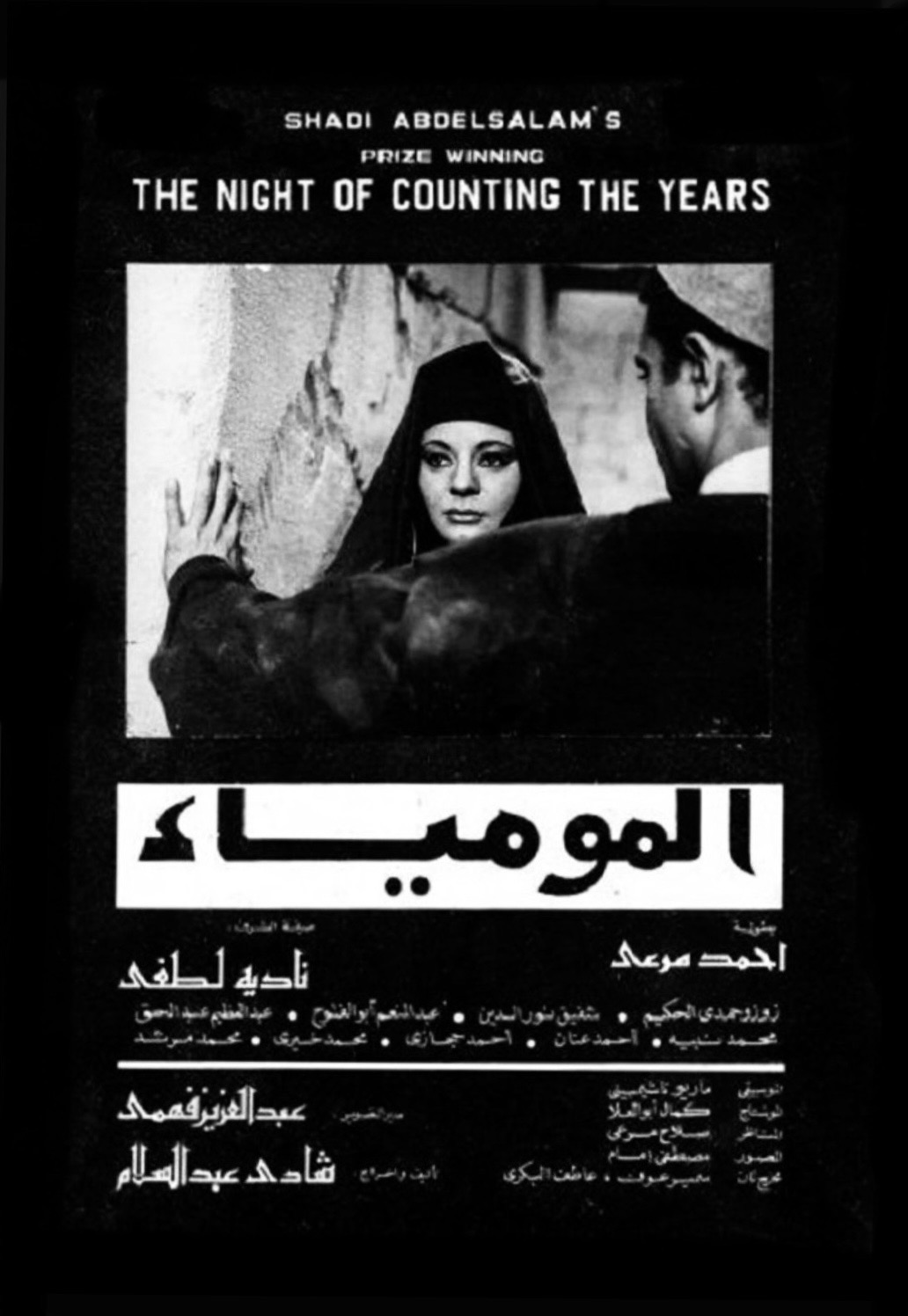
- Theatrical release poster
- Directed by: Shadi Abdel Salam
- Written by: Shadi Abdel Salam
- Produced by: Roberto Rossellini
- Starring: Ahmed Marei; Ahmad Hegazi; Nadia Lutfi
- Cinematography: Abdel Aziz Fahmy
- Edited by: Kamal Abou-El-Ella
- Music by: Mario Nascimbene
- Production companies: General Egyptian Cinema Organisation; Merchant Ivory Productions
- Distributed by: General Egyptian Cinema Organisation; Merchant Ivory Productions
- Release date: 1969 (Egypt)
- Running time: 102 minutes
- Country: Egypt
- Language: Classical Arabic

The Night of Counting the Years, also released in Egypt as The Mummy (Arabic: المومياء, romanized: Elmomya), is a 1969 Egyptian film and the only feature film directed by Shadi Abdel Salam. It features a special appearance by Nadia Lutfi. It is the 3rd on the list of Top 100 Egyptian films. The film was produced by Roberto Rossellini for General Egyptian Cinema Organisation. Rossellini was instrumental in encouraging Abdel Salam to make the film, which tells a story set among the grave robbers of Kurna in Upper Egypt.

It remains one of the best examples of neo-realism in Egyptian cinema. Other notable examples include Youssef Chahine's Al Ard (The Earth, 1969) and Al Usfur (The Sparrow, 1972) as well as Tewfik Saleh's Al Makhdu'un (The Dupes, 1973).

"Shadi Abdel Salam's The Mummy was the forerunner of what was to become the hallmark of the neo realism, namely, the preoccupation with the search for identity and the relationship between heritage and character." The relationship between contemporary and Ancient Egypt is dealt with allegorically in the film. The static images of landscape and the rigid expressions of the main characters reflect those of the statues and reliefs found in Ancient Egypt. The use of classical Arabic, not Egyptian dialect which is normally used in Egyptian cinema, reinforces the impression of monumentalism.

The unrestrained sacking of the tombs is represented as a danger, threatening moral decline by inviting greed and sex to undermine the dignity of the tribe and its traditions, replacing the order of the world with chaos.

Shadi Abdel Salam has said that his task was to remind Egyptians of their own history: "I think that the people of my country are ignorant of our history and I feel that it is my mission to make them know some of it. I regard cinema not as a consumerist art, but as a historical document for the next generations." Although he went on to direct short fiction and documentaries, The Night of Counting the Years remains Abdel Salam's only full length feature film.

The film was selected as the Egyptian entry for the Best Foreign Language Film at the 43rd Academy Awards, but was not accepted as a nominee.

== Plot ==
This film is set in 1881, when Egypt was under the failing rule of the Ottoman Khedives, themselves overseen by the Anglo-French Caisse de la Dette, and a year before the start of British colonial rule. It is based on the true story of the Abd el-Rassuls, an Upper-Egyptian clan that is stealing piecemeal a cache of mummies they have discovered at a tomb (known to modern Egyptologists as DB320) near the village of Kurna, and selling the artefacts on the black market.

The film begins with Wanis (Ahmed Marei) and his older brother (Ahmed Hegazy) watching the funeral of their father Selim. The brothers have become the heads of the Horabat tribe, and their uncle shows them its dark secret – the tribe has been living off the treasures of the ancient pharaohs buried in tombs within the mountain on which they live. The brothers are shocked on seeing their uncle beheading a mummy to obtain a gold necklace. They feel their life is built on a lie. The older brother complains to the family, who kill him and throw his body into the Nile. The secret thus falls solely onto the shoulders of Wanis, who struggles to reconcile his conscience with his loyalty to his people.

The city people (effendis), wealthy Egyptian archeologists, have come - unusually in the hot summer - to try to identify the source of unexplained artefacts which have been found on the black market, following a meeting with French Egyptologist Gaston Maspero. The trading has been led by Ayoub (Shafiq Noureddin), via Murad (Mohamed Babih), who also runs a brothel.

Wanis tells Ayoub that the tribe will not trade with him again. Murad then tells Wanis that his uncle arranged for his brother to be killed; Murad says that Ayoub has sent him to repair the relationship with Wanis and acquire the remaining treasure. Wanis refuses, and walks to the steamboat carrying the effendi leadership. A team of archaeologists and soldiers are sent to the tomb, and the tomb is emptied of all the sarcophagi, which are loaded onto the boat.

== Cast ==
- Ahmed Marei as Wannis (inspired by the 5th Dynasty King Unas)
- Ahmad Hegazi as Brother
- Nadia Lutfi as Zeena
- Ahmad Anan as Badawi
- Shafik Nour El Din as Ayoub
- Zouzou Hamdy El-Hakim as Mother
- Gaby Karraz as Maspero (based on Egyptologist Gaston Maspero)
- Mohamed Khairi as Kamal (based on Egyptologist Ahmed Kamal)
- Mohamed Nabih as Murad

== Release ==
In the United Kingdom, Contemporary Films distributed The Night of Counting the Years. In the United States, New Yorker Films released The Night of Counting the Years in 1975.

== Reception ==
Critical reception for The Night of Counting the Years has been very positive, with Egyptian critics consistently list it as one of the greatest Egyptian films ever made. Aaron Cutler from Slant Magazine called it "both a classic film and a classic Arabic (language) film". Time Out London praised the film, calling it "Slow-moving but absorbing, and quite beautifully shot."

The film was not without its detractors. Richard Eder of The New York Times was critical of the film, writing, "Most of the movie, is done with stupefying grandiloquence. Wherever the camera touches, it sticks and won't let go. Landscape, brooding close-ups—and how they all do brood—interminable patterns of black-robed figures against the white sand: Every shot lingers and lingers. The acting is heavy and hieratic, fogged with a pretentious mysticism."

== Restoration ==
The film's original copy was restored in 2009 at L'Immagine Ritrovata Laboratory, Bologna, Italy. The restoration process was supported by the World Cinema Foundation, founded by renowned American director Martin Scorsese, and the Egyptian Ministry of Culture.

The restored version premiered in Bibliotheca Alexandrina in 2009 with Martin Scorsese attending it, among other figures from Egypt and abroad.

== See also ==
- List of Egyptian films of the 1960s
- List of Egyptian films of 1969
- Grave robbing
- List of submissions to the 43rd Academy Awards for Best Foreign Language Film
- List of Egyptian submissions for the Academy Award for Best Foreign Language Film

== Bibliography ==
- Colla, Elliott (6 October 2000). Beyond Colonialism and Nationalism in the Maghrib: History, Culture, and Politics. New York: Palgrave Macmillan. pp. 109–146 ("Shadi Abd al-Salam's al-Mumiya: Ambivalence and the Egyptian Nation-State"). ISBN 978-0-312-22287-1.
- Shafik, Viola (1998). Arab Cinema: History and Cultural Identity. Cairo: American University in Cairo Press. p. 51. ISBN 978-9774244759.
