= List of Egyptian films of 1932 =

A list of films produced in Egypt in 1932. For an A-Z list of films currently on Wikipedia, see Category:Egyptian films.

Title	Director	Cast	Genre	Notes
Awlad Al-Zawat (Sons of Aristocrats)	Mohammed Karim	Youssef Wahbi, Amina Rizk		First soundtrack film in Egypt, Africa and the Arab World
Ounchoudat Al-Fouad (The Song of the Heart)	Mario Volpi	Nadra, George Abyad		
Al-Dahaya (The Victims)	Ibrahim Lama	Bahiga Hafez, Zaki Rostom		
Goha wa Abu Nuwas (Goha and Abu Nuwas)	Manuel Vimance	Khaled Chawki, Ismail Zaki		
Mostafa Aw Al-Sahir Al-Saghir (Mostafa or the Little Magician)	Mahmoud Khalil Rached	Mostafa Kamel Rached		
Khamsat Alaf wa Wahid (5001)	Togo Mizrahi	Shalom, Dawlat Ramzi		
Makhzan Al-'ouchchaq (The Store For Lovers)	Carlo Bobba	Mohamed Kamal al-Masri, Nadia		

== See also ==
- List of Egyptian films of 1933
