= Milia Dayan =

Syrian-Jewish actress

- ميليا ديان
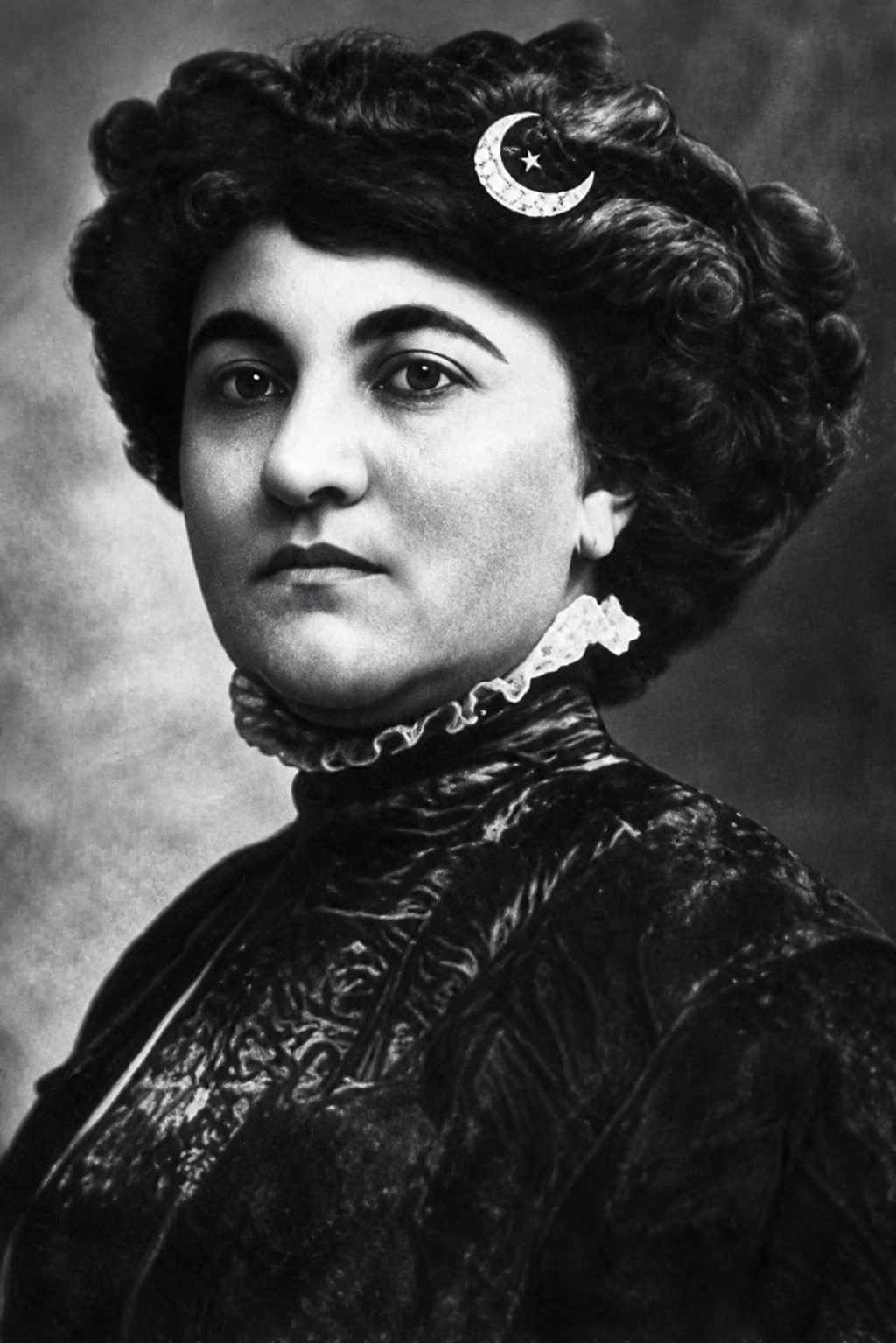
- Born: Ottoman Empire
- Occupation: Actress
- Years active: 1870s-1920s
- Era: late 19th century to early 20th century
- Known for: Pioneer of modern Arabic theatre

Milia Dayan (Arabic: ميليا ديان) was a Syrian-Jewish actress who performed in theatres in Egypt from the 1870s to the 1920s. She is known as one of the first professional and successful actresses in Egypt and the Arab world.

== Life and career ==
=== Background ===
In 1870, Yaqub Sanu (1839–1912) founded his company for modern theatre in Egypt. He has been considered the founder of modern theatre in Egypt and was called "the Molière of Egypt". As a young man, he had watched opera and theatre performances and also participated in plays in Italy. After his return to Egypt, he set up the country's first playhouse for Egyptian audiences, wrote plays in Arabic and trained his actors.

While Sanu was able to sign Egyptian male actors, he experienced great difficulty to engage Egyptian actresses. At this time, when seclusion and harem gender segregation were still widely practiced in Egypt, it was not acceptable for a Muslim woman to appear acting on a stage. Before Milia Dayan started her career, other non-Muslim actresses from Ottoman Syria had been introduced to Egyptian theatre by Syrian stage director Abu Khalil al-Qabbani.

=== Acting career ===
Looking to engage non-Muslim women for his modern style of theatre, Sanu found two poor Jewish girls from Ottoman Syria: Milia Dayan and her sister Liza. As they were illiterate, he instructed them to read and write as well as in acting, and they started their career in Sanu's theatrical troupe. From the beginning, women acting on the stage were accepted by Egyptian audiences, who even protested when the principal male and female characters did not marry at the end of the play.

After Sanu's troupe was dissolved in 1872, Dayan was the leading artist in the companies of directors Iskandar Farah and Salama Hegazi. With Hegazi's troupe, she performed female roles in Arabic translations of plays including Hamlet, Othello, Marie Tudor, The Lady of the Camellias and The Miser. In 1905 she was noted for her excellent interpretation of the role of Catherine, the wife of the main character Angelo, in Victor Hugo's historical play Angelo, Tyrant of Padua. At Hegazi's funeral in 1917, she recited a poem on behalf of the actresses in his troupe. In the theatre company of Abdul Rahman Rushdie, she was paid the unusually high fee of twenty Egyptian pounds per month. Dayan also performed in the companies of Omar Surrey, Aziz Eid and George Abyad, and in 1924 had her last engagement in the troupe of Mounira El Mahdeya.

Miliia Dayan is known as among the earliest actresses in Arabic theatre, also including Maryam Samat, Labiba Manoli and her sister Mariam, as well as the sisters Ibriz and Almaz Estati, all of whom were non-Muslim women. In November 1905 the newspaper Al-Watan called Dayan “the genius of Arab actresses in the East”, and the same newspaper described her as the “Sarah Bernhardt of the East” in February 1912.

=== Personal life ===
For seven years, Dayan was married to the wealthy landowner Muharram Rostom. Until her husband's death, she retired from acting, but returned to the stage afterwards.

== See also ==
- Arabic literature - Theatre
- Afife Jale, first Muslim actress in Turkey
- Arousyak Papazian, first actress in Ottoman Turkey
