= Song of the Heart =

Song of the Heart may refer to:

- Kundiman ng Puso (Song of the Heart), a 1958 Filipino film
- "The Song of the Heart" (song), a 2006 song by the musician Prince
- The Song of the Heart (1955 film), an Italian film
- The Song of the Heart (1932 film), an Egyptian film
