= Mounira El Mahdeya =

Egyptian singer and actress (1885–1965)

Mounira El Mahdeya منيرة المهدية
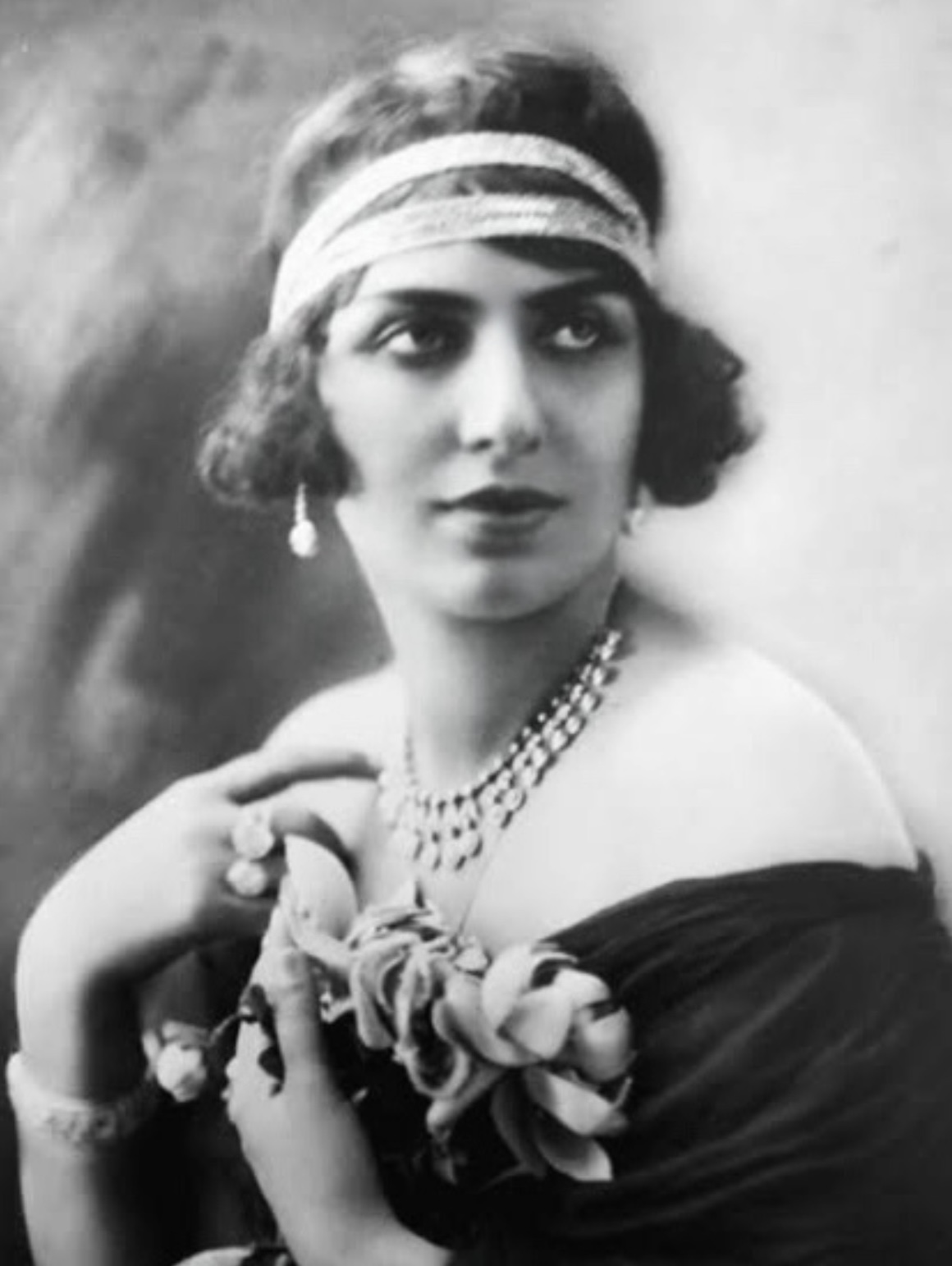
- Mounira El Mahdeya in the 1920s

Background information
- Born: Zakiyya Hesin Mansur; 16 May 1885; Al Mahdeya, Sharqia Governorate, Egypt
- Died: 12 March 1965 (aged 79) Cairo, Egypt
- Genres: Arabic musical theatre and popular Arabic music of the 1920s
- Occupations: Singer and actress
- Years active: 1905–1948
- Labels: Odeon Records, Baidaphon

Mounira El Mahdeya, also spelled Monira Elmahdiyya (born Zakiyya Hesin Mansur, Arabic: منيرة المهدية; 16 May 1885 – 12 March 1965) and also known by the stage name "Sultana al-Tarab" (Queen of Singing), was an Egyptian singer and actress. She became known as the first Muslim actress on a theatre stage and the leading Egyptian female singer in the 1920s. Further, she was one of the few Egyptian women featured in commercial recordings before World War I.

In the 21st century, El Mahdeya's life and career have received renewed interest in scholarly publications, an exhibition about Arab female musical stars as well as in contemporary music by Egyptian musician Nancy Mounir.

== Background ==
In the 19th century, educated women artists specializing in singing, dance and poetry were called Almah (literally: trained, Pl.: ‘awālim). Usually they only performed in private settings for a female audience or for male listeners behind a curtain. In the twentieth century, many changes came about for women performing music: Musical theatres and other public venues provided new opportunities for singers. Further, the increasing number of sound recordings made music available for artists and audiences of both genders.

These new forms of performance also corresponded to a change from Arabic classical music to lighter popular entertainment music. Nightlife in Cairo was particularly vibrant in the streets and gardens of Azbakeya, one of the capital's central districts. Numerous theatres, cabarets, dance halls, cafés and salons offered singers such as Mounira El Mahdeya possibilities to step out of the private sphere and start a career as successful artists of the Arabic entertainment business.

== Early life ==
Mounira El Mahdeya was born as Zakiyya Hesin Mansur on 16 May 1885. Her birthplace was Al Mahdeya village or Zagazig, the capital of Sharqia Governorate in Lower Egypt. She was educated in a French Catholic nuns’ school in Alexandria.

== Career ==
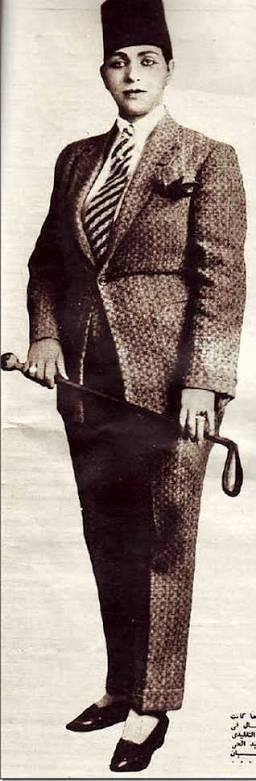
Mounira El Mahdeya dressed as a man

Having been invited by a nightclub owner in Cairo, she began her career as singer in local clubs in the Azbakeya entertainment district. In 1915, she joined the theatre of Aziz Eid, known for encouraging and developing the talents of his actors, among them many future stars such as Fatma Roshdi. She was also part of the ensemble of Salama Hegazi, and when he fell ill, she sang his role, dressed onstage as a man in the play Salah al-Din al-Ayubi. As a result, she is considered to be the first Egyptian Muslim woman to perform on a public stage.

She performed the popular Arabic musical repertoire of her time, as well as Arabic adaptations of popular Italian operas, with her performances becoming popular and increasingly demanded by the public. She also interpreted male roles such as Romeo and Mark Antony in a play about Cleopatra during a time when only women from the non-Muslim minorities performed onstage in Egypt.

Her café, called “Nuzhat al-Nufūs” (“Promenade of Souls”), was a meeting place for intellectuals, artists and businessmen before World War I and could stay open in 1914, although the administration of the British Protectorate of Egypt had closed all similar venues. From 1917 to 1925 she directed the first female-owned musical theatre troupe in Egypt. Her performances reflected the growing popularity of new and lighter song forms, such as the taqtuqa, a genre that reflected women's experiences in Egypt and that she performed for a female audience. As she mastered the vocal technique of an educated almah singer of 19th century, she also was able to perform the dawr musical style and qasida poetry, which she sang for a male audience.

El Mahdeya is considered the first Egyptian singer featured on a sound recording. Her earliest recordings were published between 1905 and 1907 by the record companies Zoophone and Odeon under the stage name Sett Monirah (Lady Monirah). After 1914 she recorded for the German-Lebanese company Baidaphon. Following World War I, she performed with her own music group in the Arab world (Lebanon, Iraq, Syria, Palestine, Libya, Tunisia, Morocco), as well as in Turkey and Iran. Her popularity enabled her to build a network of fans from different social groups and countries. As she was known for nationalist views in her performances, her theatre was described as a place of freedom. Known as “Sultana al-Tarab” she sang for kings and politicians, including Turkish president Mustafa Kemal Atatürk.

El Mahdeya's career came to an end in the course of the 1930s and was overshadowed by the success of Umm Kulthum. Her last concert in 1948 coincided with the Palestine War and was a failure. After that, she withdrew from public life except for occasional interviews in the media. El Mahdeya died on March 12, 1965, two months before her 80th birthday.

In 1978, a film titled Soltanet El-Tarab about her life was directed by Hassan El-Emam, starring Sherifa Fadel.

== Filmography ==
- 1935: El Ghandourah (La Coquette) starring Mounira El Mahdeya and Ahmad Allam, directed by Mario Volpi

== Selected discography ==
- Munira El Mahdeya - Golden Memories Vol. 1 (remastered), 2013
- Munira El Mahdeya -The Best of Vol. 1 - 12, 2023

== Awards and honours ==
=== Egypt ===
- Egypt: 1926: Award of excellence in a theatrical singing contest by the Ministry of Public Works
- Egypt: 1960: Grand Cross of the Order of Merit
- Egypt: 1961: Egyptian National Award Order of Sciences and Arts (1st class)

== Reception ==
Thirteen years after her death, the biographical feature film Sultana al-Tarab, directed by Hassan El-Imam, was released in 1978, with Sharifa Fadel starring as Mounira El Mahdeya. The 2021 book Midnight in Cairo – the Divas of Egypt’s roaring 20s by Rafael Cormack portrayed El Mahdeya as a successful artist against the backdrop of political and societal changes in the 1920s. In his article about the Roaring Twenties in Cairo, Cormack quoted from the diary of British writer C.R. Ashbee: Having witnessed a theatrical performance in a village near Cairo in 1917, Ashbee wrote: "I have had a great experience. I’ve seen real living Shakespearean popular drama – tragedy as it must have been played in Europe 250 years ago." According to Cormack, the leading actress was Mounira El Mahdeya "who not only charmed the audience during the play but returned afterwards to sing several songs as an encore."

In his article about music history in Egypt, Arabist Frédéric Lagrange described El Mahdeya as an example of a modern, independent vocal artist who, through her success, developed from an almah to mutriba, a 20th-century singer of popular Arabic music. Further, the Lebanese Amar Foundation published several pages and podcasts in Arabic and English about El Mahdeya's career and vocal style. In her work Popular Dance and Music in Modern Egypt, Middle Eastern cultural historian Sherifa Zuhur described the cultural background and career of El Mahdeya in a chapter on the development of the Egyptian entertainment industry from the theatre to the film screen.

In their 2021 exhibition Divas. D'Oum Kalthoum à Dalida the Institut du monde arabe in Paris portrayed El Mahdeya as an early example of female Arab music stars in the years before the later successes of Umm Kulthum, Warda, Asmahan and Fairuz. For her 2022 album Nozhet El Nofous (Promenade of Souls), Egyptian experimental musician Nancy Mounir used her own arrangements with almost forgotten historical sound recordings, including El Mahdeya singing her tune "Baad El Esha" ("Late in the Evening"). A video collage by Mounir and other artists with this adaptation was previously performed at the Jazzfest Berlin in November 2021.

== See also ==
- Music of Egypt - Modern Egyptian music
- Milia Dayan
