= Leila Mourad =

Leila Mourad ليلى مراد
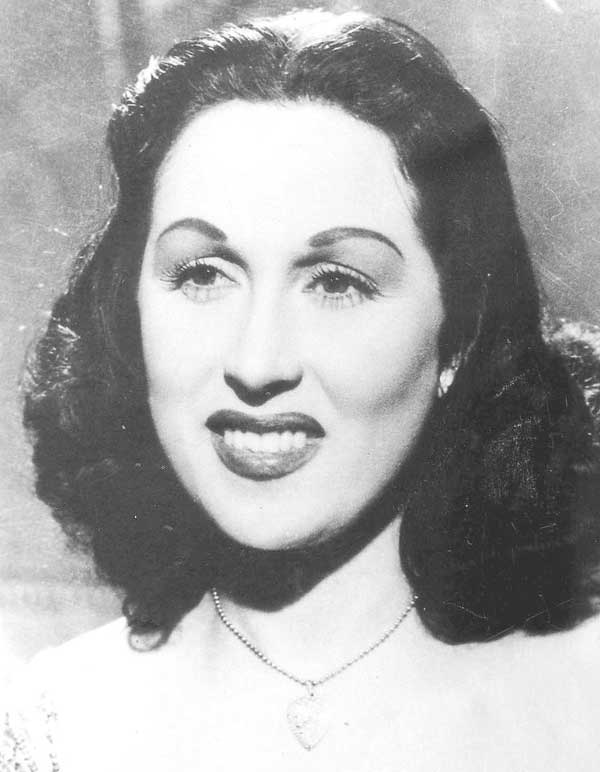
- Layla Mourad in 1947.

Background information
- Born: Lilian Zaki Ibrahim Mourad; February 17, 1918; Cairo, Egypt
- Died: November 21, 1995 (aged 77) Cairo, Egypt
- Genres: Egyptian music
- Occupations: Singer; actress
- Years active: 1934–1963

Leila Mourad or Layla Morad (Arabic: ليلى مراد; February 17, 1918 – November 21, 1995) was an Egyptian singer and actress, and one of the most prominent superstars in Egypt and the entire Arab world in her era. Born Lilian Zaki Ibrahim Mourad in the El Daher District in Cairo, she later changed her name to Leila Mourad as a stage name. Leila married three times and divorced three times. She died in 1995.

== Life ==
Leila Mourad was born on February 17, 1918, to Jewish parents of Polish descent on her mother’s side and of Syrian descent on her father’s side, Zaki Mourad and Gamilah Ibrahim Roushou, the daughter of Ibrahim Roushou, a local concert contractor in the early 20th century who regularly booked Zaki Mourad to sing at concerts and wedding parties. Her father was a respected singer, musician, and religious Jewish cantor (Hazzan). One of her brothers, Mounir Mourad, was an actor and composer.

She made her first stage appearance, aged nine, at the Saalat Badi'a, one of Cairo's most successful Music Halls. The theatre had been founded in 1926 by the actress and dancer Badia Masabni, who became Mourad's patron. Her first film appearance, aged fifteen, was in the 1932 " Al-Dahaaya " (The Victims) which had originally been made as a silent film. Her song, The Day of Departure, was added as part of the transformation of the production into a "talkie".

She was trained by her father and Dawood Hosni, who was also Jewish. Hosni had composed the first operetta in the Arabic language, and he composed two songs for Leila: Hairana Leh Bein El-Eloub (Why can't you choose from among lovers), and Howa el dala'a ya'ani khessam (Does daliance mean avoiding me?). Further success came when the prominent Egyptian composer Mohammed Abdel Wahab heard her singing and gave her a role in his film Yahia el Hob (Viva Love!) in 1938. In the six years following the success of Yahia el Hob she made five best selling films with director Togo Mizrahi, becoming Egypt's top actress. In 1945 she made Layla Bint al-Fuqara ("Layla, daughter of the poor") directed by Anwar Wagdi whom she married shortly after. She went on to make a further 20 films of which the most outstanding is Ghazel el-Banat ("The Flirtation of Girls"), also directed and co-starring Wagdi. It also featured Nagib al-Rihani and Abdel Wahab in their last appearances on film.

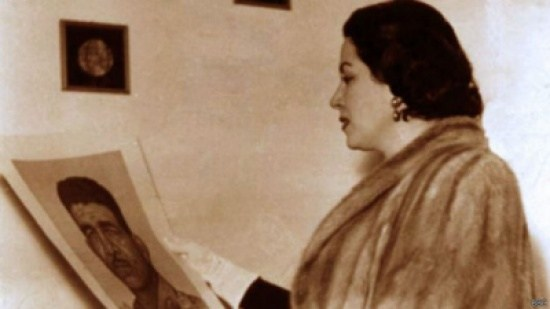
Layla holding a photo of Egypt's President Mohamed Naguib, circa 1953.

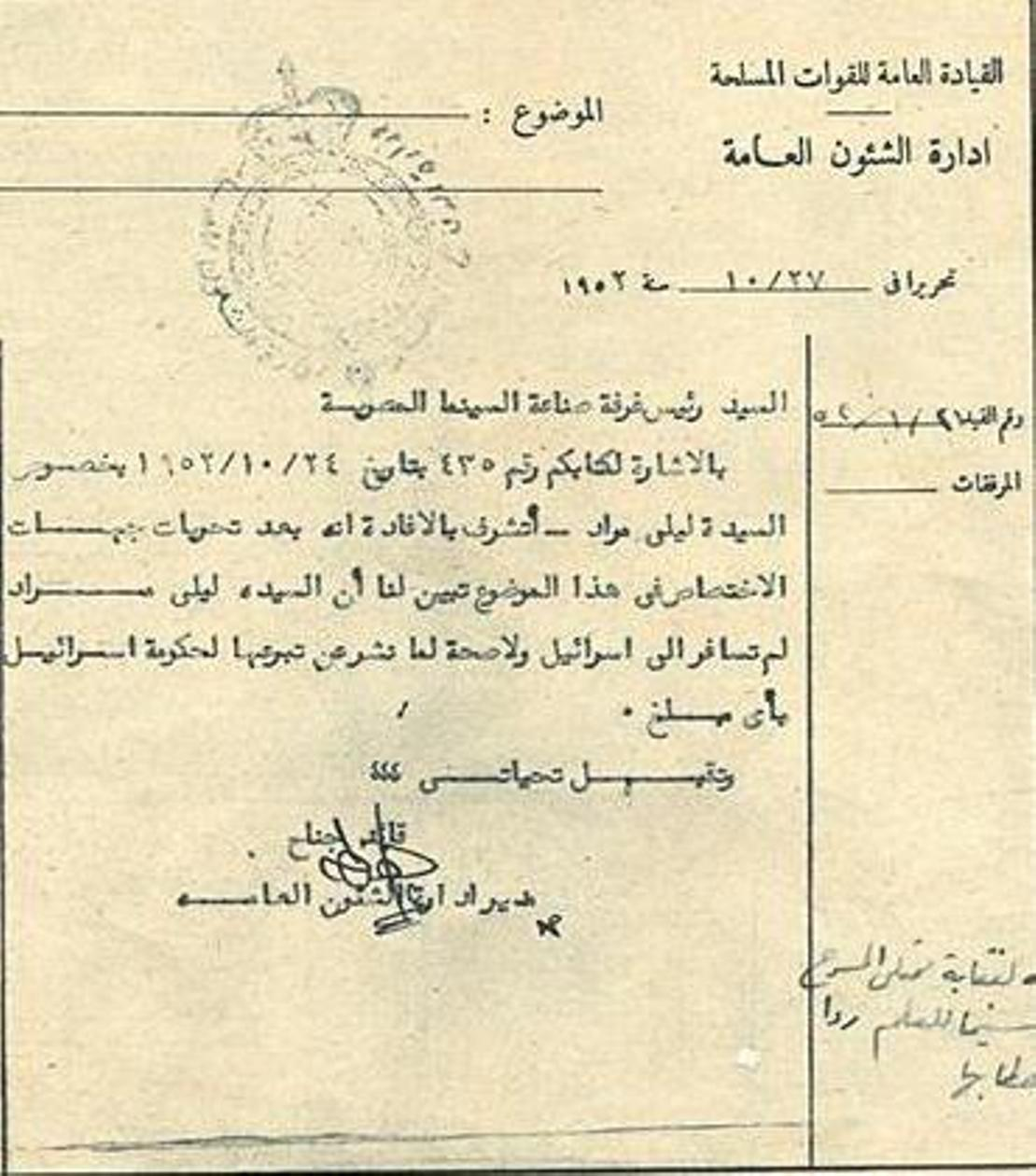
A letter written by the Egyptian Army general command denying the allegations held against Layla, October 27, 1952.

In 1953, she was selected, over Umm Kulthum, as the official singer of the Egyptian revolution. Shortly thereafter, a rumor that Mourad had visited Israel, where she had family, and donated money to its military, raised suspicions of spying and caused some Arab radio stations to boycott her. She denied these allegations, insisting she is a Muslim . No proof was found that she had contributed money to Israel's military; the Egyptian government investigated and concluded that the charges against the singer were without foundation, but there was no denial that she may have sent money to other members of her family who had fled to Israel.

Her decision to retire, aged 38, came with the failure of her last film, Al Habib al Majhoul (The Unknown Lover), the banning of her song, With Unity, Order, and Work, praising the Free Officers 1952 revolution and the outbreak of the 1956 war. Despite the immense popularity of her films her singing career was over-shadowed by Um Kulthum who dominated Egypt's musical landscape and, in 1949, had become president of the Musicians' Union. In the early 1950s other singers became popular with younger audiences, such as Abdel al Halim Hafez, whose song Jesus (Al Massih) claimed that the Jews today are the same as those who persecuted Jesus.

Leila Mourad converted to Islam in 1946 a few months after marrying Egyptian actor Anwar Wagdy, over the objection of her father, as intermarriage with Muslims in Egypt means that the offspring are by law Muslims, regardless of the parents' wishes. In a television interview with famed Egyptian TV presenter Mona Alshazly, her son Zaki Fateen Abdul Wahab denied any rift between her and her family after her conversion and added that her conversion was her own decision without any pressure from her Muslim husband. It's notable that her only sister Sameeha (who married a Muslim Egyptian businessman and immigrated with him to the USA) and her brother Muneer Mourad, a famous musician in his own rght, have also converted to Islam.

Leila Mourad made a few brief reappearances during Ramadan in 1970, when she was scheduled to read Salah Jaheen's "Fawazeer Ramadan" (Ramadan' puzzles), a daily traditional radio program held during the Holy month of Ramadan. During that time, some Egyptian Jewish men between the ages of 17 and 60-65 were subjected to arrest, and were incarcerated in the prisons of Abu Zabal and Tura. Her brother, Ishak Mourad, was one of the Jewish prisoners. While families could occasionally visit the incarcerated Jews, neither she, her sister Sameeha nor her other brother Mounir Mourad were ever seen visiting Ishak.

Leila Mourad died in a Cairo hospital in 1995 and her funeral held at the Sayida Nefeesa mosque in Cairo.

== Marriages ==
Leila Mourad married Anwar Wagdi (married 1945 – divorced 1953), over the objection of her father. She married him and divorced. Leila gave the reason for her divorce as the fact that she was not fully aware of the seriousness of Wagdi's illness, one that made him constantly irritable and difficult to live with. Yet, According to the book, "Laila Mourad, the Muslim Jewish star of Egypt", she accused him of being behind the accusations that she contributed to the Israeli military. According to the same book, she had an out of wedlock child from a relationship with a regime officer, who never acknowledged that he was the father . Then she married a film director Fatin Abdel Wahab in 1957 and she gave birth to their son Zaki Fatin Abdel Wahab, and finally divorced in 1969.

== Discography ==
Almost all of Laila Mourad's most popular songs are from her musical films.

- "Yama Arak El-Nasim" (How Calm the Breeze is) from Yahya El-Hob (1938)
- "Ghany Ya Tair" (Sing, Bird) from Laila Bint Madares (1941)
- "Meen Yishtary El-Ward Minni" (Who Will But Flowers From Me?) from Laila (1942)
- "El-Habib" (The Lover) from Laila (1942)
- "Hagabt Noorak Anny" (You've Hidden Your Light From Me) from Laila (1942)
- "Elli fi Albo Haga Yis'alny" (Whoever Has Something In Their Heart, Tell Me) from Laila, Daughter of the Poor (1945)
- "Leila Gameelah" (What a Beautiful Night!) from Laila, Daughter of the Poor (1945)
- "Ehna El-Etnein" (The Two Of Us) from Laila, Daughter of the Poor (1945)
- "Monaya fi Korbak" (I Wish to be By Your Side) from Al-Madi Al-Majhoul (1946)
- "Enta Sa'ida" (Good Day) from Alby Dalili (1947)
- "Edhak Karkar" (Laugh and Chuckle) from Alby Dalili (1947)
- "Alby Dalili" (My Heart is My Guide) from Alby Dalili (1947)
- "Sa'alt Aleh" (I Asked About Him) from Anbar (1948)
- "Dous Al-Donya" (Step on the World) from Anbar (1948)
- "Etmakhtary Ya Kheil" (Trot, My Horse) from Ghazal El-Banat (1949)
- "El Hob Gameel" (Love Is Beautiful) from Ghazal El-Banat (1949)
- "Abgad Hawaz" (The ABC's) from Ghazal el-Banat (1949)
- "Einy Betref" (My Eye Wanders) a duet with the Egyptian actor "Naguib AlRaihani", from Ghazal El-Banat (1949)
- "El Donya Ghenwa" (The World is a Song) from Ghazal el-Banat (1949)
- "Ya Msafer W Nasy Hawak" (Traveller, You Have Forgotten Your Heart) from Shati' Al-Gharam (1950)
- "El-Maya Wel Hawa" (The Water and the Wind) from Shati' Al-Gharam (1950)
- "Ya Aaz Min Einy" (Dearer Than My Eyes) from Shati' Al-Gharam (1950)
- "Hakak Alaya" (It's My Fault) from Habib Al-Rouh (1951)
- "Es'al Alaya" (Ask About Me) from Al-Hayat Al-Hob (1954)
- "Otlob Enaya" (Ask for my Eyes) from Al-Hayat Al-Hob (1954)
- "Leh Khaletni Ahebbak" (Why Did You Let Me Love You) from Al-Habib Al-Majhoul (1955)
- "Bil Nizam Wal-Amal Wal-Etihad" (With Order, Work, and Unity) (1953) An anthem for the Egyptian Revolution that was commissioned by the new government led by President Mohamed Naguib. This song was banned when Gemal Abdelnasser ousted Naguib.
- "Sanatein W Ana Ahayel Feek" (For Two Years I've Waited For You)

== Filmography ==
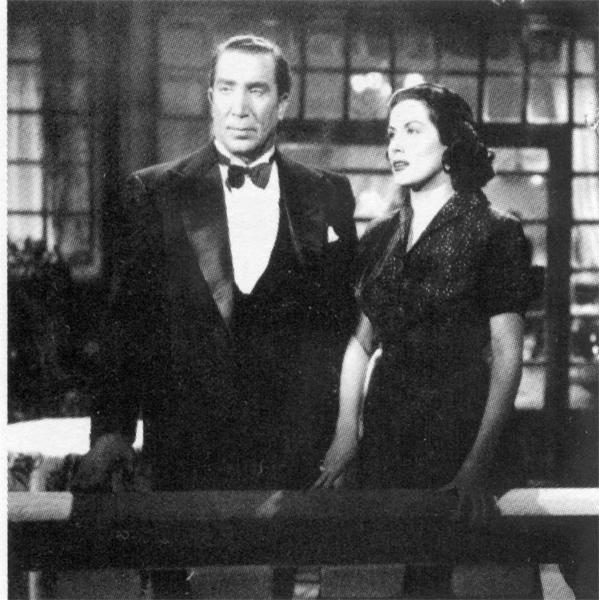
Layla with Youssef Wahbi.

Laila Mourad has starred in 27 film between 1938 and 1955. This list does not include her appearance in El-Dahaya (The Victims) (1935) in which she only recorded songs for the film, but did not actually appear in it.

Name	English Translation	Co-Star	Release date	Director
Yahya El-Hob	Viva Love!	Mohammed Abdel Wahab	January 24, 1938	Mohammed Karim
Fi Laila Momtera	On a Rainy Night	Youssef Wahbi	October 12, 1939	Togo Mizrahi
Laila Bint Elreef	Laila the Village Girl	Youssef Wahbi	January 2, 1941	Togo Mizrahi
Laila Bint Madares	Laila the Schoolgirl	Youssef Wahbi	October 16, 1941	Togo Mizrahi
Laila	Laila (Dame of the Camelias)	Hussein Sidky	April 2, 1942	Togo Mizrahi
Laila fil Zalam	Laila in the Dark	Hussein Sidky	February 24, 1944	Togo Mizrahi
Shohada'a Al-Gharam	Martyrs of Love	Ibrahim Hammouda	October 19, 1944	Kamal Selim
Laila Bint El-Foqara'a	Laila, Daughter of the Poor	Anwar Wagdi	November 5, 1945	Anwar Wagdi
Laila Bint El-Aghniya	Laila, Daughter of the Rich	Anwar Wagdi	October 28, 1946	Anwar Wagdi
Almadi Almajhoul	Unknown Past	Ahmad Salem	April 8, 1946	Ahmad Salem
Darbat Al-Qadr	Stroke of Luck	Youssef Wahbi	January 13, 1947	Youssef Wahbi
Khatem Suleiman	Suleiman's Ring	Zaki Rostom	February 17, 1947	Hassan Ramzy
Shadiat Al-Wady	Songstress of the Valley	Youssef Wahbi	April 7, 1947	Youssef Wahbi
Alby Dalili	My Heart is My Guide	Anwar Wagdi	October 6, 1947	Anwar Wagdi
Alhawa Wal Shabab	Love and Youth	Anwar Wagdi	January 5, 1948	Niazi Mostafa
Anbar	Lady Anbar	Anwar Wagdi	November 1, 1948	Anwar Wagdi
Al-Majnuna	The Madwoman	Mohamed Fawzi	January 31, 1949	Helmy Rafla
Ghazal al-Banat	The Flirtation of Girls	Naguib el-Rihani	September 22, 1949	Anwar Wagdi
Shati' Al-Gharam	The Shore of Love	Hussein Sidky	February 20, 1950	Henry Barakat
Adam wa Hawa'a	Adam and Eve	Hussein Sidky	May 7, 1951	Hussein Sidky
Habib Al-Rouh	Soulmate	Anwar Wagdi	October 8, 1951	Anwar Wagdi
Ward Al-Gharam	Flowers of Love	Mohamed Fawzi	December 10, 1951	Henry Barakat
Min Al-Qalb Lal-Qalb	Heart to Heart	Kamal el-Shennawi	February 26, 1952	Henry Barakat
Sayidat Al-Qitar	Lady of the Train	Yehia Chahine	August 28, 1952	Youssef Chahine
Bint El-Akaber	Daughter of the Great	Anwar Wagdi	February 9, 1953	Anwar Wagdi
Al-Hayat Al-Hob	Life is Love	Yehia Chahine	April 5, 1954	Seifeddine Shawkat
Al-Habib Al-Majhoul	The Unknown Lover	Hussein Sidky	May 23, 1955	Hassan Al-Saify

== Legacy ==
The Ramadan television series " Ana Albi Dalili " (named after one of her songs), about the life of Leila Mourad, debuted in 2009. It is an Egyptian production headed by Syrian director Muhamad Zuhair Rajab. Jordanian actress Safa Sultan plays Leila Mourad. Egypt's Ahmed Falawkas portrays Anwar Wagdi. Ezzat Abou Aouf, an Egyptian actor, portrays Zaki Mourad and Egyptian actress Hala Fakher portrays Miriam, the aunt of Leila Mourad.
