= Amina (1951 film) =

- Directed by: Goffredo Alessandrini
- Starring: Assia Noris
- Production company: Alessandrini Film
- Release date: 1951
- Running time: 94 minutes
- Country: Egypt
- Language: Arabic

Amina (Arabic: أمينة) is a 1951 Egyptian film directed by Goffredo Alessandrini and starring Assia Noris, Youssef Wahby and Rushdy Abaza.

== Cast ==
- Assia Noris
- Youssef Wahby
- Rushdy Abaza
- Samiha Tawfik
- Seraj Munir

== Bibliography ==
- Moliterno, Gino. Historical Dictionary of Italian Cinema. Scarecrow Press, 2008.
