= The Flirtation of Girls =

1949 film by Anwar Wagdi

Ghazal Al Banat
- غزل البنات
- Directed by: Anwar Wagdi
- Written by: Anwar Wagdi (story and script); Badie' Khayri and Naguib el-Rihani (dialogue)
- Starring: Naguib el-Rihani; Leila Mourad; Anwar Wagdi; Mohammed Abdel Wahab; Suleiman Naguib; Youssef Wahbi; Farid Shawqi; Mahmoud el-Meliguy; Zeinat Sedki; Ferdoos Mohammed; Abdel Waress Assar
- Cinematography: Abdelhalim Nasr
- Edited by: Kamal El Sheikh
- Music by: Mohammed Abdel Wahab
- Production company: United Film Company (Wagdi’s studio)
- Release date: September 22, 1949
- Running time: 110
- Country: Egypt
- Language: Arabic

Anwar Wagdi Naguib el-Rihani Mohammed Abdel Wahab Youssef Wahbi Leila Mourad

Ghazal Al Banat (Arabic: غزل البنات, English: The Flirtation of Girls) is a 1949 Egyptian film. It is Naguib Al Rihani's last film and was shown in cinemas after his death. Ghazal Al Banat was also the last appearance of Mohamed Abdel Wahab in film. The film was produced by Anwar Wagdi, who was married to the female lead, Laila Mourad. The film also featured the first on-screen appearance of Hind Rostom, age 18 at the time, in a minor role as one of Laila's friends in the opening scene. However, Rostom was replaced in future scenes with Laila's friends because the producer felt she looked too young to be in Laila's friend group.

The movie was chosen by critics among the nine best 100 films in the history of Egyptian cinema in 1996 poll.

== Background ==
The film was initially conceived of when Laila Mourad and Naguib Rihani ran into each other in the elevator where they lived. Though they had both been fans and admirers of one another's work, they had not worked together yet. Rihani suggested that they work on a movie together, and Mourad brought this information to her then-husband Anwar Wagdi, who began working on the scenario immediately.

Though there was intent to attach Mohammed Abdel Wahab as a star to the movie, he had retired from acting. Laila Mourad insisted on having him appear in the movie and compose the music for it. Abdel Wahab conceded to appear in the movie in a non-acting role as himself, where he sang one song. He also agreed to compose all the songs of the movie.

== Plot ==
Laila (Laila Mourad), daughter of the wealthy Mourad Pasha (Suleiman Naguib), is struggling to pass her high school Arabic language class. Marzouk Afandy (Abdel Warres Assar), who is one of many servants working for the Pasha proposes to bring his friend, a poor, recently fired Arabic language elementary school teacher to tutor Laila. Laila flirts with the older teacher in an attempt to avoid studying, however, she is unaware that Mr. Hamam took her advances seriously and fell in love with her. In the end Mr. Hamam, in a spirited debate with Youssef Wahby, and after listening to Mohamed Abdel Wahab's musical piece on letting go of your true love, he understands that Laila had not loved him in the first place, and that though he truly did love her, it would be selfish of him to imposes his love on her. He finally agrees to let her go and be with her true love, Wahid (Anwar Wagdi).

== Detailed plot description ==
Laila (Laila Mourad), daughter of the wealthy Mourad Pasha (Suleiman Naguib), is a carefree college girl who loves to sing, dance, (Etmakhtary Ya Kheil/Trot, my Horse) spend time with her friends, and her bad-boy boyfriend Anwar (Mahmoud el-Meliguy). News reaches Mourad Pasha's secretary, Marzouk Afandi (Abdel Wares Assar), that Laila had failed her Arabic class, and presents this information to the Pasha while also offering a solution: Marzouk knows an excellent Arabic tutor.

Mr. Hamam (Naguib Rihani) is a down-on-his-luck teacher, fired from the school he works at after a prank that his students set up for him accidentally blows up in the principal's face. Marzouk Afandi meets Hamam at the school and presents Mr. Hamam the offer to tutor Laila, daughter of Mourad Pasha. Hamam, having just been fired, has no choice but to agree.

Mr. Hamam visits Mourad Pasha's house, and mistakes Yassin, the coffeemaker, for the Pasha, then mistakes Suleiman, the dog groomer, as the Pasha again, before he meets Laila, who indirectly accuses him of hiding a diamond bracelet that she had misplaced. In his frustration at these events, Hamam lashes out at the Pasha, not knowing who he is, and gets dismissed. However, before he leaves, Laila finds the missing bracelet, and feels some remorse for what happened to Hamam. She apologizes to him, and convinces her father to hire him anyway. Mourad Pasha concedes, and Mr. Hamam is given quarters at Mourad Pasha's house to stay while he tutors Laila.

The next day, Laila is excited to see Mr. Hamam, freshly shaven and dressed in a brand new suit (Abgad Hawaz/Lorem Ipsum). As they begin studying, Laila is only interested in flirtatiously asking Mr. Hamam questions about his personal life, before she gets a call from her boyfriend Anwar, and skips the rest of her time with Hamam.

The day after, Laila meets Mr. Hamam at his room to continue her studies. Laila informs Mr. Hamam that she wants him to drop the formalities with her, and that she wants him to dine with her and the Pasha from now on. He expresses his gratitude for the treatment he's received from her and the household so far. Hamam tells Laila about how he has hated the world for how it has mistreated him, and she tells him he has to love the world for it to love him back (El Donya Ghenwa/The World is a Song). Hamam is flustered by the romantic undertones of Laila's song, and tries to get back to focusing on Laila's studies, to her disappointment.

That night, Laila, on the phone with Anwar, tells him she has not been able to see him due to her Arabic studies, as her father insists on her doing the make-up exam. As she hangs up, she sings of her love for Anwar (El Hob Gamil/Love is Beautiful). Hamam hears Laila's singing from across the yard, and believes she is singing to him. He crosses to her room, before realizing that he is making a mistake and deciding to go back. Laila insists on him staying to keep her company. As they get to talking, Laila's nanny, the Dada (Ferdous Mohammed) enters her room. Hamam hides in time, and Laila sends her away to get water. Hamam sneezes, and startles the Dada. Laila tells her it's just the dog, Jimmy. Hamam insists on leaving, but Laila doesn't want him to catch a cold, so she goes looking for him to wear some shoes to wear. As she goes, the Dada comes back, and Hamam hides in Laila's bed. The Dada starts to tickle and play with Hamam, thinking it's Laila, until she uncovers the bedsheet, and starts yelling for help. Mourad Pasha rushes to Laila's room, gun in hand. As he knocks on the door, Laila, having returned, tells him she's in the bathroom. The Dada answers the door for Mourad Pasha, telling him she hadn't heard or seen anything, and the Laila is in the bathroom bathing Jimmy the dog. In the bathroom, Laila is scolding "Jimmy" while Mr. Hamam is in the tub, with an umbrella open, making barking sounds.

The next day, Hamam packs his belongings and is ready to leave, feeling that his love with Laila is too strong for him to be able to continue to tutor her, and in light of the events of the night before. Laila catches him and is upset, pleading with him to stay. She tells him that she will not be staying here either, and at 10 o'clock, they will both run away. Laila meets Mr. Hamam by the car, where he tells her that he thinks this is a terrible idea. He refuses to go with her. Laila threatens to call for her father unless Hamam gets in the car with her. In the car, Hamam wonders where Laila is taking him, while Laila teases him (Eainy Betref/My Eye Wanders).

They arrive at a cabaret, where Laila rushes to see her boyfriend, Anwar, leaving Mr. Hamam at the door by himself. As Anwar and Laila share a table and champagne, Mr. Hamam realizes he has been used, and prepares to leave the cabaret. However, he overhears people talking about Anwar and how he is a gold digger, having recently dumped a rich girl like Laila, after getting a few fancy gifts from her. Hearing this, Hamam goes to Laila and Anwar's table, flips it over and tries to forcefully take Laila, before the cabaret security kick him out. Hamam tries this another time, however, the second time, he finds a man in army uniform (Anwar Wagdi), and pleads for his help. Hamam asks Wahid the pilot to enter the cabaret with him and take Laila out of there on the pretense that he is her cousin, and that she has smeared the family name by being here. Wahid, seeing Laila and hearing her laugh, falls in love with her. He and Hamam witness her sing of her love to Anwar (Ma Lish Amal/I Have No Hope). However, before they can intervene, Anwar's ex-girlfriend, Hikma (Zeinat Sidki), charges at the couple, accusing Anwar of dating her for her money and claiming that the suit he is wearing was bought for him by her. As Hika violently confronts Anwar and Laila, Wahid and Hamam finally decide to intervene. Laila denies that Wahid is her cousin and refuses to go with him. Anwar threatens to fight anyone who tries to take Laila, but Wahid knocks him out with a single punch, and takes Laila away.

In the car, Wahid and Hamam confront Laila about her behavior at the cabaret, and Wahid apologizes for hitting Laila. Though Laila is upset at both of them, she takes a liking for Wahid. He asks if she is taken, and before she answers, Hamam says she isn't. Laila corrects him, and tells Wahid that she isn't taken after all. At this point, Hamam stops the car, a few blocks away from Laila's house, and enters the nearest house, hoping to send Wahid away. After ringing the doorbell, the servant who answers the door drags Laila and Hamam in, threatening to call the police on them for their alleged scam. However, the master of the house, Egyptian legend Youssef Wahbe, dismisses the servants, fascinated by the pair of Hamam and Laila. Star struck, the pair sit with him and fabricate a situation to explain why they ended up at his house. Laila claims that they are hiding at his house because they committed murder. As the pair insist on leaving, they are informed that Mohammed Abdel Wahab is at Wahbe's house as well, working on a song. Wahbe invites them to stay and listen, as he and Abdel Wahab are working on a piece, in which someone learns that to truly love someone, they must let them go, finding satisfaction and joy in the other person's happiness. The relation between this premise and Hamam's feelings for Laila are not lost on Hamam, who says this story is silly. Abdel Wahab starts his song, and all three of them listen in (Habib el Rouh/Soul Mate).

Hamam is overcome with emotion from the song, understanding that as someone who truly loves Laila, the circumstances for them being together are unlikely, and that he must let her go to find someone more age appropriate to love. Laila, seeing Hamam storm away in tears, understands from Youssef Wahbe that Hamam truly loves her. She goes after him, feeling remorseful for having led him on. However, Hamam is grateful for Laila's love, telling her that it taught him how to love life. Laila and Wahid insist on taking Mr. Hamam's blessing before they pursue their love, insisting that they cannot build their happiness over his. Hamam gives them his blessing, but tells them they must arrive at Mourad Pasha's house before he wakes up. As they drive home, Hamam recalls the song "Soul Mate", having accepted that, in truly loving Laila, he had let her go.

== Cast ==
- Naguib Al Rihani as Mr. Hamam
- Laila Mourad as Laila
- Anwar Wagdi as Wahid Safwat
- Suleiman Naguib as Mourad Pasha
- Mahmoud el-Meliguy as Anwar
- Ferdoos Mohammed as the maid
- Abdel Waress Assar as Marzouk Afandy, Mourad Pasha's secretary
- Zeinat Sedki as Anwar's ex girlfriend
- Stephan Rosti as Owner of the Cabaret
- Said Abu Bakr as Suleiman, one of Mourad Pasha's servants
- Abdelhamid Zaki: Headmaster
- Abdelmajid Shoukry: Yassin bin Makhdoom, the Pasha’s coffee server
- Farid Shawki: Cabaret attendant
- Fouad al-Rashidi: Pasha’s dog servant
- Abdelmonem Ismail: school janitor
- Youssef Wahby as himself
- Mohamed Abdel Wahab as himself
- Nabila El Sayed: as a student
- Hind Rostom: as Laila's friend

== Score ==
Songs
Title	Sung by	Words by	Music by
إتمختري يا خيل (“Trot, My Horse”)	Leila Mourad	Hussein al-Sayed	Mohamed Abdel Wahab
أبجد هوز (“Lorem Ipsum”)	Leila Mourad	Hussein al-Sayed	Mohamed Abdel Wahab
الدنيا غنوة (“The World Is a Song”)	Leila Mourad	Hussein al-Sayed	Mohamed Abdel Wahab
الحب جميل (“Love Is Beautiful”)	Leila Mourad	Hussein al-Sayed	Mohamed Abdel Wahab
عيني بترف (“My Eye Wanders”)	Naguib el-Rihani and Leila Mourad	Hussein al-Sayed	Mohamed Abdel Wahab
ما ليش أمل (“I Have No Hope”)	Leila Mourad	Hussein al-Sayed	Mohamed Abdel Wahab
عاشق الروح (“Soul Mate”)	Mohammed Abdel Wahab	Hussein al-Sayed	Mohamed Abdel Wahab
