= Life or Death (film) =

- حياة أو موت
- Directed by: Kamal El Sheikh
- Written by: Ali El-Zarqani
- Produced by: Lotus Film (Asia and Associates)
- Starring: Emad Hamdy; Madiha Yousri; Youssef Wahby
- Cinematography: Ahmed Khurshid
- Release date: December 6, 1954
- Running time: 108 minutes
- Country: Egypt
- Language: Egyptian Arabic

Life or Death (Arabic: حياة أو موت, romanized: Ḥayāh aw Mawt) is a 1954 Egyptian film directed by Kamal El Sheikh. It was entered into the 1955 Cannes Film Festival.

== Synopsis ==
The film talks about the story of a man who is sick with the heart, so he sends his daughter to come to you with treatment and to cure the one who is in a hurry, but the person who gave his daughter the medicine discovers that this medicine contains a deadly poison because of the wrong composition of the medicine.

== Cast ==
- Emad Hamdi
- Youssef Wahby
- Madiha Yousri
- Hussein Riad: played the role of (pharmacist)
- Rushdi Abaza: played the role of (police officer)
- Duha Amir: played the role of (the child Samira)
- Adly Kasseb: played the role of (officer)
- Ahmed Al-Haddad: He played the role of (from whom the ring was stolen)
- Ezzedine Shaker

== Reception ==
The film has been included in the 2006 Bibliotheca Alexandrina's 100 Greatest Egyptian Films.
