= Lady Anbar =

- عنبر
- Directed by: Anwar Wagdi
- Starring: Anwar Wagdi; Laila Mourad; Ismail Yassine; Elias Moadab; Mahmoud Shokoko; Zeinat Sedki; Aziz Othman; Stephan Rosti; Bishara Wakim; Hassan Fayek; Sayed Abu Bakr; Farid Shawqi; Reyad El Kasabgy; Abdel Waress Assar
- Production company: United Film Company (Wagdi’s studio)
- Release date: 1948
- Country: Egypt
- Language: Arabic

Lady Anbar (Arabic: عنبر, lit. “Anbar”) is an Egyptian musical comedy film starring Laila Mourad and Anwar Wagdi. Alongside Wagdi and Mourad, the latter of whom sings the signature number, "اللي يقدر على قلبي" (“Who Can Hold My Heart?”), the movie stars Ismail Yassine, Aziz Othman, Mahmoud Shokoko, and Elias Moadab.

== Songs ==
Most of the film's songs feature lyrics by Hussein Al-Sayed Al-Azab and music by Mohammed Abdel Wahab. The exception is the traditional muwashshah (a sonnet-like form), "ملا الكاسات وسقاني" (lit.: “Fill My Glass with Rain”).

== Bibliography ==
- Kassem, Mahmoud. موسوعة الأفلام الروائية في مصر والعالم العربي (“Arabic Movies Encyclopedia”), vol. 2. Cairo: General Egyptian Book Organization, 2006.
