= Giovanni Martinelli =

Italian operatic tenor (1885–1969)

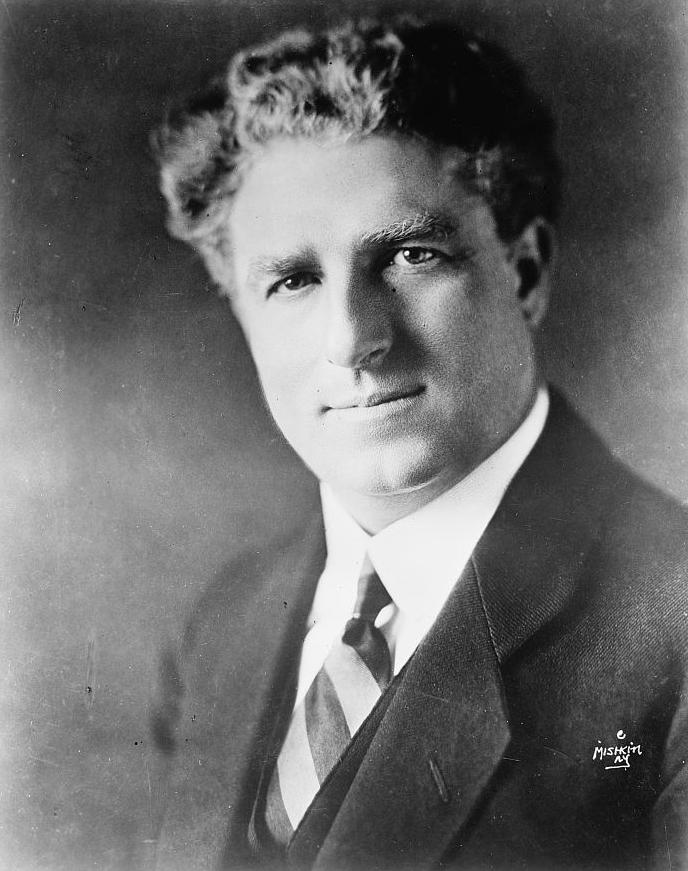
Giovanni Martinelli

Giovanni Martinelli (22 October 1885 – 2 February 1969) was an Italian operatic spinto tenor. He was associated with the Italian lyric-dramatic repertory, although he performed French operatic roles to great acclaim as well. Martinelli was one of the most famous tenors of the 20th century, enjoying a long career at the Metropolitan Opera in New York City and appearing at other major international theatres.

== Biography and career ==
Giovanni Martinelli as Pollione in Norma (photo with 1955 dedication)

Martinelli was born 22 October 1885 in Montagnana, Province of Padua, Veneto in the Kingdom of Italy. After service as a clarinetist in a military band, he studied with Giuseppe Mandolini in Milan, and made his first operatic appearance in 1908 as the messenger in Aida. On 29 December 1910, Martinelli made his professional debut at the Teatro dal Verme in Ernani.

On 12 June 1911, Martinelli debuted in Rome as Dick Johnson in La fanciulla del West; he would continue singing in that role elsewhere in Italy including La Scala in 1912. Martinelli made his London debut at the Royal Opera House as Cavaradossi in Tosca on 22 April 1912. Martinelli's debut at the Metropolitan Opera took place 20 November 1913, as Rodolfo in La Bohème, where the young tenor's easy high C and pure, silvery tone attracted favorable attention; he was a Met mainstay for 32 seasons, with 926 performances of 36 roles, appearing most often as Radames in Aida; Otello; Manrico in Il trovatore; Don Alvaro in La forza del destino; Calaf in Turandot and Dick Johnson in La fanciulla del West; but also as Arnold in Guglielmo Tell; Eleazar in La Juive; Enzo in La Gioconda; Don Jose in Carmen; Vasco de Gama in L'Africaine; Canio in Pagliacci; Pollione in Norma. He also sang in Boston, San Francisco and Chicago, often trying out new roles there, before singing them at the Met.

Outside the United States, Martinelli appeared in Paris and Buenos Aires during his prime but – oddly enough – his native Italy did not hear him at his peak. In 1937, he returned to London to sing at the Covent Garden in highly acclaimed performances of Otello and as Calaf, opposite the exceptionally powerful English dramatic soprano Eva Turner. Martinelli retired from the stage in 1950, although he gave one final performance in 1967 – at the age of 81 – as Emperor Altoum in Turandot, in Seattle. During retirement he taught singing in New York, where one of his pupils was tenor Jack Harrold.

Martinelli was essentially a spinto tenor of steely brilliance, commanding a strong high C; his rigorously controlled technique gave him exceptional breath control, although it did not eschew some occasional tightness and squeezing out of notes, particularly during the later phase of his career.

In 1945, Martinelli retired from singing on stage but continued to make occasional appearances at charity recitals. Martinelli sang as Samson in Philadelphia in 1950 and as the emperor in a Seattle concert of Turandot in 1967.

Martinelli died 2 February 1969, aged 83, at Roosevelt Hospital in New York City.

== Personal life ==
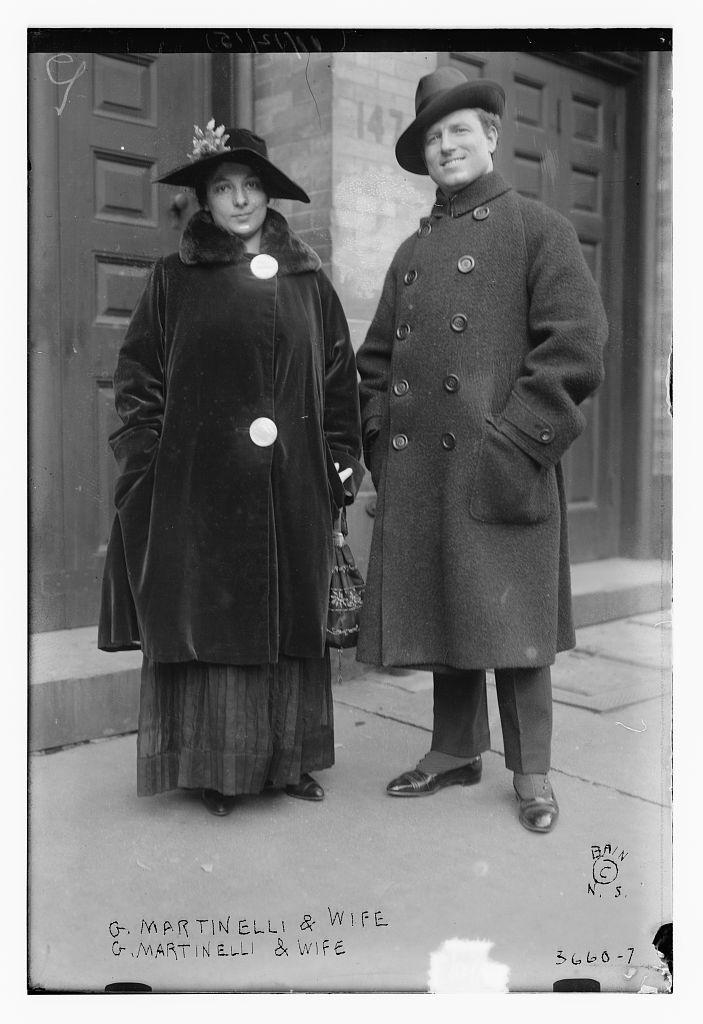
Giovanni Martinelli and his wife, Adele, at the Metropolitan Opera on 12 November 1915.

In private life Martinelli was said to be something of a playboy, possessing a charming personality, a wealth of memorable anecdotes and an impressive head of hair that grew silver with age. He was married to Adele Previtali (d. 1980) from 7 August 1913 until his death; they had three children: Bettina (born 1915), Antonio (born 1917), and Giovanna (born 1926). Soprano Colette D'Arville was his lover during the 1930s and 1940s.

His sense of humour was notorious, as was his criticism of other singers. Once, after listening to a baritone bellow the title role of Otello, he quipped "he sings it like a truck driver." A friend asked him what he thought of a famous American singer who also did the role. "Ah, now, he sings it like the truck".

== Recordings ==
Giovanni Martinelli, Tenor of the N.Y. Metropolitan Opera Company in "Vesti la giubba" from the Opera "I Pagliacci" by Leoncavallo (1926)

Martinelli made a large number of commercial recordings for Edison and the Victor Talking Machine Company/RCA Victor by the acoustic and electrical processes which are available on LP and CD reissues. Some feature other great Met singers of Martinelli's day, with whom he sang, include the sopranos Frances Alda, Geraldine Farrar and Rosa Ponselle, contralto Louise Homer, baritones Giuseppe De Luca and Lawrence Tibbett, and the bass Ezio Pinza.

Transcription recordings were made of some of his live performances, including a 1935 concert of Beethoven's Missa Solemnis with Arturo Toscanini and the New York Philharmonic Orchestra (which also featured Elisabeth Rethberg, Marion Telva, and Ezio Pinza, broadcast by CBS), a 1939 performance of Verdi's Simon Boccanegra by the Metropolitan Opera, also with Rethberg and Pinza (broadcast by NBC), and various Otellos from the 1930s onwards—including a 1941 version with Lawrence Tibbett, Stella Roman, and Alessio de Paolis, under Ettore Panizza. Some of these transcriptions have been issued on LP and CD.

On 6 August 1926, Martinelli appeared in a Vitaphone short film, singing "Vesti la giubba" from Pagliacci, one of eight short films shown before the Warner Brothers feature film Don Juan starring John Barrymore.

Several episodes of a DuMont TV series hosted by him called Opera Cameos (1953–55) are in the collection of the Paley Center for Media.

== Sources ==
- D. Hamilton, ed. (1987). The Metropolitan Opera Encyclopedia: A Complete Guide to the World of Opera. New York: Simon and Schuster. ISBN 0-671-61732-X.
- Roland Mancini and Jean-Jacques Rouveroux, (orig. H. Rosenthal and J. Warrack, French edition), Guide de l'opéra, Les indispensables de la musique (Fayard, 1995). ISBN 2-213-59567-4
- Harold Rosenthal and John Warrack, The Concise Oxford Dictionary of Opera, second edition, (Oxford University Press, London, 1980).
- J. B. Steane, The Grand Tradition (Duckworth, London, 1974).
