= Here's Howe =

1928 two-act musical

Here's Howe! is a musical in two acts with music by Roger Wolfe Kahn and Joseph Meyer and lyrics by Irving Caesar. The swing music standard "Crazy Rhythm" was written for this show. The work's musical book was written by Fred Thompson and Paul Gerard Smith. The musical is set mainly in Boston, Massachusetts at the Tredwell Motor Company where the play's central characters work; but with additional scenes in Havana, Cuba when the characters take a trip abroad.

== Productions ==
The musical premiered at the Shubert Theatre in Boston on April 23, 1928, for a week of tryout performances.

The work opened on Broadway at the Broadhurst Theatre on May 1, 1928, and was produced by Alex. A. Aarons and Vinton Freedley with Paul Lannin serving as musical director; Sammy Lee as choreographer; costumes designed by Kiviette; and scenic designs by John Wenger. It closed after 71 performances on June 30, 1928.

Time magazine called the Broadway production one "for fun-loving rovers".

== Cast ==
The production marked the American debut of French soprano and actress Colette D'Arville as Claudette Pernier. Other leading performers in the show included William Frawley as Toplis, Ben Bernie as Dan Dabney, Eric Blore as Sir Basil Carraway, Irene Delroy as Joyce Baxter, Peggy Chamberlain as Cora Bibby, Allen Kearns as Billy Howe, Helen Carrington as Toni Treadwell, Ross Himes as Mr. Petrie, and Dillon Ober as Wilbur.

== Musical numbers ==
=== Act l ===
- "Dismissal Whistle" (Cora and Employees)
- "Beauty in the Movies" (Edwin, Mary, and Girls)
- "Life as a Twosome" (Joyce, Billy, and Ensemble)
- "Crazy Rhythm" (Dan, Cora, Mary, and Ensemble)
- "Imagination" (Joyce and Billy)
- "Specialty (a)" (Dan Danny and Orchestra)
- "Dance (b)" (Cora and Petrie)
- "Dance (c)" (Joyce)
- "Finale"

=== Act ll ===
- "Opening" (Ensemble)
- "I'd Rather Dance Here Than Hereafter" (Cora, Petrie, and Ensemble)
- "Here's Howe" (Billy and Girls)
- "A New Love" (Joyce and Girls)
- "Finaletto"
- "Specialty" (Pelham)
- "Boston Post Road" (Billy and Helpers)
- "Finale" (company)
