= Leon Angel =

Egyptian actor (1900 – 1973)

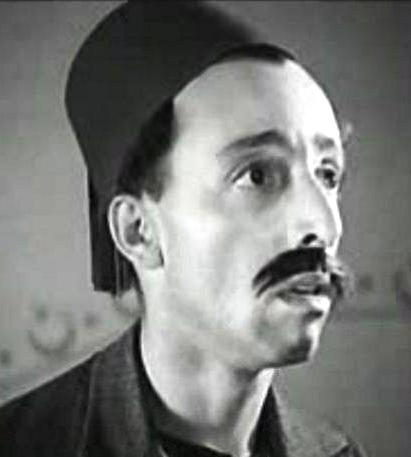
- Leon Angel portraying the character Chalom in 1937
- Born: 15 May 1900; Alexandria
- Died: 12 July 1973

Leon Angel (15 May 1900 – 12 July 1973), usually credited as simply Leon, was an Egyptian actor best known for his work in the 1930s. He appeared in a series of Muslim–Jewish buddy films in which he played a comic Jewish character. Among Jews of Egypt involved in the Egyptian film industry, Leon was the only Jewish star to headline an Egyptian film while portraying a Jewish character. He later emigrated to Australia, where he was involved in establishing the country's first Sephardic synagogue.

== Early life and career ==
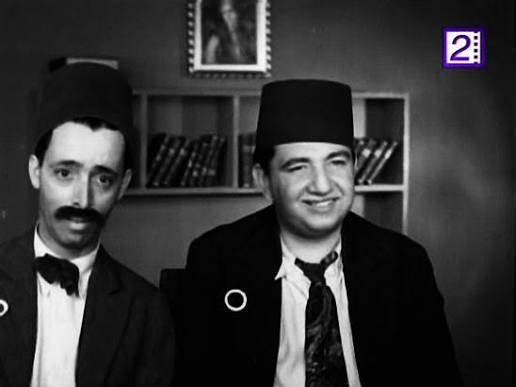
The double act "Leon and Abdou".

Leon was born on 15 May 1900 in Alexandria, Egypt, to Olga Piperno and Victor Angelou, who were of Greek-Jewish descent. His father smuggled hashish along the Nile and left the family impoverished, requiring Leon to work from a young age to help support them.

Leon had no prior acting experience when he began collaborating with Togo Mizrahi in 1930 on a screenplay for a feature film about the dangers of drug use. He drew on his family's experiences while writing the script. The resulting film, Cocaine, The Abyss, premiered in Alexandria on 19 November 1930.

Leon introduced his signature character, Chalom, in Mizrahi's silent film 05001 (1932). Chalom was portrayed as a poor Jewish man trying to make ends meet through itinerant jobs, including selling lottery tickets and operating a food cart. The character's working-class background appealed to Egyptian audiences who frequented third-tier cinemas. Chalom also represented Egyptian Jewish nativeness at a time of uncertainty for Jews in Egypt.

In The Two Delegates (1934) and Mistreated by Affluence (1937), Chalom appeared alongside a Muslim sidekick named 'Abdu. Through their friendship and the close relations depicted between other Jewish and Muslim characters, the films promoted a culture of coexistence.

Leon also directed two films in which he reprised the role of Chalom: Chalom the Dragoman (1935) and The Athlete (1937), the latter co-directed with Clément Mizrahi.

He studied civil engineering through a correspondence course in France and married fellow Alexandria native Esther Cohen. Cohen appeared under the screen name 'Adalat and was often cast as Chalom's love interest.

Leon retired from cinema in 1937. He later emigrated to Australia with his family. In 1965, he was involved in founding the Sephardic Association of Victoria, which established what has been described as the first Sephardic synagogue in Australia. Leon Angel died in Melbourne, Australia, on 12 July 1973.
