= Elias Moadab =

Egyptian actor

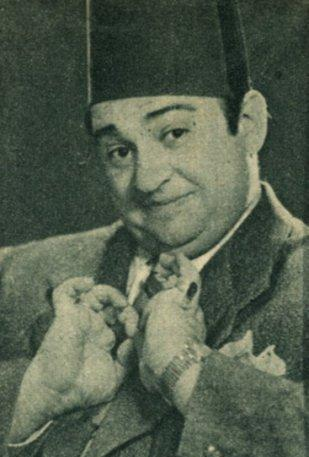
- Born: 6 February 1916
- Died: 28 May 1952 (aged 36)

Elias Moadab (6 February 1916 – 28 May 1952) was an Egyptian actor.

== Biography ==
Born to a Syrian Jewish father and Egyptian Jewish mother, in the city of Tanta. When he was four years old, the family moved to Cairo and lived in the old Jewish quarter of Cairo. He graduated from the Lycee school in 1932.

At the beginning of his career, he worked in his father's eyewear shop and repaired watches, but he soon moved into the world of entertainment and in 1944 began using the stage name Elias Moadev and began his artistic career as a singer in the famous nightclub «Elborg» where he was introduced to Bishara Wakim and Ismail Yasin, they opened the doors for him to work in the films.

Moadab made his film debut in 1947, including Habib al-Omr (Lifelong Lover) and Sittat Afirit (Women Are Fairies). He quickly became a fixture in Egyptian comedy cinema, performing in approximately 20–25 films over five years, often alongside heavyweights like Ismail Yassin, Leila Mourad, Samia Gamal, Tahiya Karioka, Shadia, and Anwar Wagd.

Moadb often played comic characters who spoke with a Shami accent, to the point that many believed he was Syrian or Lebanese, when in fact he was a native Egyptian who lived on Firah Street (Chicken Street) in the Jewish Quarter (Haret al-Yahud).

In addition to his work in film, he also appeared at several prestigious nightclubs, including "Al-Ariozna" and "Helmiyya Palace." He also made a living by performing at private events such as weddings and bar mitzvahs, for which he received high salaries.

After 1948, despite pressure from Zionist organizations to emigrate to Israel, he insisted: "Egypt is my homeland; here I was born and here I shall be buried." However, he steadfastly practiced Jewish rituals.

Suffered chronic headaches in later years, and tragically died during surgery to remove a brain tumor—just shy of his 36th birthday. Left behind a lasting cinematic legacy and was posthumously commemorated in festivals such as the Luxor Egyptian and European Film Festival as a key figure of Egyptian cinema's golden age.

== Filmography ==
- «Habib al omr» 1947 with Farid al-Atrash, Samia Gamal and Ismail Yasin.
- «Sittat afarit» 1947 with Mahmoud el-Meliguy, Mohamed Fawzi and Ismail Yasin.
- «the soul and the body» 1948 with Camelia, Mohamed Fawzi, Kamal Al-Shennawi and Shadia.
- «Amber » with Leila Mourad, Anwar Wagdi, Aziz Othman and Ismail Yasin.
- «people talk » 1949 with Shadia and Ibrahim Hamouda.
- «Mandeel El Helw » with Tahiya Karioka, Mahmoud Abdel Aziz and Marie Munib.
- «Sharei El Bahlwan» with Camelia, Ismail Yasin and Kamal Al-Shennawi.
- «Lilet El Eeed» with Ismail Yasin, Shadia and Mahmoud Choukoukou.
- «Einy Be Tref» with Tahiya Karioka, Karem Mahmoud, and Mahmoud el-Meliguy.
- «Sitt al hosn» 1950 with Samia Gamal, Leila Fawzi, Kamal Al-Shennawi, Huda Sultan and Aziz Osman.
- «Felfel» with Ismail Yasin, Lola Sedki And Magda.
- «Hero» with Ismail Yasin and Tahiya Karioka.
- «Siboni Aghani» with Sabah, Ismail Yasin and Saad Abdel-Wahab.
- «apportionment and share» with Aziza Amir, Yahya Shaheen and Tahiya Karioka.
- «Fayeq and Rayeq» 1951 with Karem Mahmoud, Ismail Yasin and Tahiya Karioka.
- «Katr El Naadah» with Shadia, Kamal Al-Shennawi and Ismail Yasin.
- «El Banat Sharbat » with Ismail Yasin, Ahlam and Siraj Munir.
- «Beet El Natash» with Shadia, Ismail Yasin and Abdel Fatah Al Kasri.
- «Halaal Aleek » with Hoda Shams El Deen, Souraya Helmy and Ismail Yasin.
- «El Sir Fe Beer» with Charanfantah, Widad Hamdi and Mahmoud Choukoukou.
- «Tiger » with Naima Akef, Zaki Rostom and Anwar Wagdi.

Actor Elias Moadab took part in many of the comedy movies with his «Shami» (Lebanese) accent that ushered into the world of comedy people like Ismail Yasin and others. It got stuck in people's head that he was Syrian or Lebanese or something like that when in reality he was full-fledged Egyptian who lived in the Jewish quarter (Haret al Yahood).

Elias, died in Cairo, 28 May 1952.
