= Salama Hegazi =

Egyptian singer (1852–1917)

and

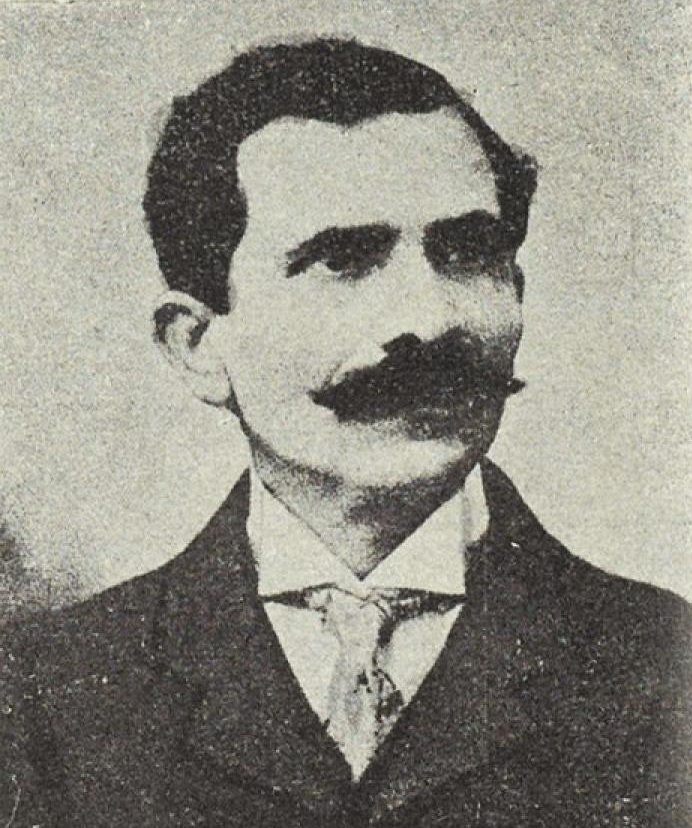
Salama Hegazi

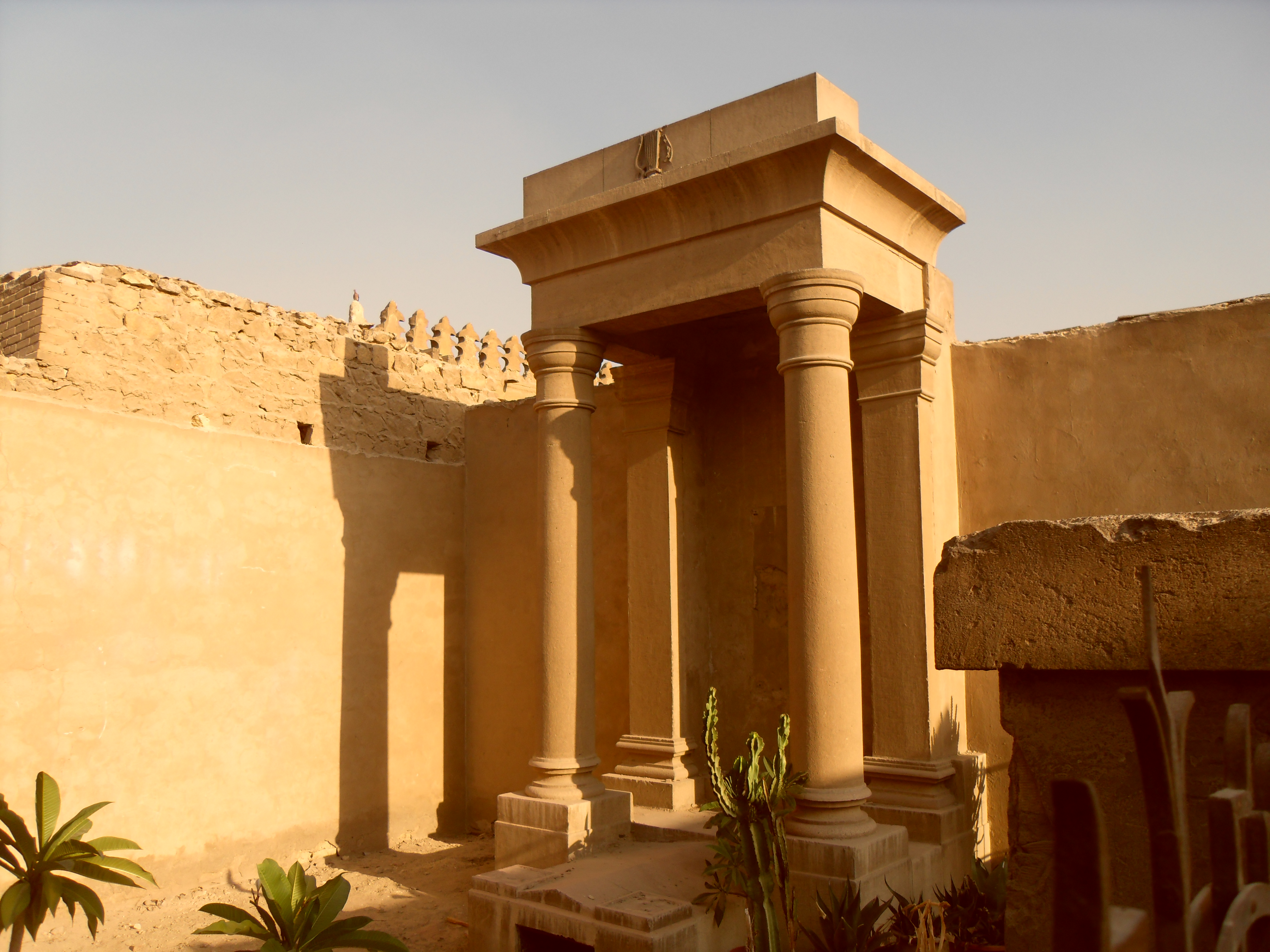
Tomb of Sheikh Salama Hegazi in Cairo

Salama Ibrahim Hegazi (Arabic: سلامة حجازي; 1852 – October 4, 1917) was an Egyptian theatre director and singer. He is known as a pioneer of musical theatre in Egypt in the second half of the 19th century.

== Life and career ==
Hegazi was locally known as El Sheikh Salama. In 1852 in Alexandria, he recited the Qur'an, after memorising the entire work.

Many famous singers in Egypt, such as Mounira El Mahdeya and Mohamed Abdel Wahab, have performed his music. He promoted Sayed Darwish, who considered him an inspiration.

In 1891 Iskandar Farah and Hegazi founded a theatre company. In 1914, with Lebanese actor George Abyad, he helped in the formation of a new group and they worked together until Salama's death in 1917. Despite being paralyzed at the end of his days, he continued to appear on stage. He has been credited with many forms of musical theatre and operetta music.

== Notable works ==
- With Iskandar Farah:
  - African
  - Talimak
  - Ataiwaq
  - King of the reservoirs
- Solo:
  - Saladin
- With George Abyad:
  - Egypt
  - The Heart of a Woman
  - Al-Hakim bi-Amr Allah
  - To the Homeland
  - Criminal Innocent
