= Sons of Aristocrats =

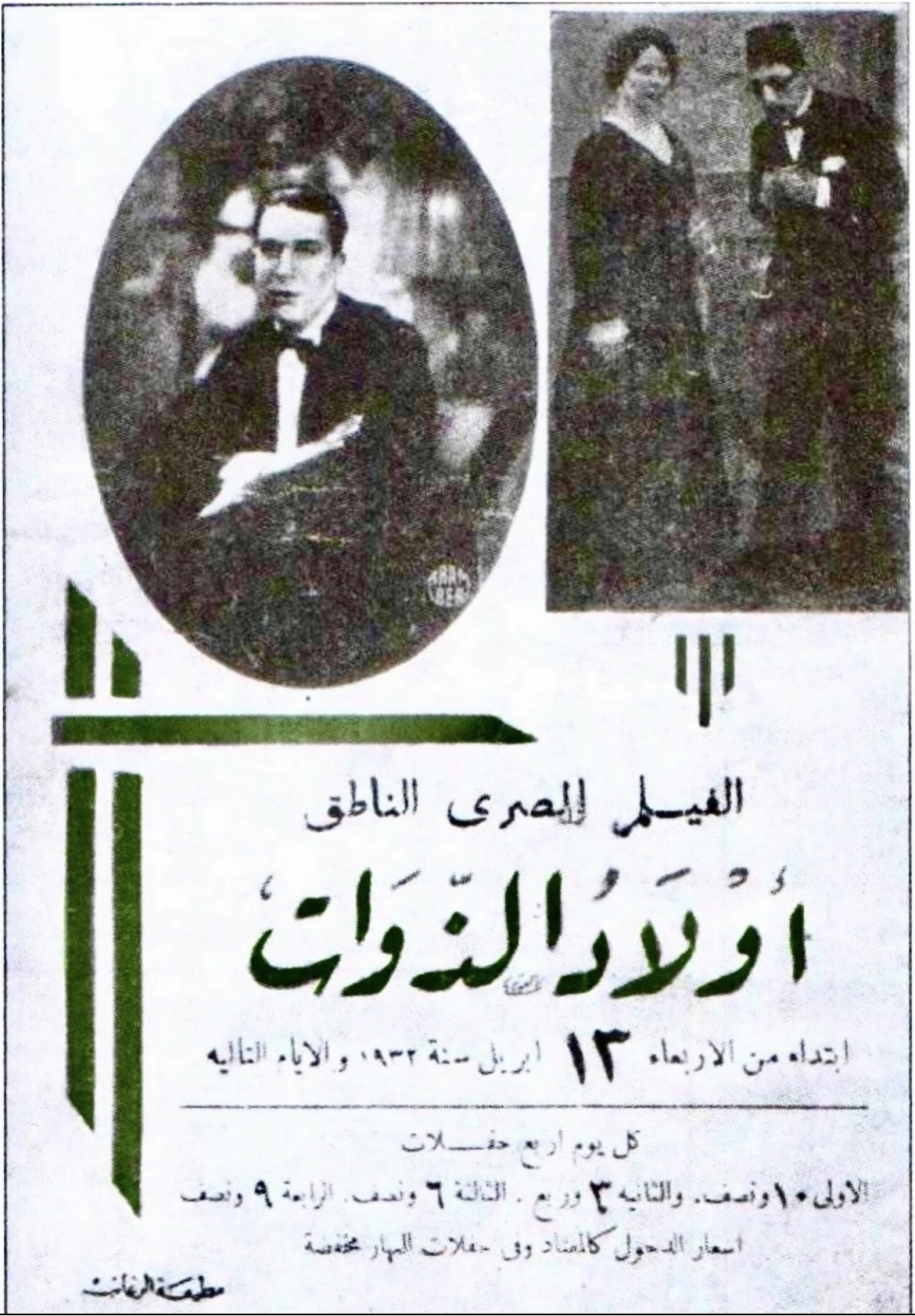
- Film poster
- Directed by: Mohammed Karim
- Written by: Mohammed Karim; Youssef Wahbi
- Produced by: Youssef Wahbi
- Starring: Youssef Wahbi; Amina Rizk
- Cinematography: Gaston Madri
- Production company: Ramses Film
- Distributed by: General Film Distributors
- Release date: 13 April 1932 (Egypt)
- Running time: 135 minutes
- Country: Egypt
- Language: Egyptian Arabic

Sons of Aristocrats (Arabic: أولاد الذوات, lit. 'Sons of the 'Haves'') is a 1932 Egyptian drama film directed by Mohammed Karim. It stars Youssef Wahbi and Amina Rizk. It is the first Egyptian sound film. The film was produced by Youssef Wahbi for Ramses Film and was released on April 12, 1932 by General Film Distributors.

== Plot ==
Hamdi Bey abandoned himself to his lust and fell in love with a French girl, leaving his wife behind him. He was surprised by that girl cheating on him with her lover, so he shot her and was sentenced to prison. After the expiration of his prison term, he decided to return to Egypt again. Hamdi Bey met his inevitable fate, committing suicide under the wheels of a train.

== Cast ==
- Youssef Wahbi
- Amina Rizk
- Rawheya Khaled
- Sirag Munir
- Anwar Wagdi
- Hassan El Baroudi
- Mansi Fahmi
- Hassan Fayek
- Badia Masabni
- Dawlat Abyad
- Colette D'Arville
- Aziza Shawqi

== See also ==
- Egyptian cinema
- List of Egyptian films of 1932
