= Colette D'Arville =

French soprano and musical theatre actress (1902–1944)

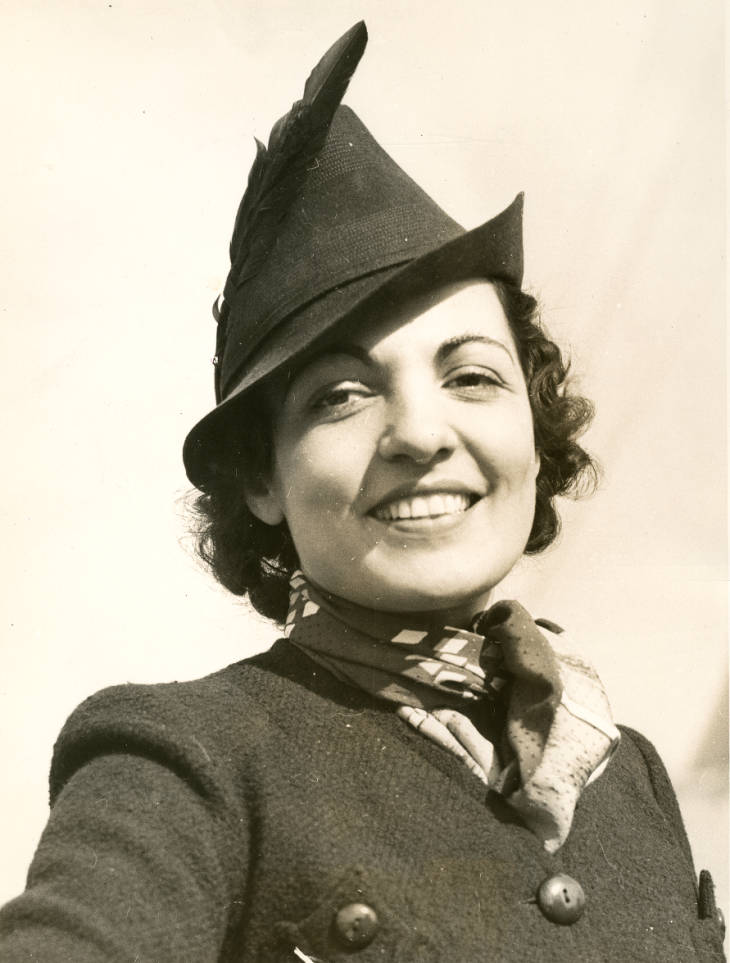
- Colette D'Arville, 1937
- Born: Marie Marthe Cescosse; 1902; French Basque Country
- Died: 16 December 1944 (aged 42); New York City, U.S.
- Other names: Colette Etchery
- Occupation: Operatic soprano

Colette D'Arville (1902 – 16 December 1944) was a French soprano and musical theatre actress who had an international career in operas, concerts, and musicals from the 1920s through the 1940s. Born Marie Marthe Cescosse, she began her career at the Théâtre des Bouffes-Parisiens from 1922 to 1927 with the stage name Colette Etchery, she changed her stage name to Colette D'Arville for her United States debut in the 1928 Broadway musical Here's Howe. She was active with the Opéra-Comique in Paris during the 1930s, and periodically appeared in operas with American companies from 1931 to 1942 in addition to performing on American radio and in concerts and recitals. She was particularly associated with the title role in Bizet's Carmen. While principally active in live performance on the stage and radio, she starred as Chichita in the 1935 musical film Tango Bar for Paramount Pictures. She was romantically involved with composer Deems Taylor and tenor Giovanni Martinelli.

== Early life and initial career as Colette Etchery ==
Colette D'Arville was born Marie Marthe Cescosse in the French Basque Country to Emile and Jeanne Cescosse in 1902. She began her performance career in Europe using the stage name Colette Etchery. Before going to America she was committed to the Théâtre des Bouffes-Parisiens from 1922 to 1927 where she established herself as a comedienne and soprano in French operetta. Initially trained as a singer in Paris by Berton, she later studied singing with Estelle Liebling, the voice teacher of Beverly Sills, in New York City.

== Pre-World War II career as Colette D'Arville ==
D'Arville went to the United States in 1928 when the talent agents Edward S. Keller and Sam Shannon of the K-A-O agency booked her on the American vaudeville circuit; and it is at this time that she adopted the stage name Colette D'Arville.

They marketed her as 18 years of age at the time, but in reality she was 26. She made her American theatre debut as Claudette Pernier in the Roger Wolfe Kahn, Joseph Meyer, and Irving Caesar musical Here's Howe which premiered at the Shubert Theatre in Boston on 23 April 1928, for a week of tryout performances. The work opened on Broadway at the Broadhurst Theatre on 1 May 1928, and was produced by Alex. A. Aarons and Vinton Freedley with choreography by Sammy Lee. After that production closed on 20 June 1928, she performed the role of Trini in the national tour of Dave Stamper's musical Take the Air which began in August 1928.

Later that year she was put under contract as a singer on WHN radio in New York City, and was put under contract with Metro-Goldwyn-Mayer to film some musical shorts in Hollywood.

D'Arville performed periodically at the Opéra-Comique in Paris during the 1930s. In 1931, she portrayed the title role in Bizet's Carmen at the Crescent Theatre in Trenton, New Jersey, for her first foray into opera in the United States. That same year she made her New York recital debut at The Town Hall. In Egypt, she appeared in the 1932 film Sons of Aristocrats, which marks her debut in Egyptian cinema. She publicized Linit Bath Soaps in 1932 radio commercials for the product. That same year she gave a recital at the New York Biltmore Hotel which featured songs by Robert Schumann and Manuel de Falla. She toured the United States as Carmen with the Cosmopolitan Grand Opera Company in 1932, earning rave reviews in The Washington Post when the troupe performed at the National Theatre in January of that year:

Colette D'Arville was a gay, bewitching, whimsical coquette in Bizet's opera Carmen last night when an appreciative audience enjoyed her wiles and witcheries and realistic portrayal of the cigarette girl of Old Seville ... Mlle. D'Arville, singing the role in French, was entirely in her element. Her voice is a dramatic soprano with coloratura range and vivid in interpretation. With Calvé fervor she threw herself into the role. Her acting was of a high order and an attractive personality enhanced the thrilling operatic picture presented by her.

In 1935, D'Arville starred opposite Carlos Gardel in the musical film Tango Bar as Chichita which was directed by John Reinhardt for Paramount Pictures. That same year she was a member of WOR's Light Opera Troupe which performed operettas and musical theatre material on the radio. In 1936 she was one of the founding members of the American Guild of Musical Artists. That same year she performed in recitals with Metropolitan Opera tenor Giovanni Martinelli. In 1937 D'Arville portrayed Carmen at the Academy of Music in Philadelphia. In 1939 she was a featured performer in a concert hosted by composer Deems Taylor at the Waldorf Astoria Hotel entitled "A Spring in Old Vienna".

== Relationships with Giovanni Martinelli and Deems Taylor ==
Tenor Giovanni Martinelli and D'Arville were lovers during the 1930s and 1940s. She was also simultaneously involved with composer Deems Taylor, who she met in 1934. Taylor traveled with D'Arville to the Basque Country in 1936, and in a private letter to his ex-wife Mary Kennedy from March 1936 he wrote about his intention to propose marriage to her. His opinion of her was tempered after he discovered that she was having relations regularly with Solomon R. Guggenheim. In an interview famous Met soprano Rosa Ponselle said the following about the impact Martinelli's affair with Colette had on his singing and his personal life,

He wasn't singing too well, no, but that wasn't the problem I'm talking about. His life had gotten complicated around then. He was having this affair with Colette D'Arville. She had been a singer—she did light things, I think, at the Opéra-Comique. I met her and got to know her a little, but I don't think she was singing much around that time. I don't know what she was doing, really. I guess the polite way to say it is that she was an 'international consort'. She was a pretty girl, and Martinelli was head over heels about her. Everybody knew [about] it, and some of us thought it was affecting his singing. I never thought he was quite the same [vocally] after that. His range was still okay, but there was a hardness in his tone from then on.

== Work during World War II and death ==
D'Arville was visiting family in Paris during World War II when the German Army invaded the city in June 1940. She succeeded in making her way to unoccupied territory, and managed to return to New York City. She portrayed the title role in Massenet's Le jongleur de Notre-Dame with the Newark Civic Grand Opera in April 1942.

In 1943, she sang in "camp shows" with the United Service Organizations for the United States Armed Forces at Camp Kilmer with Martinelli. She also volunteered her talents for performances at the American Theatre Wing's Stage Door Canteen during World War II.

D'Arville died in New York City in 1944 at the age of 42. She had one son, Gaston Etienne Cescosse, who was born out of wedlock.

== Filmography ==
- 1932: Sons of Aristocrats
- 1935: Tango Bar
