= The Song of the Heart (1932 film) =

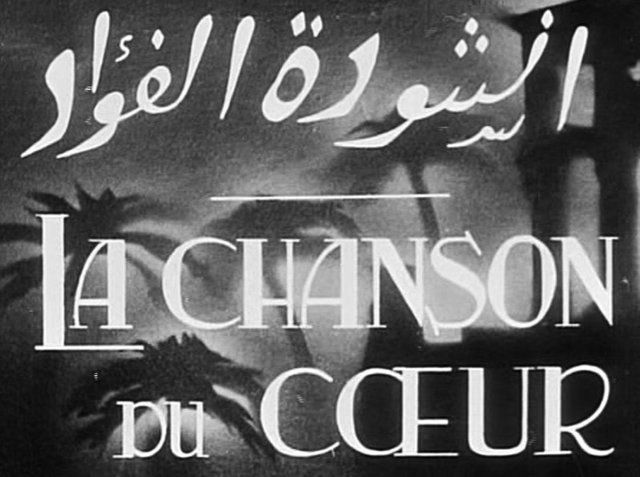
- Arabic: أنشودة الفؤاد
- Directed by: Mario Volpe; Stephan Rosti
- Written by: Khalil Mutran; Edmond Nahas; Stephan Rosti; Lazar
- Starring: Nadra Amin; George Abyad
- Cinematography: Tullio Chiarini
- Music by: Naguib El Nahhas
- Production company: Edmund Nahhas Films
- Release dates: 13 April 1932 (Cairo, Alexandria)
- Running time: 125 minutes
- Country: Egypt
- Language: Egyptian Arabic

The Song of the Heart is a 1932 Egyptian film directed by Mario Volpe and Stephan Rosti and written by Khalil Mutran, Edmond Nahas, and Rosti. It was the second Egyptian sound film, released the same year as the first Egyptian sound film, Sons of Aristocrats. It was also the first Middle Eastern musical film.

The Song of the Heart was the first film to open in Cairo and Alexandria at the same time.

== Synopsis ==
The film revolves around a wealthy man who falls in love with a foreign dancer. Another man who works for the wealthy man also falls in love with this dancer, which leads to his wife's suspicions. She complains to her brother, who argues with his sister's husband. This argument results in the wife's brother being shot, the husband fleeing, and the wife's death after giving birth to a daughter.

== Cast ==
- Nadra Amin as Nadra
- George Abyad as Ibrahim
- Zakariyya Ahmad as Omar
- Edmond Tuema as Prosecutor
- Abdel Rahman Roshdy as Hosny
- Mohamed Abdallah as Ahmed
- Ali Ahmed as Amin Pasha
- Lian Darfil as Merai
- Nadia as Laila
- Moursi Abdellatif as Lazar
- Daisy Palma as Laila's nanny

== Songs ==
Nadra Amin performing a song by Zakariyya Ahmad in The Song of the Heart

All songs performed by Nadra:

- Song of the Heart
- Oh Sea of the Nile
- Oh Precious

== See also ==
- Egyptian cinema
- List of Egyptian films of 1932
