= Laila Fawzi =

Egyptian actress (1923–2005)

- ليلى فوزي
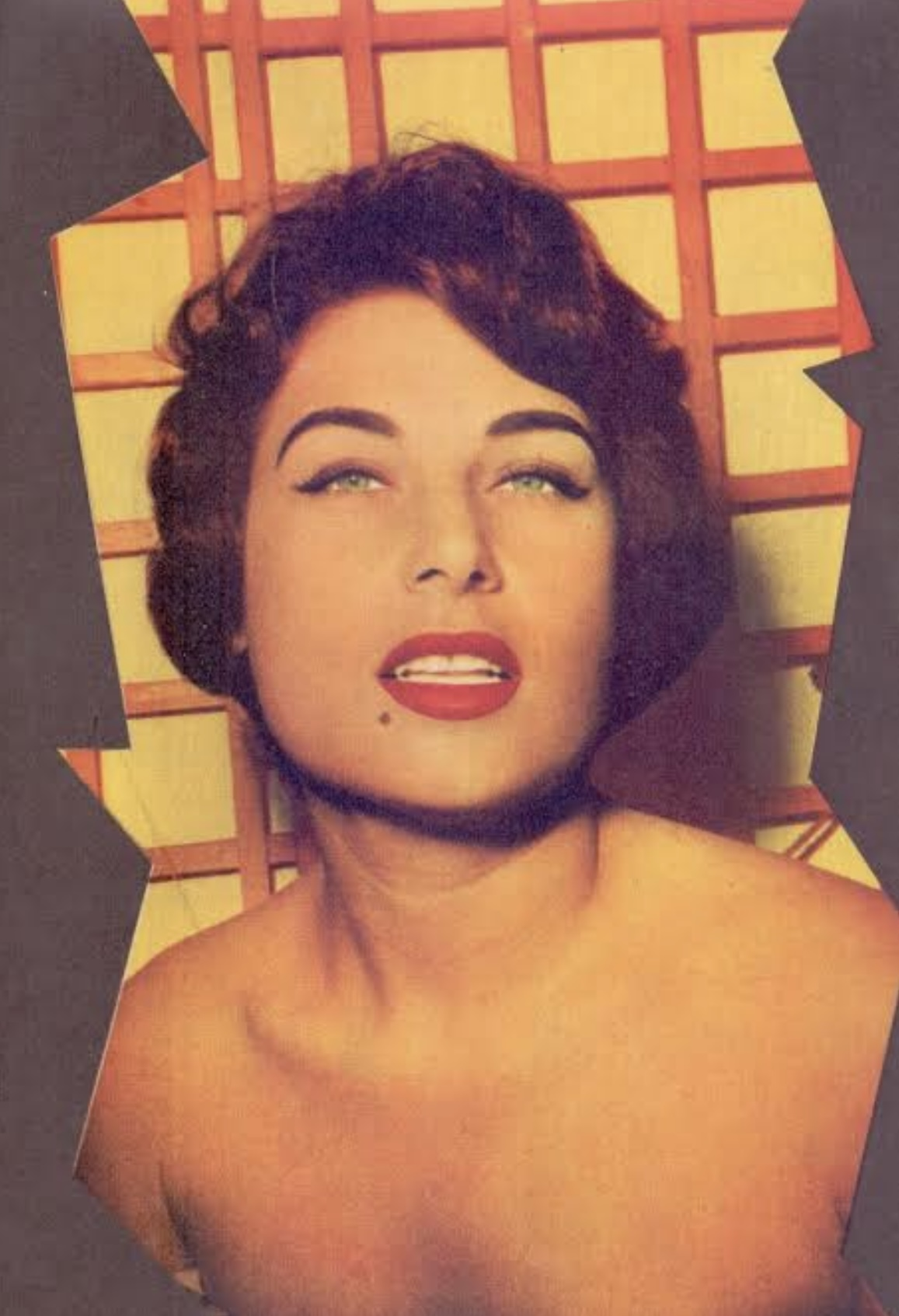
- Laila Fawzi in 1959
- Born: 1923; Turkey
- Died: January 12, 2005 (aged 80–81); Cairo, Egypt
- Occupations: Model, actress, Miss Egypt
- Spouses: Aziz Osman; Anwar Wagdi; Galal Moawad

Laila Fawzi (Arabic: ليلى فوزي, romanized: Laylā Fawzī; 1923 – January 12, 2005), also spelt Leila Fawzi and Layla Fawzy, was an Egyptian actress, model and beauty pageant titleholder. She was one of the pioneers of Egyptian cinema and starred in over 85 films throughout her career. In 1940, she was crowned Miss Egypt.

== Personal life ==
Fawzi was born in Turkey to an Egyptian father and a Turkish mother. Her father owned fabric stores in Cairo, Damascus and Istanbul. She won the Miss Egypt contest in 1940 and was awarded a small role in the Egyptian movie Wives Factory in 1941.

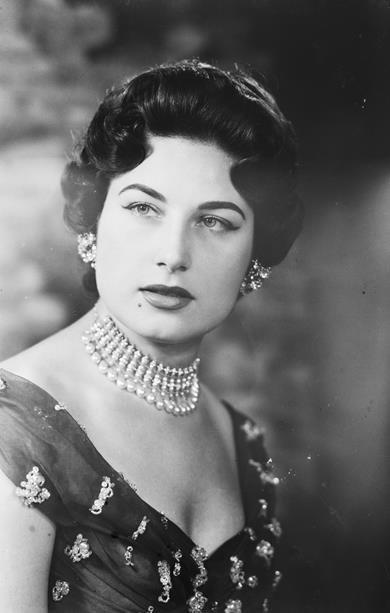
Laila Fawzi

She married three times; first to fellow Egyptian actor Aziz Osman, followed by actor Anwar Wagdi, and then television presenter Galal Moawad.

== Death ==
Fawzi died on January 12, 2005.
