= Togo Mizrahi =

Egyptian actor and filmmaker

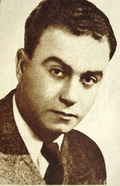
- Togo Mizrahi (1901–1986)
- Born: Joseph Elie Mizrahi; 2 June 1901; Alexandria, Egypt
- Died: 5 June 1986 (aged 84); Rome, Italy
- Occupations: Actor and filmmaker

Togo Mizrahi (Note: Arabic: توجو مزراحى Egyptian Arabic: [ˈtoːɡo mizˈrɑːħi]) (June 2, 1901 – June 5, 1986) was an Egyptian actor and filmmaker. Mizrahi was a prolific filmmaker best known for making popular comedies and musicals. In addition to his filmmaking, Mizrahi also had his Ph.D. in economics and was a speaker of many languages. For the majority of his career, Mizrahi produced, directed, and wrote most of his films.

Between 1930 and 1946, he directed 30 Arabic-speaking films and four Greek-speaking films, and he produced several films directed by other filmmakers.

== Early life ==
Mizrahi was born in Alexandria, Egypt, to a Jewish family with Italian nationality. He was born into a wealthy family who had made their fortune in the cotton and textile trades. As a child he adopted the nickname, Togo, after Admiral Togo, commemorating Japan's victory over Russia in the Russo-Japanese War. In terms of his education, Togo studied in France and in Italy before returning to Alexandria to begin his career as a filmmaker.

== Career ==
In 1929 Mizrahi established a studio in Alexandria, Egypt, and founded a production company, The Egyptian Films Company, or the Shirkat el-Aflam el-Misriyya in Egyptian Arabic. This production company was highly successful, producing more films than any other studio in Egypt during the 1930s. He produced his first films in Alexandria until 1939, when he moved to Cairo and rented Studio Wahbi which was the centre of his filmmaking until he opened a second location. According to scholar Deborah A. Starr, Mizrahi's move to Cairo was likely made to allow for more access to actors, staff, and resources which were more abundant in the capital. Despite this move, Mizrahi's early impact is noted by Martin Gilbert who referred to him as "a founding father of the Alexandrian cinema." Over the course of his career, Mizrahi worked with many popular actors and musicians. He made a number of comedies starring Chalom (Leon Angel), Ali el-Kassar, and Fawzi el-Jazayirli. He directed five films starring singer Leila Mourad. His film, Sallama (1945), starring the Egyptian diva, Umm Kulthum, is thought to be her best performance on screen. He also worked with Youssef Wahbi, Amina Rizk, and Anwar Wagdi. Mizrahi directed actors Taheyya Kariokka and Ismail Yassine in their screen debuts.

Mizrahi was extremely popular in his time both with the public and with critics for creating culturally Egyptian stories for the Egyptian public. He has however been dismissed by some critics for his unserious style which was judged by some as lacking depth. For example, critic Ali Abu Shadi called Mizrahi's plot lines “contrived and exaggerated.” His films focused on addressing the societal divide between Muslim and Jewish communities in Egypt. To achieve this, most of Mizrahi's films starred Jewish, Arab, Greek and occasionally francophone characters sharing the screen together. Additionally, according to scholar Deborah A. Starr, a large aspect of Mizrahi's work involved representing the lower-class in Egypt, despite his own significant wealth. One of the last films Mizrahi made was Sallama (1945), a film centred around Arab history. This film was one of his most successful productions and is cited by Mustafa Darwish as being Umm Kulthum’s greatest acting achievement.

Mizrahi’s style of filmmaking in his Alexandria studio is distinguishably different from his Cairo style, particularly looking at the comedies he produced between 1934 and 1938. According to Deborah A. Starr, Mizarahi’s Alexandria comedies mostly took place in the streets and public spaces of everyday life, emphasizing the city’s urban sprawl. Additionally, Starr observes that these comedies also featured some variation of the same three simple character types; a poor seller named Chalom who is often compared to Charlie Chaplin by critics, a down on his luck man named Usman, and a shop-keeper named Babah. These comedies are also distinct for their plot lines which are often set in Egypt in the 1930s and feature tropes such as mistaken identity. Although Mizrahi retained many of these themes as his career advanced, his work in Cairo is marked by a distinct exploration of other genres beyond comedy.

In 1946, Mizrahi was accused of Zionist collaboration. The political state in Egypt during the post-war period led to what Starr refers to as “the diminishing status of Jews in Egypt.” This led to heavier criticism of Mizrahi's work as it was seen as not fitting in with new nationalistic ideas. As a result of this accusation and this growing religious and cultural divide, he was forced out of Egypt. Although he seemed poised for a comeback in 1949, Mizrahi never made another movie. In 1952, he appointed his brother Alfred Mizrahi to oversee daily operations of the Egyptian Films Company. Mizrahi left Egypt and settled in Rome, where he died on June 5, 1986.

== Filmography ==
=== Egyptian films ===
- 1930: Cocaine or The Abyss (el kokaïn) (el Hâwya)
- 1932: 5001 (khamsat âlaf wa wâhid)
- 1933: Sons of Egypt (Awlâd Misr)
- 1934: The Two Delegates (el Mandoubân)
- 1935: Doctor Farahat (el Doktor Farhât)
- 1935: Shalom the Interpreter (Shalom el tourgmân)
- 1935: The Sailor (el bahhâr)
- 1936: A Hundred Thousand Pounds (Mit alf guinih)
- 1936: The Guard of the Barracks (Khafir el darak)
- 1937: Too Much Money is a Nuisance (el ‘Izz bahdalah)
- 1937: Shalom the Athlete (Shalom el riyâdî)
- 1937: Seven o'clock (el Sâ‘ah Sab‘ah)
- 1938: The Telegram (el Telegraf)
- 1938: This is my nature! (Anâ tab ī Kidah)
- 1939: Osman and Ali (‘Othman wa ‘Ali)
- 1939: Lend me Three Pounds (Sallifnî talâtah guinîh)
- 1939: A Rainy Night (Laylah moumtirah)
- 1940: The Chief Contractor (el Bâchmouqâwil)
- 1940: The Heart of a Woman (Qalb imira’ah)
- 1941: The Three Musketeers (el Foursân el thalâthah)
- 1941: Laila from the Countryside (Layla bint el rif)
- 1941: One Thousand and One Nights (Alf Lailah wa Lailah)
- 1941: Laila the School Girl (Layla bint el madâris)
- 1942: Laila (Layla)
- 1942: Ali Baba and the Forty Thieves (‘Ali Bâbâ wa-l-arba'in harâmi)
- 1943: The Right Path (el Tariq el moustaqîm)
- 1943: Long live Women! (Tahyâ el sittât)
- 1944: Laila in the Dark (Layla fi-l-zalâm)
- 1944: Lies, Lies! (Kidb fi kidb)
- 1944: Nour Eddine and the Three Sailors (Nour Eddine wa-l-bahhârah el thalâthah)
- 1945: Sallama (Sallâmah)
- 1945: Long live Men! (Tahyâal-riggâlah)

=== Greek films ===
- 1937: Δόκτωρ Επαμεινώνδας Dr. Epaminondas (Doktor Epaminondas)
- 1938: Προσφυγοπούλα The Refugee Girl (Prosfigopoula)
- 1938: Όταν ο σύζυγος ταξιδεύει When the Husband is Absent (Otan o syzygos taxidevi)
- 1943: Καπετάν Σκορπιός Captain Scorpion (Kapetan Skorpios)

=== Producer ===
- 1944: The Son of the Blacksmith (Ibn el haddâd)
- 1944: Mohamed Ali Street (Shâri’ Mouhammad ‘Ali)
- 1945: Appearances (el Mazâhir)
- 1945: The Great Artist (el Fannân el 'azîm)
- 1945: Love Story (Qissat gharâm)
- 1946: Divine Providence (Yadu Allah)
- 1946: Love Train (Express el houbb)
- 1946: Beauty Queen (Malikat el gamâl)
