= Sharifa Fadel =

Egyptian singer and actress (1938–2022)

- شريفة فاضل
- Born: Fawkia Mahmud Ahmed Nada; 27 September 1938; Cairo, Egypt
- Died: 5 March 2023 (aged 84); Cairo, Egypt
- Other names: Cherifa Fadel; Sharifa Fadel; Sharifa Fadil

Sharifa Fadel (Arabic: شريفة فاضل 27 September 1938 – 5 March 2023), stage name of Fawkia Mahmud Ahmed Nada (Arabic: فوقيَّة محمود أحمد ندا), was an Egyptian singer and actress.

== Life and career ==
Born in Cairo, the granddaughter of qāriʾ Ahmed Nada Fadel, Sharifa Fadel started her career as a child, appearing in a radio program for children and in several films starting from 1947. Trained since childhood in music and religious chanting, she studied at the Cairo Institute of Dramatic Arts.

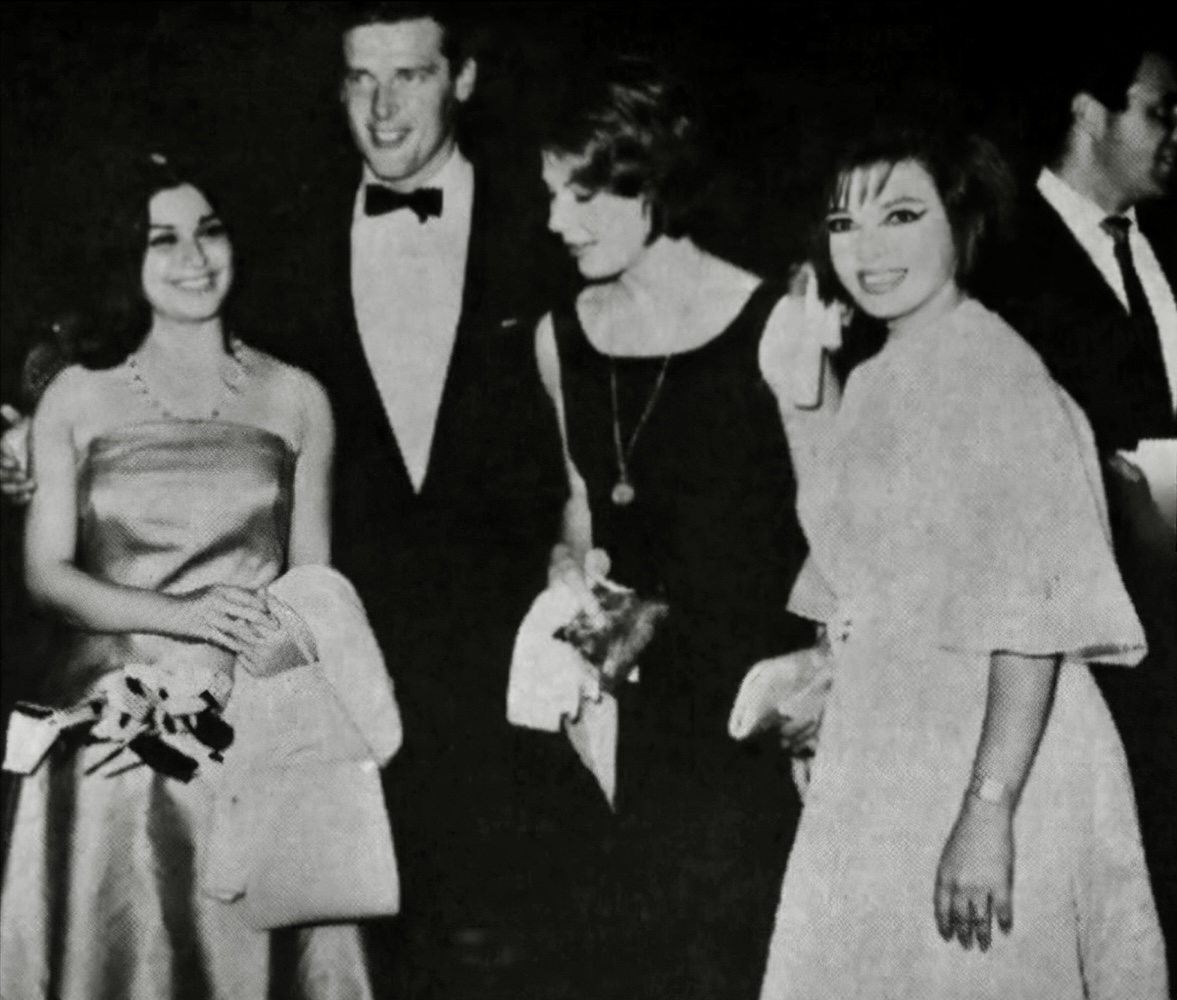
Fadel (first from right) with Soad Hosny, Roger Moore and Shwikar at the Alexandria Television Festival, 1963

Among the most popular Egyptian singers between the 1950s and the 1980s, Fadel made her professional debut recording "Amanat Ma Tshahrni Ya Bakra" by composer Mohamed Al-Moji. Her hits include "Tamm El-Badr Badry", "Haret El-Sakayeen", composed by her longtime collaborator Mounir Murad, and "Om El-Batal", a 1973 song in honor of her son, who had died in the Yom Kippur War. As an actress, she appeared in about 20 films and also worked on stage and in radio. She retired in the early 1990s.

== Death ==
Fadel died on 5 March 2023, at the age of 85.
