= Anwar Wagdi =

Egyptian actor (1904–1955)

- أنور وجدي
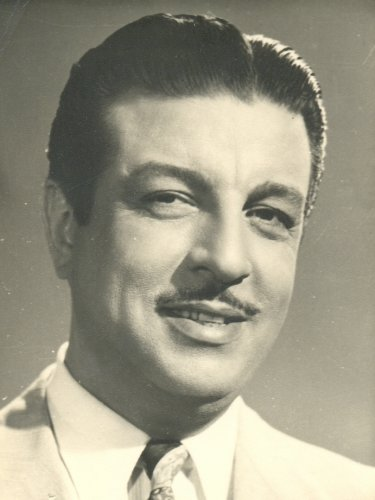
- Born: Anwar Wagdi Yehia Al Fattal; 11 October 1904; Cairo, Egypt
- Died: 14 May 1955 (aged 50); Stockholm, Sweden
- Occupations: Actor; film director; film producer; screenwriter
- Years active: 1922–1955
- Spouses: Elham Hussein; Leila Mourad (m. 1945; div. 1953): Laila Fawzi

Anwar Wagdi (Egyptian Arabic: أنور وجدى, pronounced [ˈɑnwɑɾ ˈwæɡdi]; 11 October 1904 – 14 May 1955), born Anwar Wagdi Yehia Elfattal, was an Egyptian actor, screenwriter, director and producer.

== Life ==
Anwar was born in the Cairo district of El Daher, Cairo his father was Syrian, and his mother, Mohiba Elrikabi, was Egyptian. Anwar Wagdy was married to Egyptian actresses Elham Hussein, Leila Mourad, and Laila Fawzi. He died at 50 in Sweden while seeking treatment for polycystic kidney disease.

== Career ==
Anwar Wagdi began his acting career as an extra in 1922 in the Youssef Wahbi Theatre Company's production of Julius Caesar. He quickly leaped to stardom and played leading roles in and/or directed 92 Egyptian films between the 1932 and 1955. He achieved particular success partnering with his wife, Egyptian legend Leila Mourad.

Yousef Wahbi directed his first film: "Defense" in 1934 and called "Anwar Wagdy" to take part in this film with him. After the failure of a film caused some financial problems for Youssef Wahbi and producer, which resulted in Anwar to join the National Force Theater, which was founded in 1935. Anwar Wagdi found that cinema is more suited to his talent and more in tune with its aspirations because of its popularity and its ability to reach a wider audience.

Throughout that period, he made "Wings of the Desert", in 1939. Anwar Wagdy became a star, as directors of the exploitation of its looks handsome and soft features in the provision of the roles of the rich aristocrat indifferent to any symbol of evil. And grandfather established his production company "films Nations", and produced, directed and acted in a number of films together with his wife Laila Murad, whom he married while filming the first: "The following are the poor girl."

== Filmography ==
Actor

- Sons of Aristocrats (1932)
- Agnihat el sahara (1939)
- Al-Azeema (1939)
- El warsha (1941)
- Intissar el chabab (1941)
- Leila fil zalam (1944)
- Kedb fi kedb (1944)
- Gharam wa intiqam (1944)
- Tahia el rajala (1945)
- Ragaa (1945)
- Madinat el ghajar (1945)
- Lailat el jumaa (1945)
- Lailat el haz (1945)
- Kubla fi Lubnan (1945)
- Kataltu waladi (1945)
- El-qalb louh wahid (1945)
- El hayat kefah (1945)
- Bayn narayn (1945)
- Aheb el baladi (1945)
- Sirr abi (1946)
- Leila bint el fukara (1946)
- El zalla el kabira (1946)
- Aroussa lel ajar (1946)
- Ard el Nil (1946)
- Ana wa ibn ammi (1946)
- Leila bint el agnia (1947)
- Kalbi dalili (1947)
- Fatmah (1947)
- Talak Suad hanem (1948)
- Lady Anbar (1948)
- El hawae wa el chabab (1948)
- Ghazal Al Banat (1949)
- Shebbak habibi (1951)
- El sabaa effendi (1951)
- Amir el antikam (1951)
- Raya wa Sekina (1953)
- Dahab (1953)
- Kuloub el naas (1954)
- Khatafa mirati (1954)
- El Wahsh (1954)
- Arbah banat wa zabit (1954)

Director

- Leila bint el fukara (1946)
- Leila bint el aghnia (1947)
- Kalbi dalili (1947)
- Talak Soiad hanem (1948)
- Ghazal Al Banat (1949)
- Yasmine (1951)
- Lailet el henna (1951)
- Katr el nada (1952)
- Habib el ruh (1952)
- Dahab (1953)
- Bint el akaber (1953)
- Arbaa' banat we zabit (1954)

Writer

- Ghazal Al Banat (1949)
