= Naguib el-Rihani =

Egyptian actor (1889–1949)

- نجيب الريحاني
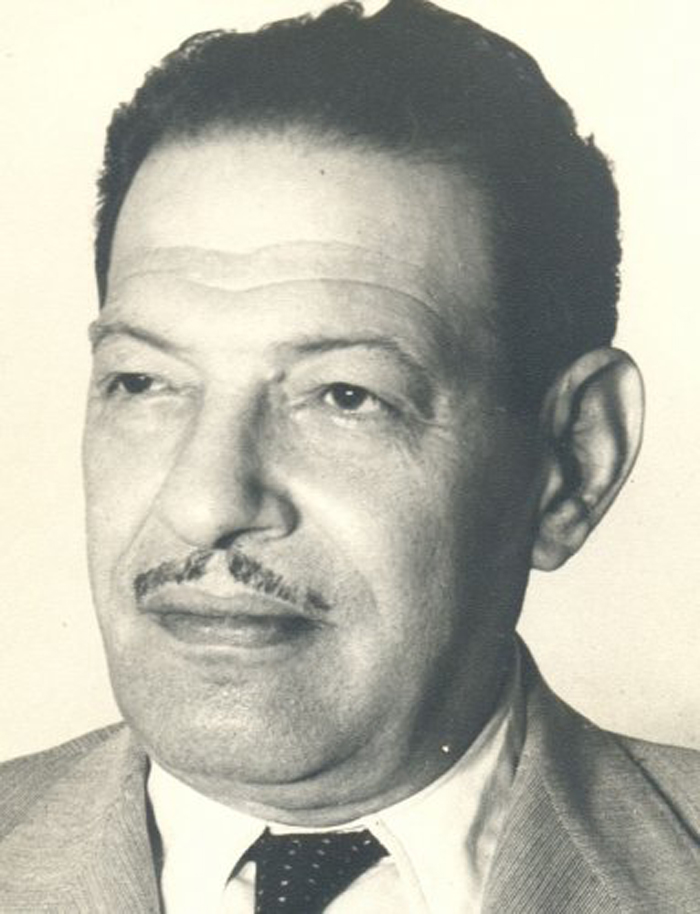
- Born: Naguib Elias Rehana نجيب إلياس ريحانة; January 21, 1889; Bab El Sheirya, Cairo, Egypt
- Died: June 8, 1949 (aged 60); Alexandria, Egypt
- Occupation: Actor
- Spouses: Lucie de Vernay, Badia Masabni

Naguib el-Rihani (Arabic: نجيب الريحاني; January 21, 1889 in Cairo – June 8, 1949 in Alexandria) was an Egyptian film and stage actor.

== Biography ==
Born in Bab El Shereya, Cairo to a middle-class family. His father, an Assyrian Christian who worked as a horse expert and a trader, his mother was a Coptic Christian Egyptian woman from Cairo. He was one of three sons that his parents would have together. He was educated in the French Catholic school "Les Frères" in Cairo.

El-Rihani had a turbulent marriage with Badia Masabni, an actress and businesswoman who settled in Cairo after living within the United States for years, and established her famous cabaret, "Casino Badia." They separated before his death. He died at the age of 60 years in Cairo of typhus, while filming his last film, "Ghazal Al Banat".

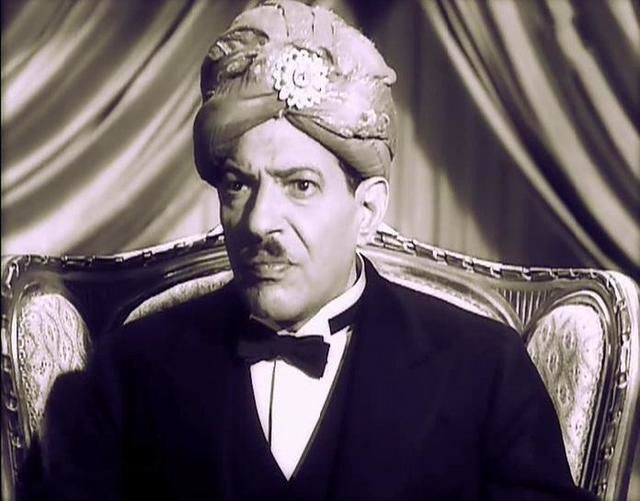
Rihani in Salama Is Okay (1937)

He established his own theatrical group in the late 1910s, in Cairo, and partnered with his lifelong friend, Badeih Khairy, in adapting several French theatre hits to the Egyptian stage, and later to the cinema.

Legendary Egyptian comedian Fouad El Mohandes, acknowledged Naguib el-Rihani's effect on him and his style in acting.

On 21 January 2016, Google Doodle commemorated his 127th birthday.

== List of plays ==
- Taaleeli Ya Bata (تعاليلي يابطة و انا مالي ايه)
- El Rial 1917.
- Kesh Kesh Bey Fee Paris. (Kesh Kesh Bey In Paris)
- Hamar We Halawa.
- Ala Keifak (As You Like)
- El Ashra El Tayeba 1920, music by Sayed Darwish.
- Ayam El Ezz (Times of Prosperity).
- Lawe Kont Malik (If I Was A King).
- Mamlaket El Hob. (Kingdom of Love)
- El Guineh El Masry (Egyptian Pound) 1931, adapted from Topaze by Marcel Pagnol
- El Donia Lama Tedhak (When Luck Smiles) 1934.
- Hokm Karakosh (Rule of Karakosh) 1936.
- Kismiti (My Luck) 1936.
- Lawe Kont Heleiwa (If I Was Handsome) 1938.
- El Dalouah (The Spoiled Girl) 1939.
- 30 Yom Fee El Segn (30 Days In Prison)
- El Setat Ma Yearfoush Yekdebo (Women Never Lie)
- Ela Khamsa إلا خمسة (Minus Five) 1943.
- Hassan, Morcos & Cohen 1945.

== Filmography ==
- Saheb Al Saada KeshKesh Beh (1931).
- Yacout (1934), adapted from "El Guineh El Masry".
- Besalamtoh Ayez Yetgawwez (1936).
- Salamah Fe Kheer (1937).
- Abou Halmoos (1941).
- Leabet Al Set (1941).
- Si Omar (1941), adapted from "Lawe Kont Heleiwa".
- Ahmar Shafayef (1946).
- Ghazal Al Banat (1949).
