= Badia Masabni =

Belly dancer, singer, actress, night club owner (1892–1974)

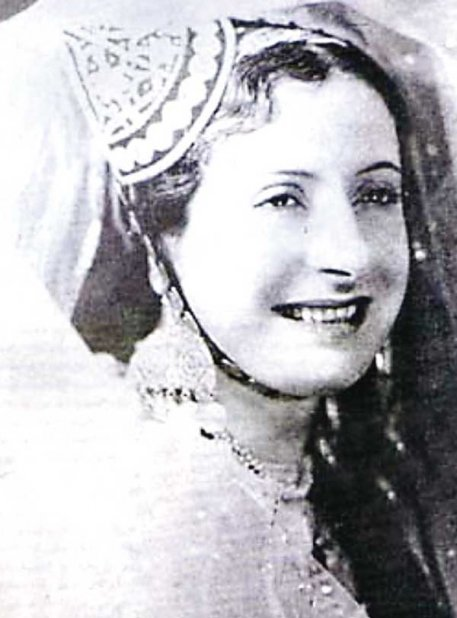
- Born: 25 February 1892; Damascus, Syria
- Died: 23 July 1974 (aged 82); Zahle, Lebanon
- Other names: Sultana, Sultanat Al-Tarab
- Years active: 1926–1952
- Spouse: Naguib el-Rihani

Badia Masabni (Arabic: بديعة مصابني, born Wadiha Masabni (Arabic: وديعة مصابني); 25 February 1892 – 23 July 1974) was a belly dancer, singer, actress, night club owner and businesswoman considered as the developer of modern belly dancing, by bringing the Western and Hollywood-esque vibe into it, after living for several years in the West and Americas since the age of seven.

Masabni also became known for opening a series of influential clubs in Cairo from the 1920s onward bringing Egyptian belly dance to the Western audience, as her casinos were frequently visited by Egypt's tourists. As a result of her influential casinos she is credited with training and launching the careers of many Egyptian artists, especially the belly dance's stars Samia Gamal and Taheyya Kariokka.

One of the most important bridges in Cairo, the Badia Bridge, is named after her and is located next to where she had her performance hall.

== Early life ==
Badia was born in 1892 in Damascus, Ottoman Empire, one of seven siblings, to a Lebanese father and a Syrian mother. Her father owned a Soapmaking business. The family's financial condition abruptly worsened when Badia's father died leaving his sons to care for the family business. Soon afterwards, the soap factory was consumed by fire and one of Badia's brothers died with fever.

She studied at a Christian school of nuns, where she was taught classical ballet and tap dancing. At the beginning of World War I she was forced by her family, with few financial resources, to marry a man she did not love. In the early 1920s she left her husband and moved to Beirut, working in a French cabaret. She later moved to Cairo, where she began a new life and her career as a theater actress and dancer.

== The Modern Belly Dance ==
The changes introduced by Badia Masabni to the oriental dance were aimed at adapting the intimate and improvised Egyptian folk dance into a crowded show and with the spirit of the variety theater or music hall. In order to achieve this Masabni aimed to fill the space, add visual dynamism and give a sensual air to the show.

In order to compete with the equivalent dance shows in Europe, she introduced Western orchestras and instruments, some of which, such as the violin, cello or accordion, had never been used before for this genre of music. The resulting music became more complex, which allowed the dancers to create more complex choreographies. She incorporated the shows with many dancers dressed in bright colors and glitter, with extremely provocative clothes at that time.

Masabni introduced a mix of classical dance movements, especially in terms of displacements, and arm movements above the horizontal, in particular the arabesques of the classical and the undulating movements of the arms extended horizontally using more flowing gestures later known as snake arms. Other types of movements she introduced are those that foreigners expected from oriental dance, such as ripples and other serpentine movements of the torso.

She also fostered the Western fantasy of veils by promoting handkerchief shows and two-piece costumes, copied from Hollywood movies, as well as trying to copy the star system. This characteristic attire was an invention of Badia Masabni. In addition to incorporations of classical dance, she also incorporated dances from other cultures, such as Turkish, Spanish, Ajami and contemporary dance, especially by Isadora Duncan. Over time, and through her disciples, influences from modern jazz, tropical dance, samba, etc. were also incorporated.

== The Badia Casino Club ==
Until the end of the 19th century, the oriental dance was danced in private or in small venues. In 1926 Masabni opened the local evening club known as the Badia Casino, also known as the Opera Casino, with the idea of attracting both Western and Eastern audiences. The Badia Casino also became the world’s first belly dancing academy.

The venue quickly began to be frequented by jet sets around the world and later, during World War II, by the military and spies. In fact it is known that Winston Churchill's son and the Duke of Gloucester were there, and that Hitler accused Masabni of being a spy in the service of Britain.

When Gamal Abedel Nasser took power in Egypt, he pursued the activities of Badia Masabni and imprisoned Taheyya Kariokka. She sold the Opera Casino and fled to Lebanon, where she lived with her adopted daughter Juliette and other relatives until her death.

== Personal life ==
She lived for a few years with actor and comedian Naguib el-Rihani, with whom she made some films, but never dared to marry him for fear of being asked to stop dancing or close the Opera Casino.She later married another man.

== Badia's Opera Casinos ==
- 1926: Sala Badia Masabni, Emad el Din, Cairo.
- 1928: Sala Badia, Alexandria.
- 1930: Casino Opera, Giza.
- 1931: Cinema Badia, Giza.

== Gallery ==
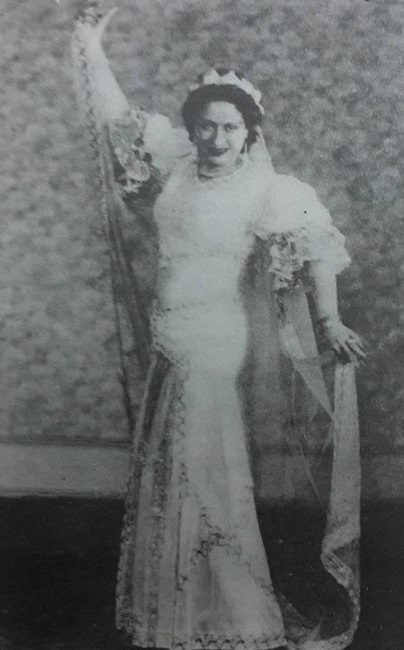
Badia Masabni in her wedding dress on 11 September 1924
