= George Abyad =

Lebanese actor (1880–1959)

- جورج أبيض
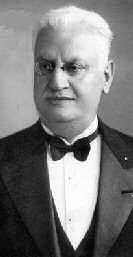
- Born: 5 May 1880; Beirut, Ottoman Empire
- Died: 12 February 1959 (aged 78); Cairo, United Arab Republic
- Occupations: Actor, theater director
- Known for: Arabic theater, early Egyptian movies

George Elias Abyad (5 May 1880 – 12 February 1959) was a Lebanese actor and theater director. He acted in Egyptian theater and cinema, and starred in the first Egyptian musical film, The Song of the Heart.

== Life and work ==
Born in Beirut, Lebanon, he migrated to Alexandria, Khedivate of Egypt, when he was 18 years old. In 1910 he started his own theater company in Cairo. He met his wife, Dawlet Abyad, while acting in this troupe. He also opened a theater in Tunis and directed it from 1921 to 1922.

Abyad became widely recognized for the formal style and polished literary language of his adaptations of Western plays. Although he initially focused on French classical plays, he later shifted toward Arabic works. Drawing on his foreign training, which shaped both his choice of repertoire and his heightened acting style, he played a role in steering Arab theatre away from its traditional popular base toward a more educated and intellectually oriented audience. He later taught at the Cairo Institute of Performing Arts until his death in 1959.

== Filmography ==
- The Song of the Heart (1932)
- Land of the Nile (1946)
- I am the East (1958)

== See also ==
- Media related to George Abyad at Wikimedia Commons
