= Youssef Wahby =

Egyptian actor (born 2001)

- يوسف وهبي
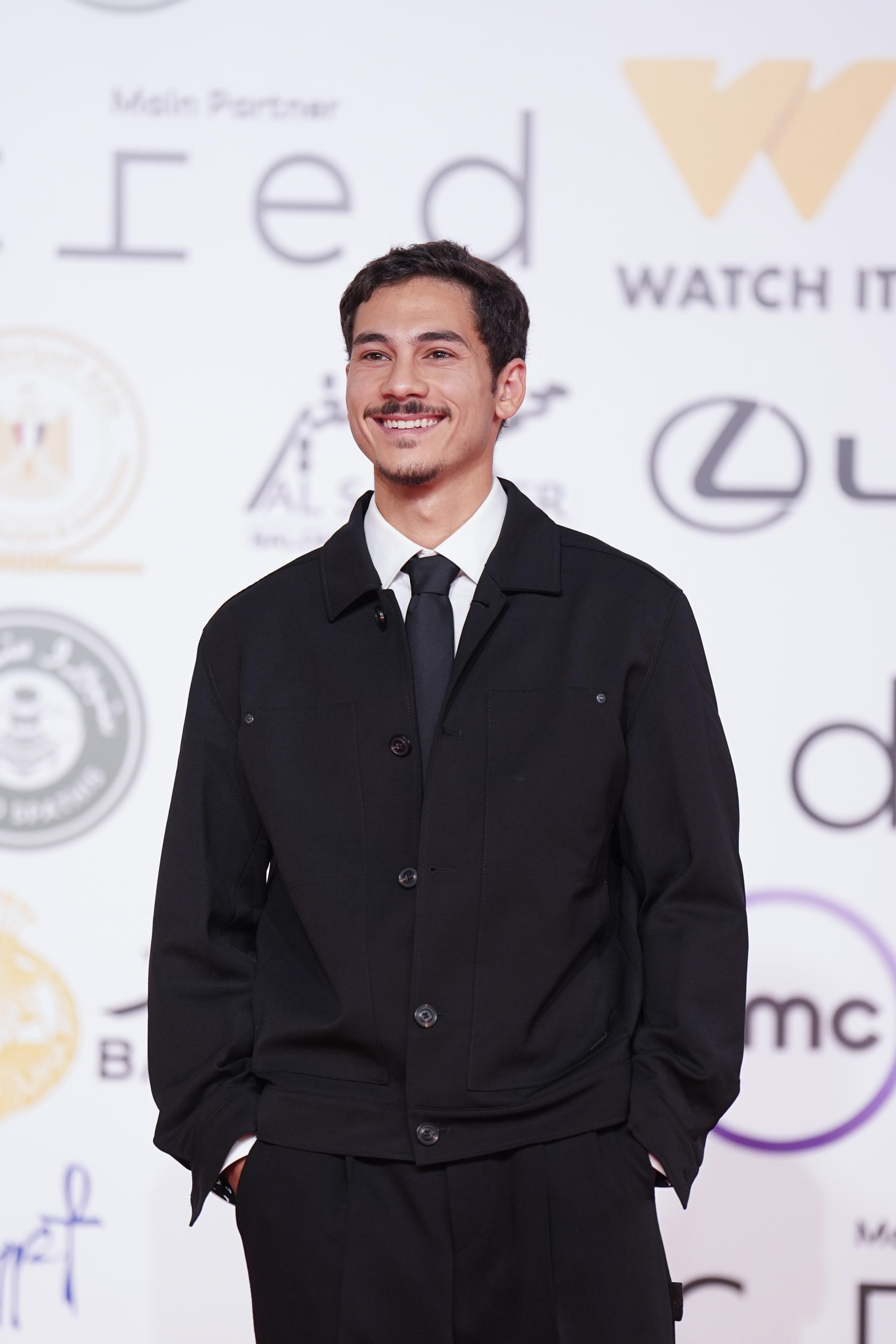
- Born: 1 March 2001 (age 25); Cairo, Egypt
- Education: The American university in Cairo
- Occupation: Actor
- Years active: 2021-present

Youssef Wahby (Arabic: يوسف وهبي; born 1 March 2001) is an Egyptian actor. He has appeared in television series including Leih Laa?! 3, Sot w Soura, Etnein Gheirna, and Forsa Akhira. Since beginning his career in the early 2020s, he has appeared in multiple Egyptian television productions. He is represented by MAD Solutions in the Middle East and North Africa (MENA) region.

== Early life and education ==
Youssef Wahby was born and raised in Cairo, Egypt. He completed his early education at Lycée Concordia, where he obtained the French Baccalauréat.

He later studied business administration with a concentration in marketing at the American University in Cairo. After graduating, he pursued acting professionally and trained through workshops with several acting coaches, including Luke Lehner, Ramsi Lehner, and Gerald James.

== Career ==
Youssef Wahby began his acting career with a role in the television series Mawdoʿ Aʿeli (2021), where he portrayed a university student. He later appeared in Leih Laa?! 3 (2022), portraying Omar.

In 2023, he appeared in Sot w Soura, portraying Hazem, a university student and amateur boxer. He received a nomination at the Joy Awards in 2024 for this role.

He subsequently appeared in Ma Tarah Lays Kama Yabdou (2025), portraying Wahid, and in Fi Lahza (2025), portraying Sari, a rap artist.

In 2026, he appeared in several television productions, including Kolohom Bihebo Moudy, in which he portrayed Ziad, Etnein Gheirna, where he played Ibrahim, and Forsa Akhira, portraying Omar.

== Filmography ==
=== Series ===
- 2021: Mawdoʿ Aʿeli
- 2022: Leih Laa?! 3
- 2023: Sot w Soura
- 2025: Ma Tarah Lays Kama Yabdou
- 2025: Fi Lahza
- 2026: Kolohom Bihebo Moudy
- 2026: Forsa Akhira
- 2026: Etnein Gheirna

=== Films ===
- 2024: El Hareefa 1

== Advertising ==
- 2025: Appeared in a Closeup advertising campaign alongside Yasmina El Abd.

== Awards and nominations ==
- 2024: Joy Awards - Nominated for Favorite Rising Actor for his role as Hazem in Sot w Soura
