= Miss Trans Global =

Annual international pageant competition

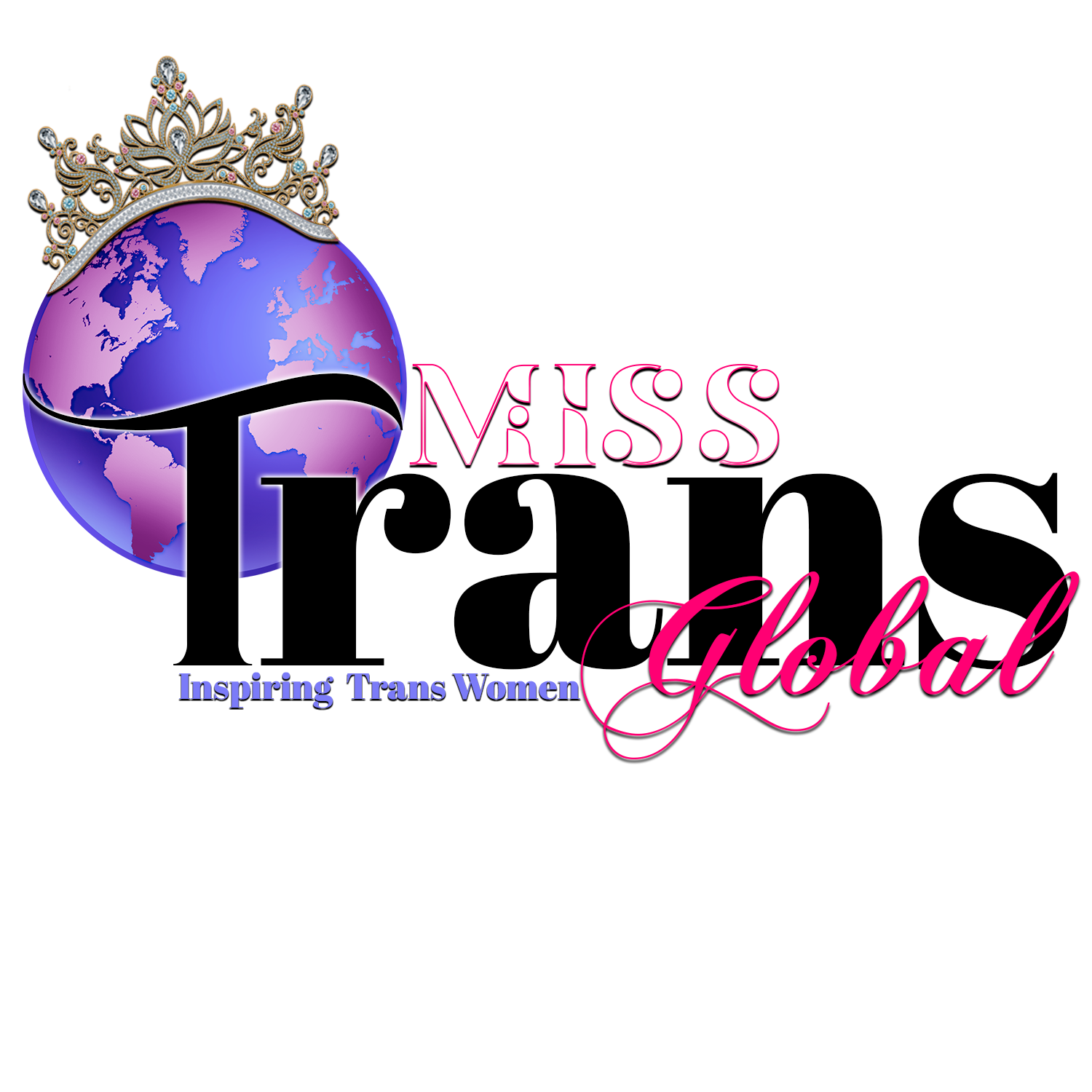
- Formation: May 1, 2020; 6 years ago
- Founder: Miss Sahhara, (since 2020) (Executive Producer/ President)
- Type: Beauty pageant
- Headquarters: London, England
- Location: United Kingdom
- Official language: English
- Current titleholder: Laura Pereira of Italy
- Affiliations: TransValid, TransBeauty Magazine
- Website: MissTransGlobal.com

Miss Trans Global is an annual international pageant for transgender women. The event broadcasts live on multiple social networking websites from London, England. It has gained traction for transgender advocacy, raising awareness about queer culture and LGBT concerns, particularly in countries where transphobia and homophobia are prevalent. The pageant presents itself as a safe space for transgender women to share their experiences through speeches, talent shows, and artistic performances.

Mela Habijan of the Philippines won the first edition of Miss Trans Global in an event held virtually on September 12, 2020. Sruthy Sithara of India won the second edition where she was the first Indian transgender woman to win an international transgender pageant.

The current winner is Laura Pereira of Italy, who was crowned on 31 March 2025, in London, United Kingdom.

== History ==
The pageant was founded by Miss Sahhara, a transgender activist, and beauty queen who was behind Queen of Nations, another pageant for transgender women which has been held in the United Kingdom for the past 13 years. According to Sahhara, she and her team thought of holding the 10th edition of Queen of Nations in 2017 online. Instead, they decided to launch a new title which is mainly geared towards transgender advocacy, education, and trans-empowerment through multiple digital platforms. They aimed to create an inclusive and accessible space for all transgender women from diverse backgrounds to express themselves on an international stage without leaving their homes or country.

According to Miss Sahhara, Miss Trans Global was conceived in 2017 and realized during the COVID-19 pandemic in 2020, with the aim of engaging transgender communities through an online international pageant.

The organizing team includes Sally Adams, a media and entertainment lawyer, Rica Paras, an information technology professional, and Imanni Da Silva, a model, artist, television presenter, and social activist.

=== The exclusion of trans women contestants from female pageantry ===
In 2019, transgender pageant winner Anita Green filed a suit against Miss United States LLC on the grounds of gender identity discrimination. Green entered a franchise of Miss United States after participating in Miss Earth United States, but was refused entry because of the competition rule which states that only a 'natural born female' is allowed to participate. A federal court dismissed Green's discrimination case against the pageant.

The court filing submitted by Miss United States constantly misgendered Green and used derogatory words to invalidate the complainant's gender identity. Miss United States also says that allowing transgender women to compete in their competition would "undermine its vision" and would undermine their "message of biological female empowerment." John T. Kaempf, the Miss United States pageant's lawyer praised the dismissal of Green's lawsuit, stating that the pageant "is not anti-transgender." "Miss United States wants to be able to hold a pageant that is only for biological females,". He stated that the organization "believes there can be a Miss Black USA pageant, a Miss Native American pageant, or a transgender pageant."

In an interview with KGW, Green said, "I compete in pageantry to show that there are many different types of beauty... To me, that rule was saying that transgender women aren't women, and that sends a very harmful message."

Unperturbed by the news of the dismissal of her case, Green said “she is not giving up on her fight for justice for transgender women, and she is very proud of her achievement in raising awareness about the discrimination transgender women face in pageantry”. "This case brought awareness to an issue many people were and still are unaware of," Green told Oregon Live, "and that issue is that discrimination against transgender people is still actively happening in the private and public sector even within the pageant circuit."

=== The exclusion of transgender women from female only spaces ===
Some transgender activists have affirmed that the exclusion of transgender women from female-only spaces such as sports, pageants, and bathrooms has necessitated the creation of dedicated spaces for transgender people. Others argue that it may foster segregation.

Sociologist and feminist campaigner Finn Mackay stated in an interview with The Guardian, that reducing womanhood to fertility and genitals trivialises the damage done by patriarchy influenced by politics when it comes to sexuality and gender. "They do it for ideological reasons, as part of a campaign for trans exclusion. When people turn round and say: 'This is a dog whistle' – of course it is! Otherwise, why would you be chatting about people's genitals?" Mackay asked.

=== Recent success ===
Miss USA, a franchise of Miss Universe, started allowing transgender women in their pageant in 2012. The pageant's first transgender state representative was Kataluna Enriquez, winner of Miss Nevada USA. Enriquez served as a judge in the first edition of Miss Trans Global.

== Goal ==
The main premise of Miss Trans Global is to "revolutionize pageantry" by including transgender women in mainstream beauty pageantry, and to raise awareness for trans issues. Many of the contestants are also transgender rights activists. Their advocacies are heavily influenced by transphobic violence, including domestic violence, discrimination, and the murders of transgender women globally. An associate of the Miss Trans Global's team, Yunieski Carey Herrera, was murdered by her partner on November 17, 2020, in Miami, Florida. She was crowned Miss Trans Global in 2019.

== Advocacy ==
According to the organisation, the top 5 winners of Miss Trans Global work as spokespersons on transgender and LGBT issues worldwide. They claim to work closely with activist organisations such as TransValid, TransBeauty Magazine, TransGriot, to educate cisgender people and inspire transgender people globally. The organisation started an initiative called 'For Trans Women by Trans Women', where a group of transgender women from different countries come together to raise awareness about issues that affect their local communities.

The organizers said that Miss Trans Global "is not about a beautiful face and perfect body" but rather "about activism, charity, and intelligence".

The pageant says the winners will serve as spokespeople "and work digitally to influence positive changes in our community internationally."

The pageant considers itself as a digital and physical space for transgender women from different backgrounds who are driven through activism to highlight the plight of LGBT people in their various countries. The participants share their lived experiences through the use of digital content production and publishing through the guidance of the organisation.

== Competition and selection of winners ==
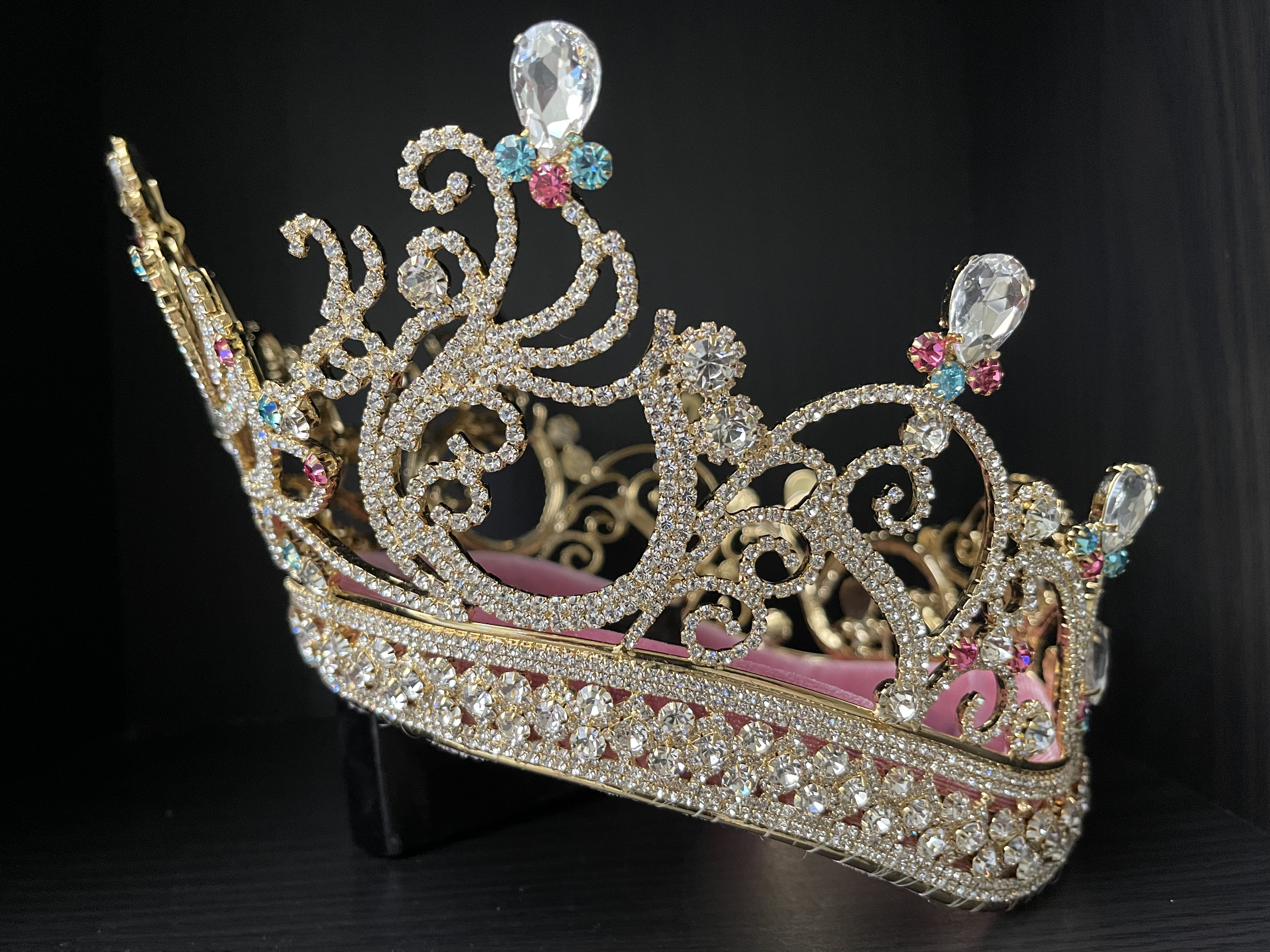
The Empowered Queen Crown, is the official Miss Trans Global crown since 2020–present

The organisers of the competition described it as "the future of international trans pageantry", because of its accessibility and ease of participation. The contestants execute the various tasks at home and submit videos to the judges. The winners are selected based on the scores given by the judges.

=== Competition format ===
Contestants are given a creative challenge once a week. They film and produce a submission video in accordance with the rules and guidelines stipulated by the pageant directors. The judges then review their performances and score the contestants accordingly.

=== Judging ===
The judges are seasoned female transgender activists and pageant queens who have fought for transgender rights in their various countries.

=== Titles ===
Miss Trans Global and its runner-up titles, namely:

- Queen Global, Miss Trans Global
- Queen Diamond, Miss Trans Global Diamond
- Queen Sapphire, Miss Trans Global Sapphire
- First Princess Global, Continental Queen
- Second Princess Global, Continental Queen

The organisation's definition of a queen is a transgender woman who uses their voice for the voiceless and someone who marries the ambition of helping marginalised transgender community that are often discriminated against due to misconceptions.

== Inaugural event ==
The inaugural competition, which took place on September 12, 2020, focused on transgender people suffering in isolation due to the COVID-19 pandemic. It included participants from countries around the world. Miss Mela Franco Habijan from the Philippines became the first ever winner of the competition, in a coronation ceremony streamed live on YouTube and Facebook.

The pageant's inaugural judges were:

- Monica Roberts, a notable transgender rights advocate and journalist in the United States who died on October 5, 2020
- Candi Stratton, a flight attendant, beauty queen, and transgender rights advocate
- Michelle Ross, founder-director of CliniQ Counselling and Wellbeing
- Kataluna Enriquez, Miss Nevada USA and fashion designer
- Victoria Maxima Caram, Miss Trans Star International executive director
- Amanda Uzoma McQueens, founder of Friends in Diaspora for Friends in Africa

== Titleholders ==
Edition	Country	Titleholder	National title	Venue of competition	Finalists
2020	Philippines	Mela Habijan	Miss Trans Global Philippines	Virtual event, London, United Kingdom	18
2021	India	Sruthy Sithara	Miss Trans Global India	Virtual event, London, United Kingdom	16
2022	Brazil	Natasha Cardoso	Miss Trans Global Brasil	Virtual event, London, United Kingdom	6
2023	Thailand	Sarocha Akaros	Miss LGBT Thailand	Rhoda McGaw Theatre, London, United Kingdom	10
2024	France	Kevhoney Scarlett (appointed)	Miss Trans Global France	Rhoda McGaw Theatre, London, United Kingdom	10
2025	Italy	Laura Pereira	Miss Trans Global Italy	Rhoda McGaw Theatre, London, United Kingdom	7

=== By number of wins ===
Country/Territory	Titles	Winner Year
Italy	1	2025
France	1	2024
Thailand	1	2023
Brazil	1	2022
India	1	2021
Philippines	1	2020

=== Gallery of Miss Trans Global winners ===
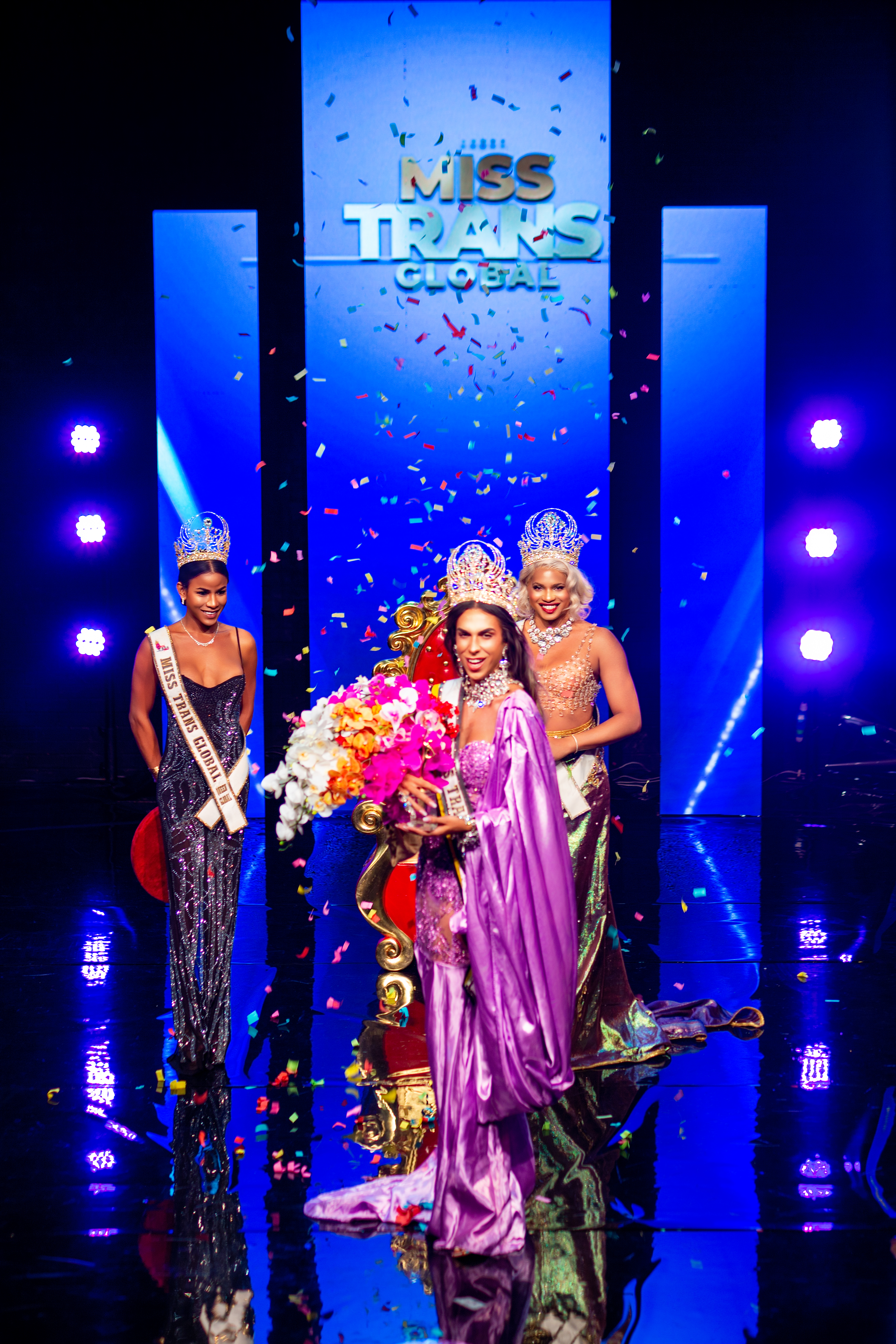
Miss Trans Global 2025
Laura Pereira
Italy

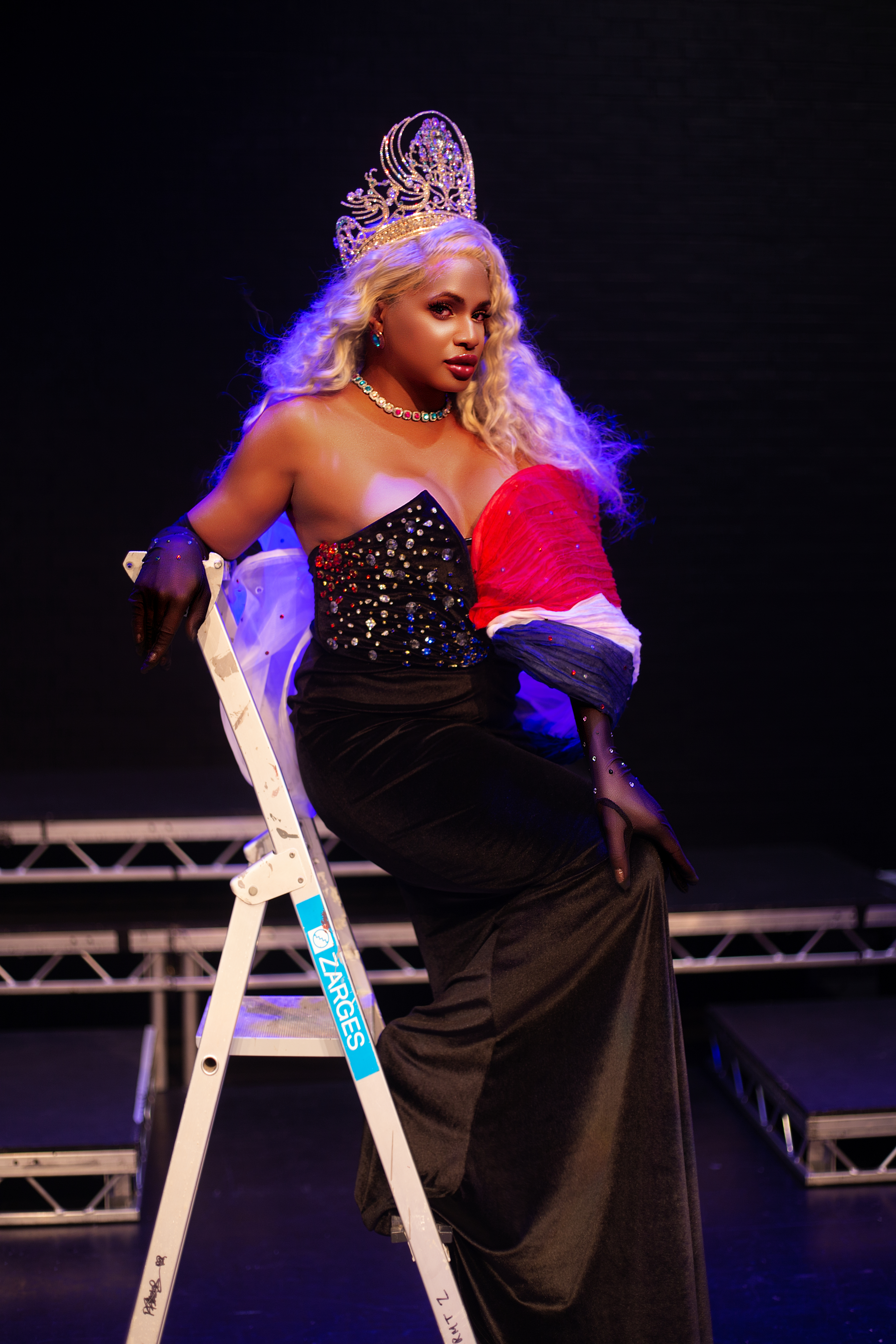
Miss Trans Global 2024
Kevhoney Scarlett
(appointed)
France

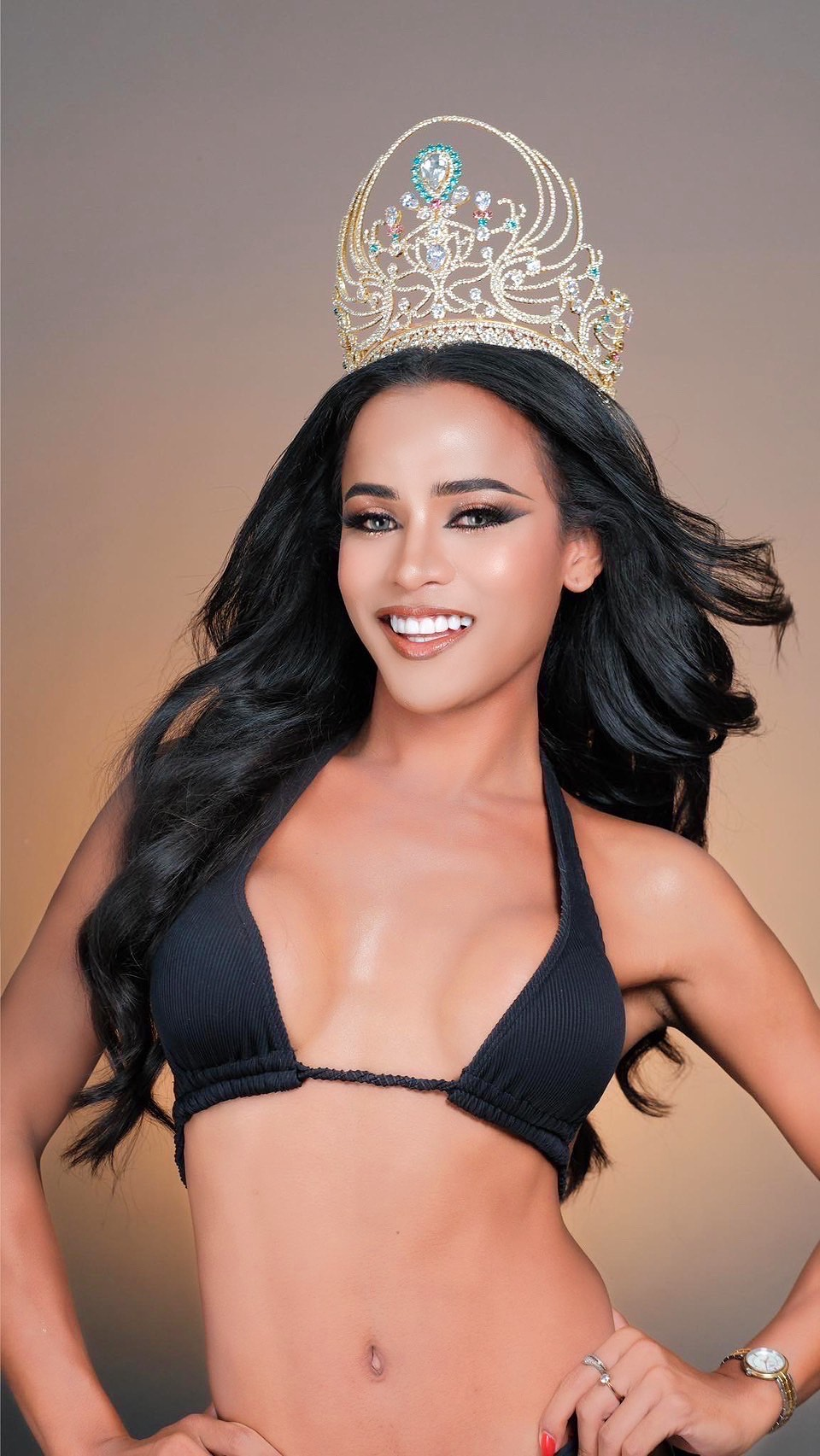
Miss Trans Global 2023
Piano Sarocha Akaros
Thailand

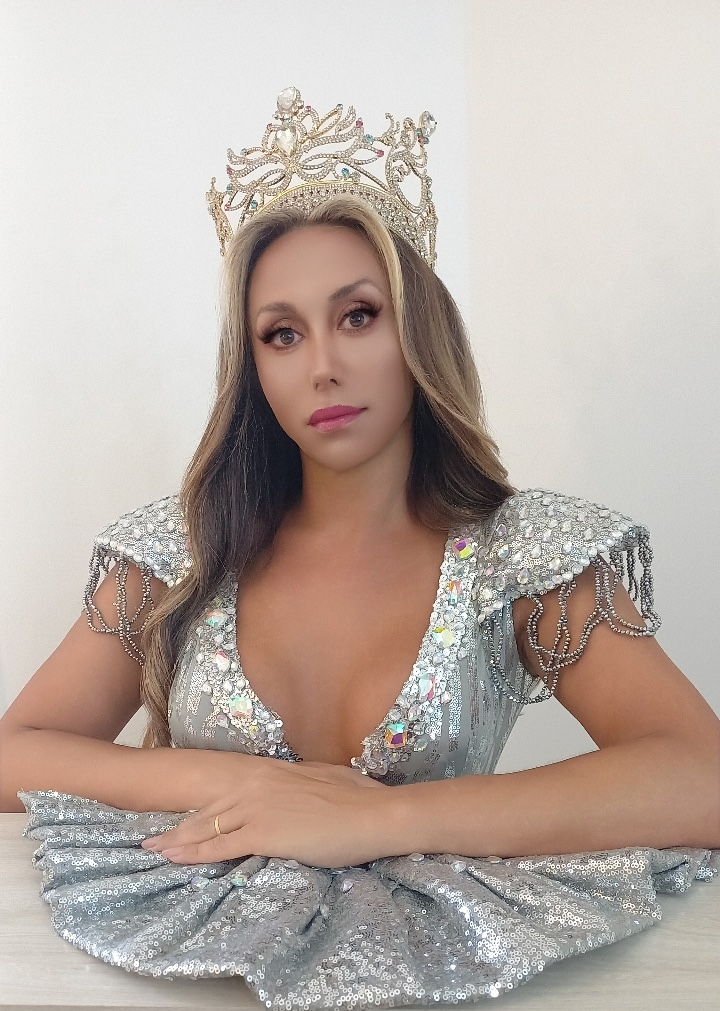
Miss Trans Global 2022
Natasha Cardoso
Brazil

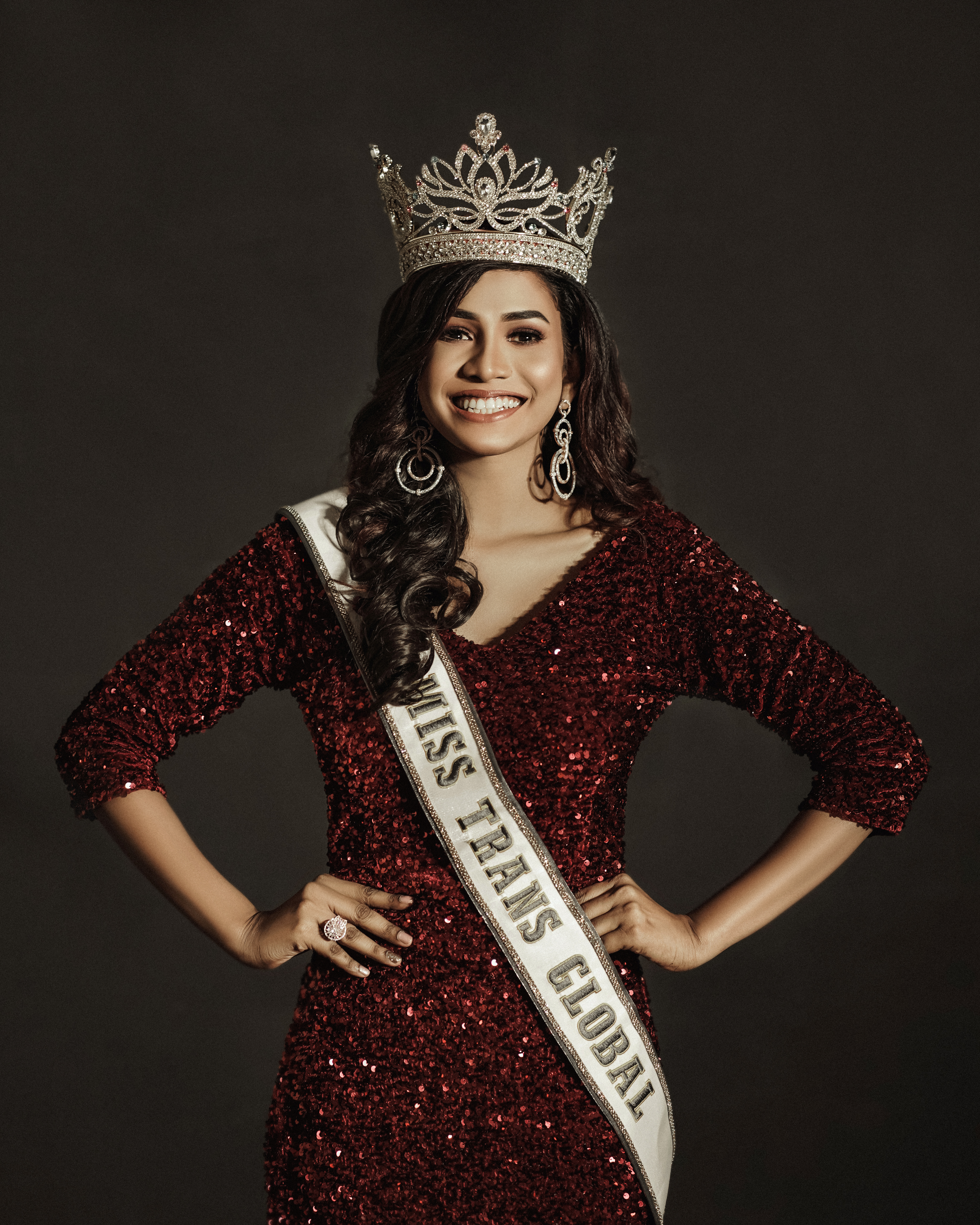
Miss Trans Global 2021
Sruthy Sithara
India

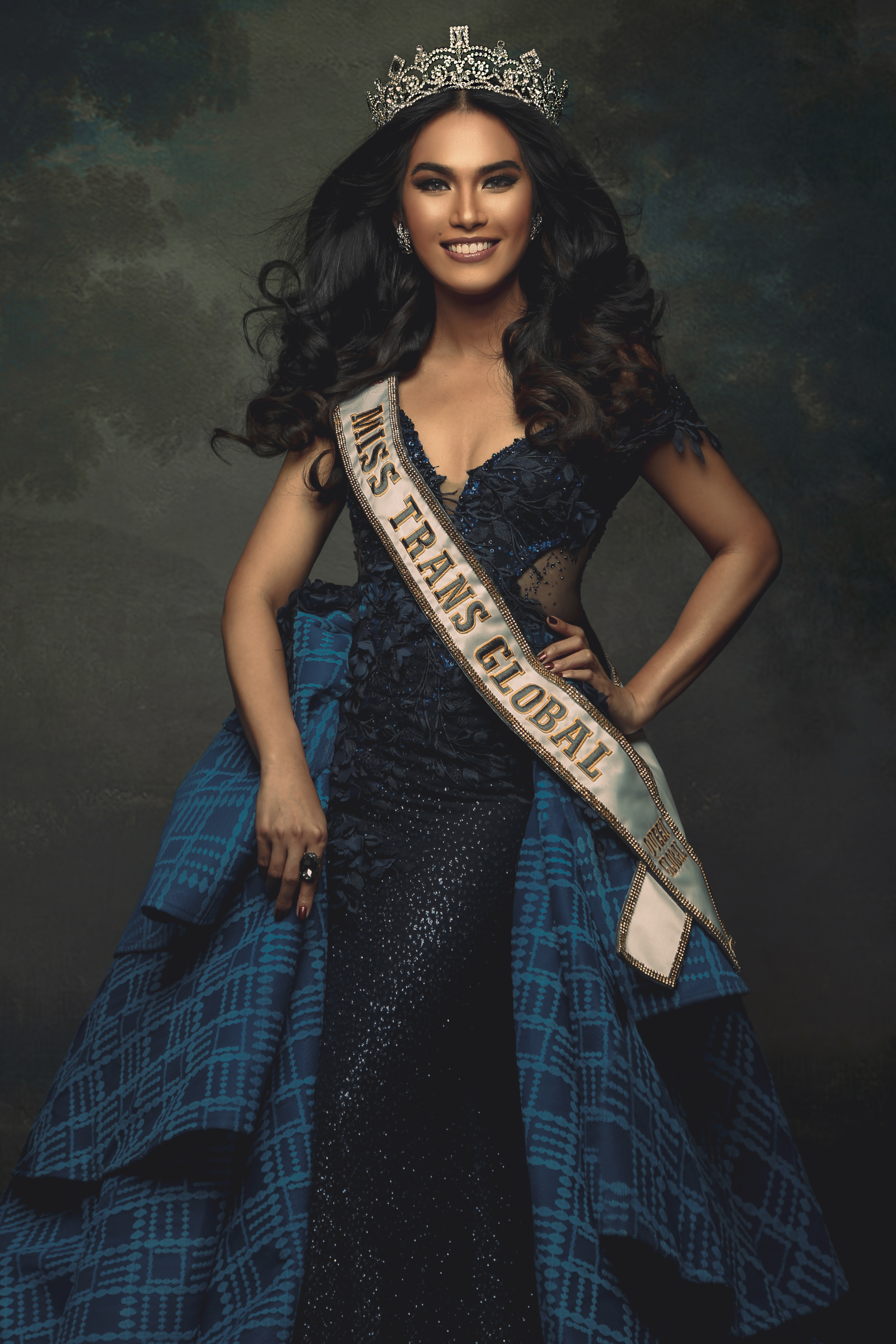
Miss Trans Global 2020
Mela Franco Habijan
Philippines

== Miss Trans Global 2025 Results ==
=== Placements ===
Placement	Contestant
Miss Trans Global 2025 Queen Global	Italy – Laura Pereira
Miss Trans Global Diamond Queen Diamond	United States – Chelsea Page Moses
Miss Trans Global Sapphire Queen Sapphire	Philippines – Pharcy Pugong
Continental Queens
Miss Trans Global Asia	Malaysia – Kyra Rose Griffin
Miss Trans Global Europe	England – Dyosa Diwata
Special Awards
Queen of Hearts	Malaysia – Kyra Rose Griffin
Inspirational Queen of The Year	France – Justine Sainte
Best National Costumes	United States – Chelsea Page Moses
Gifted Idol of The Year	Brazil – Veronika Havenna
Super Model of The Year	Italy – Laura Pereira
Activist Queen of The Year	Philippines – Pharcy Pugong
Glam Beauty of The Year	England – Dyosa Diwata
Eloquent Queen of The Year	Italy – Laura Pereira
Stylish Queen of The Year	United States – Chelsea Page Moses
Popular Goddess of The Year	United States – Chelsea Page Moses
National Director of The Year (Monica Roberts Warrior Award)	United States – Evan Dooley

== Miss Trans Global 2023 Results ==
=== Placements ===
Placement	Contestant
Miss Trans Global 2023	Thailand – Sarocha Akaros
Miss Trans Global 2024 (appointed) Miss Trans Global Diamond	France – Kevhoney Scarlett
Miss Trans Global Sapphire	England – Vivienne Melanie Mesias
Top 5	Canada – Diana Dee Barrera; South Africa – Chedino Rodriguez Martin
Continental Queens
Miss Trans Global Americas	Canada – Diana Dee Barrera
Miss Trans Global Africa	South Africa – Chedino Rodriguez Martin
Special Awards
Queen of Hearts	Wales – Eva Dee Jesus
Queen of The Ball	Argentina – Lucila Thompson
Gifted Idol of The Year	Nigeria – Alexandra Etim
Catwalk Queen of The Year	Scotland – Hardy Jat
Activist Queen of The Year	South Africa – Chedino Rodriguez Martin
Glam Beauty of The Year	England – Vivienne Melanie Mesias
Eloquent Queen of The Year	Thailand – Sarocha Akaros
Stylish Queen of the Year	France – Kevhoney Scarlett
Best National Costume	Italy – Rica Gandara
Popular Goddess of the Year	Canada – Diana Dee Barrera

== Miss Trans Global 2022 Results ==
=== Placements ===
Placement	Contestant
Miss Trans Global 2022	Brazil – Natasha Cardoso
Miss Trans Global Diamond	Canada – Abi Dela Paz Orencia Sytanco
Miss Trans Global Sapphire	Netherlands – Trisha Jose
First Princess Global	Colombia – Virgen Mariana Cortes
Second Princess Global	Philippines – Rojean Buhian
Third Princess Global	Uganda – Amanda Kamanda
Special Awards
Popular Goddess of the Year	Canada – Abi Dela Paz Orencia Sytanco
Best National Costume	Netherlands – Trisha Jose
Stylish Queen of the Year	Canada – Abi Dela Paz Orencia Sytanco
Eloquent Queen of The Year	Colombia – Virgen Mariana Cortes
Glam Beauty of The Year	Philippines – Rojean Buhian
Inspirational Queen of The Year	Uganda – Amanda Kamanda
Super Model of The Year	Brazil – Natasha Cardoso
Time Keeper of The Year	Netherlands – Trisha Jose
Queen of Hearts - (Chosen by participants)	Canada – Abi Dela Paz Orencia Sytanco
Monica Roberts Warrior National Director of The Year	Philippines – Yanyan Araña

== Miss Trans Global 2021 Results ==
=== Placements ===
Placement	Contestant
Miss Trans Global 2021	India – Sruthy Sithara
Duchess Global	Philippines – Albiean Revalde
Marchioness Global	Canada – Viviana Santibanez
Countess Global	Malaysia – Fazelyn Jaafar
Baroness Global	Mauritius – Karla Michelle-Delprado
1st Princess Global	Indonesia – Amanda Sandova
2nd Princess Global	Peru – Lesly Quispe
Top 9	Ghana – Charlene MacCarthy-Crabbe; United Kingdom – Vera Nicholle Joren
Top 13	Armenia – Monica Sarkisyan; Australia – Addison Joy Harper; Japan – Bianca Sumi; Mexico – Lorena Barajas
Continental Queens
Miss Trans Global Asia-Pacific	Indonesia – Amanda Sandova
Miss Trans Global Americas	Peru – Lesly Quispe
Miss Trans Global Europe	United Kingdom – Vera Nicholle Joren
Miss Trans Global Africa	Ghana – Charlene MacCarthy-Crabbe
Special Awards
Popular Goddess Of The Year	Mauritius – Karla Michelle-Delprado
Activist Queen Of The Year	Canada – Viviana Santibanez; Malaysia – Fazelyn Jaafar; Peru – Lesly Quispe; Philippines – Albiean Revalde
Best National Costume	Philippines – Albiean Revalde
Stylish Queen of the Year	Peru – Lesly Quispe
Eloquent Queen of The Year	India – Sruthy Sithara; Philippines – Albiean Revalde
Inspirational Queen of The Year	Canada – Viviana Santibanez; Japan – Bianca Sumi; United Kingdom – Vera Nicholle Joren
Gifted Idol of The Year	Ghana – Charlene MacCarthy-Crabbe; Mexico – Lorena Barajas
Super Model of The Year	Mexico – Lorena Barajas
Glam Beauty of The Year	Armenia – Monica Sarkisyan
Time Keeper of The Year	Canada – Viviana Santibanez
Queen of Hearts - (Chosen by participants)	Indonesia – Amanda Sandova
Best National Crowning Moment of The Year	Indonesia – Amanda Sandova
Monica Roberts Warrior National Director of The Year	Philippines – Janlee Dungca
Remainder
Brazil	Mirelly Rocha
Nigeria	Adanna Electra-Joels
Romania	Ariela Stanciu

==== Gallery of Miss Trans Global 2021 winners ====
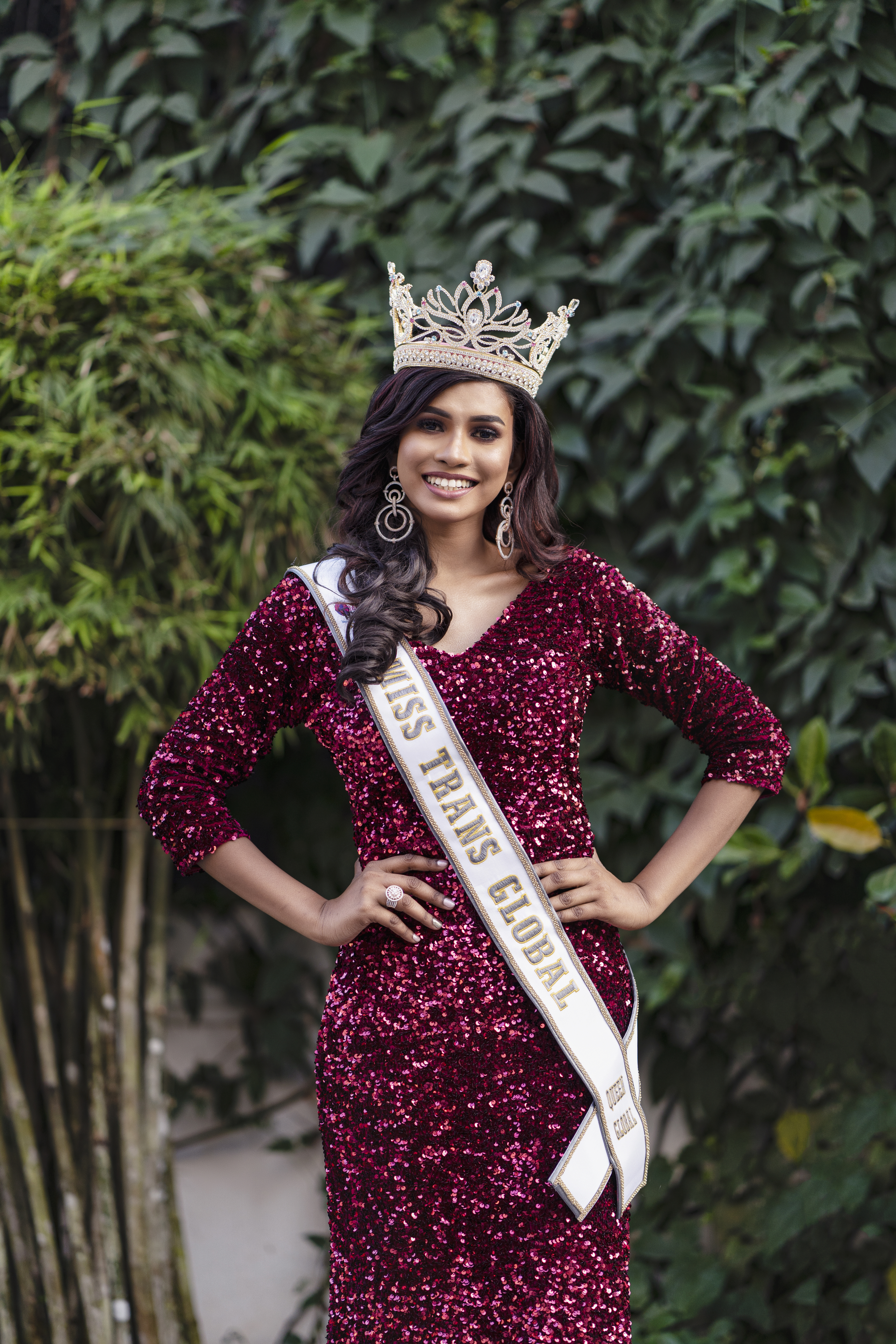
Miss Trans Global 2021
Sruthy Sithara
India

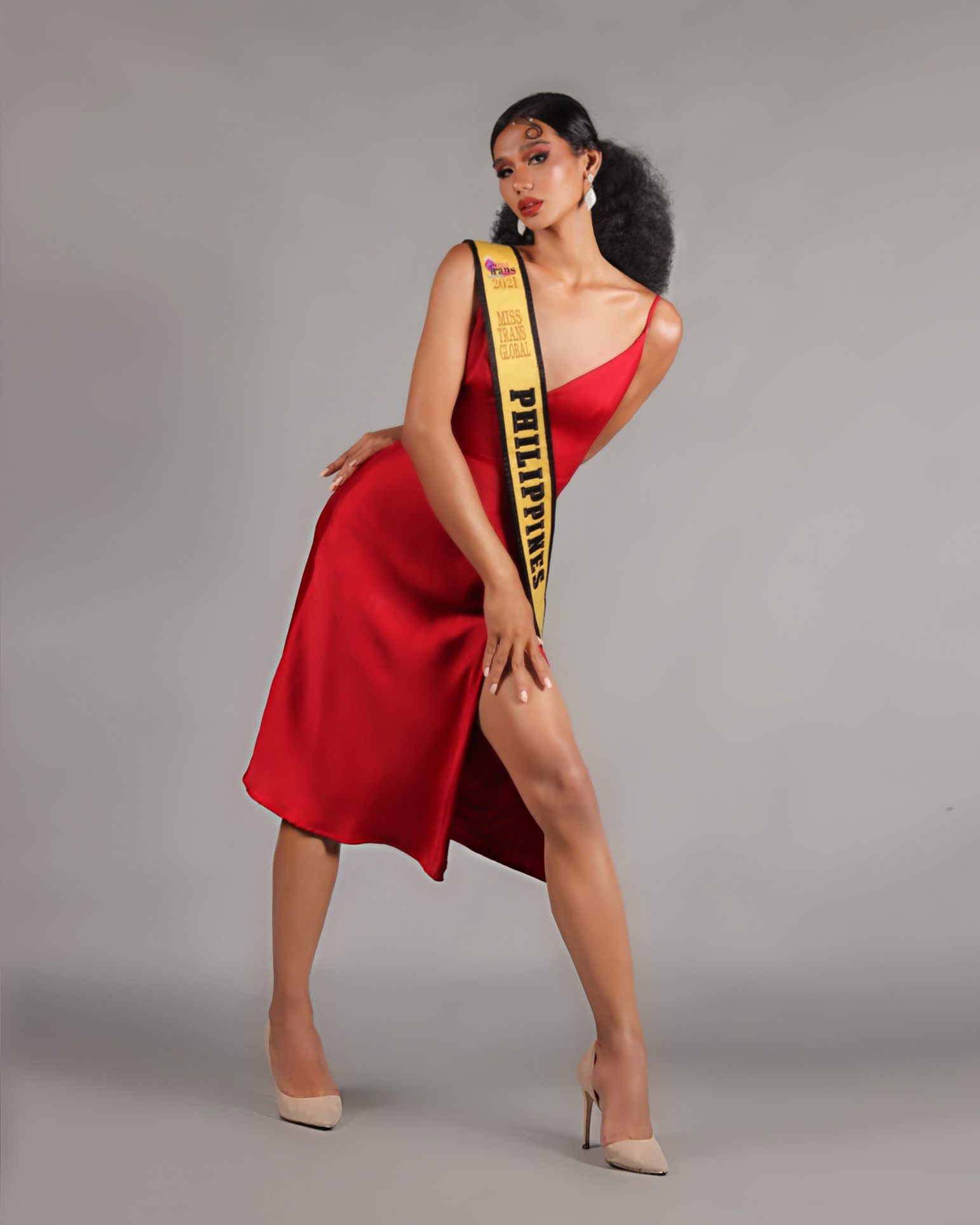
Duchess Global 2021
Albiean Revalde
Philippines

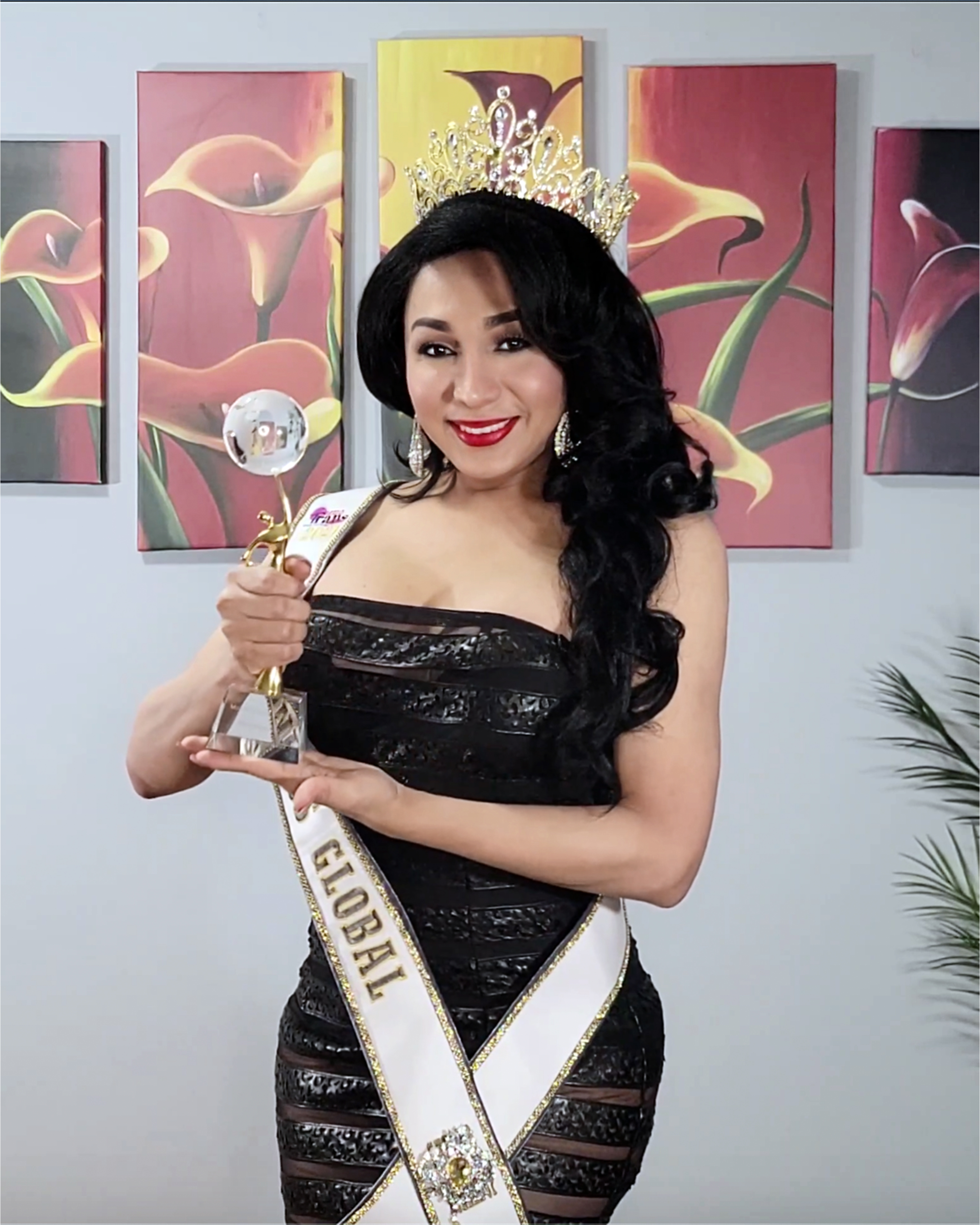
Marchioness Global 2021
Viviana Santibanez
Canada

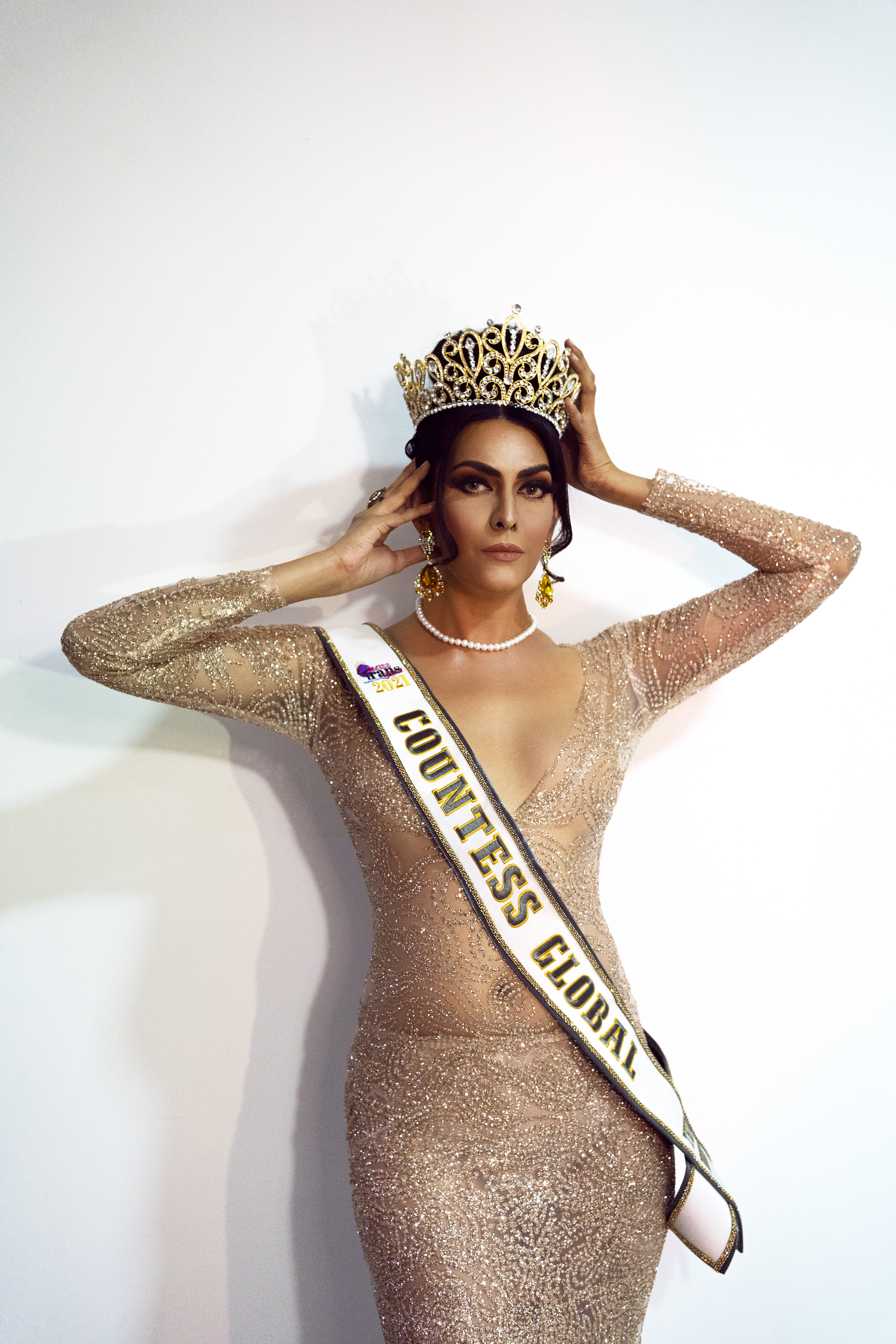
Countess Global 2021
Fazelyn Jaafar
Malaysia

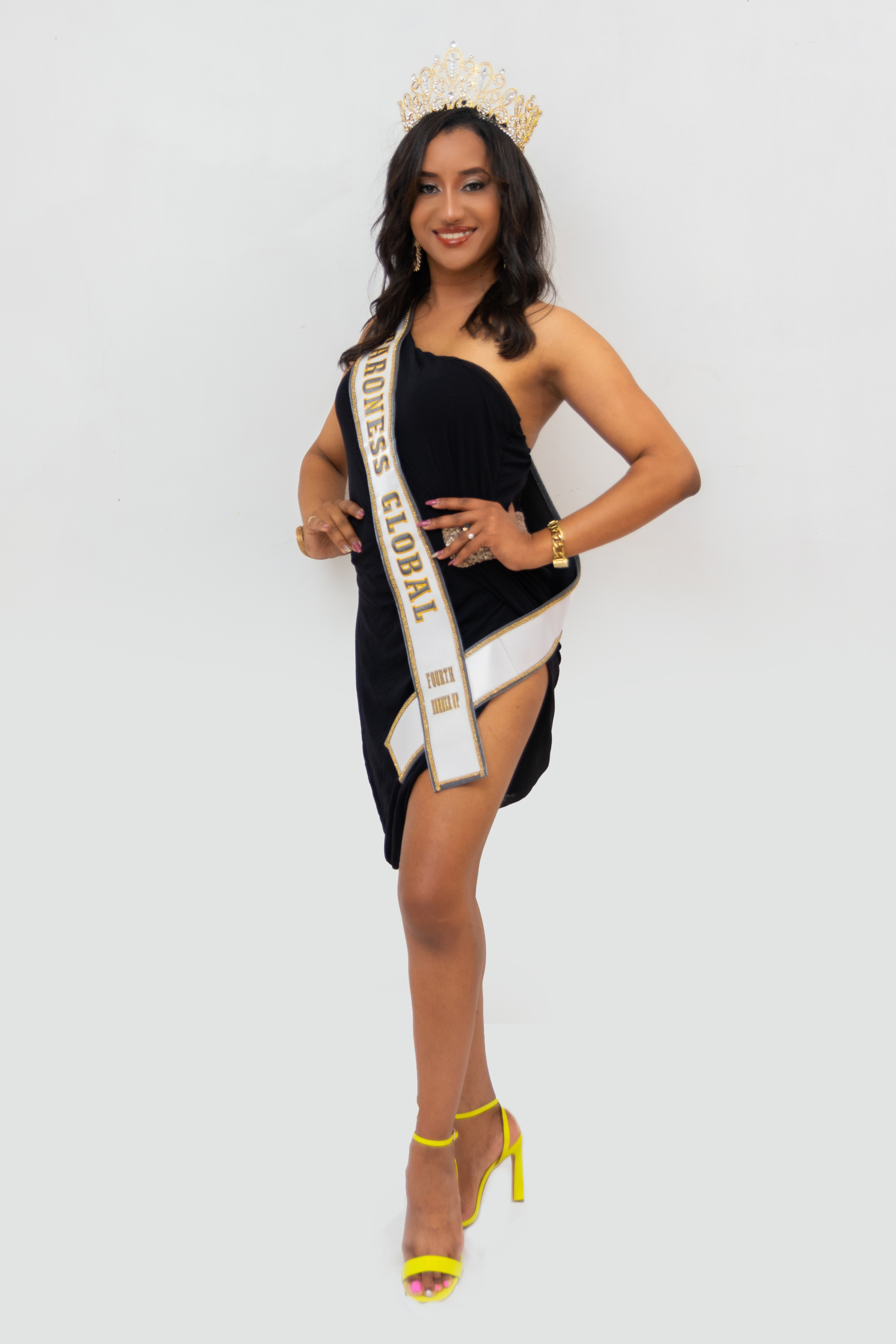
Baroness Global 2021
Karla Michelle-Delprado
Mauritius

== Miss Trans Global 2020 Results ==
=== Placements ===
Placement	Contestant
Miss Trans Global 2020	Philippines – Mela Franco Habijan
Duchess Global	Australia – Rebeckah Loveday
Marchioness Global	Ghana – Veso Golden
Countess Global	South Africa – Semakaleng Sma Mothapo
Baroness Global	Sweden – Danielly Drugge
Top 10	Philippines – Maria Thompson; Nigeria – Diva Buchi; Canada – Thalia Altura; United States – Kamilla Acevedo; Philippines – Nina Marie Similatan
Top 15	Australia – Amy; United States – Alhya; India – Victoria; Philippines – Aloha; Philippines – Nikki
Special Awards
Eloquent Queen of The Year – Fast track to Top 15 – Judge	Philippines – Mela Franco Habijan
Glam Beauty of The Year – Fast track to Top 15 – Judge	Philippines – Mela Franco Habijan
Super Model of The Year – Fast track to Top 15 – Judge	Philippines – Mela Franco Habijan
Gifted Idol of The Year – Fast track to Top 15 – Judge	Ghana – Veso Golden
Stylish Star of the Year – Fast track to Top 15 – Judge	Ghana – Veso Golden
Popular Goddess of The Year – Fast track to Top 15 – Public	Philippines – Nina Marie Similatan
Queen of Hearts – Fast track to Top 10 – Contestant	Sweden – Danielly Drugge
Remainder
Australia	Hunny
Nigeria	Jasmine
Uruguay	Renata

==== Gallery of Miss Trans Global 2020 winners ====
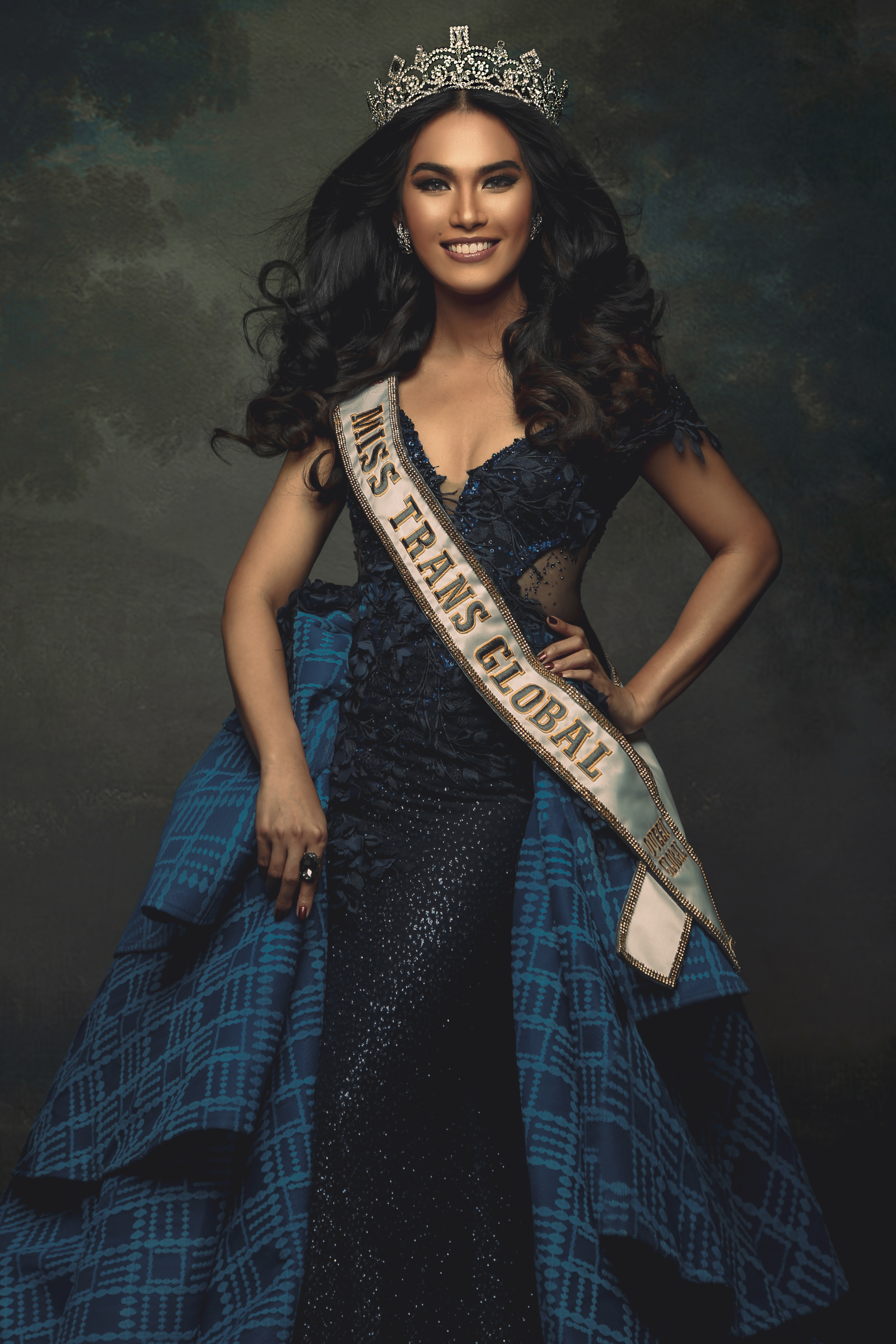
Miss Trans Global 2020
Mela Franco Habijan
Philippines

Duchess Global 2020
Rebeckah Loveday
Australia

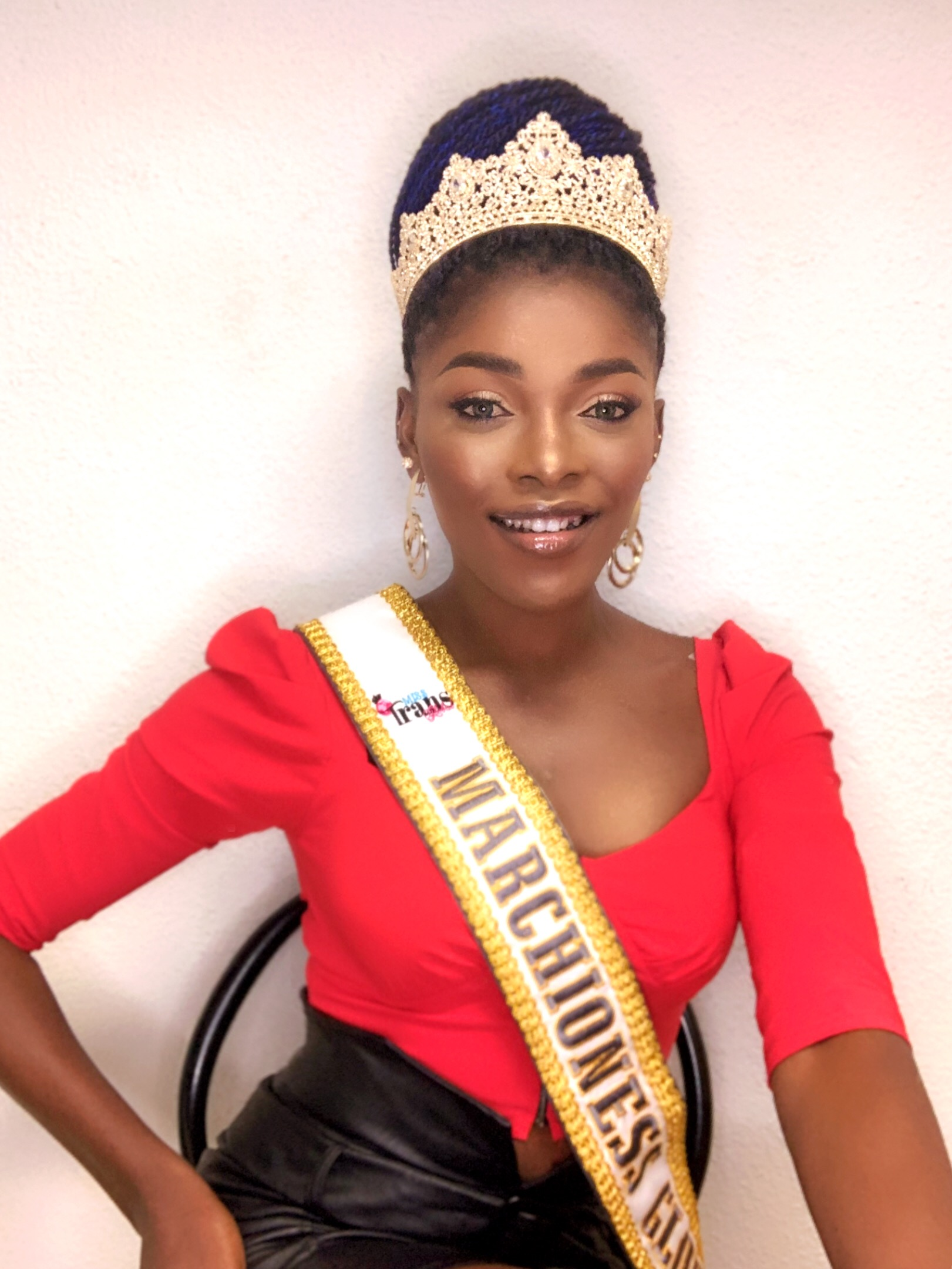
Marchioness Global 2020
Veso Golden
Ghana

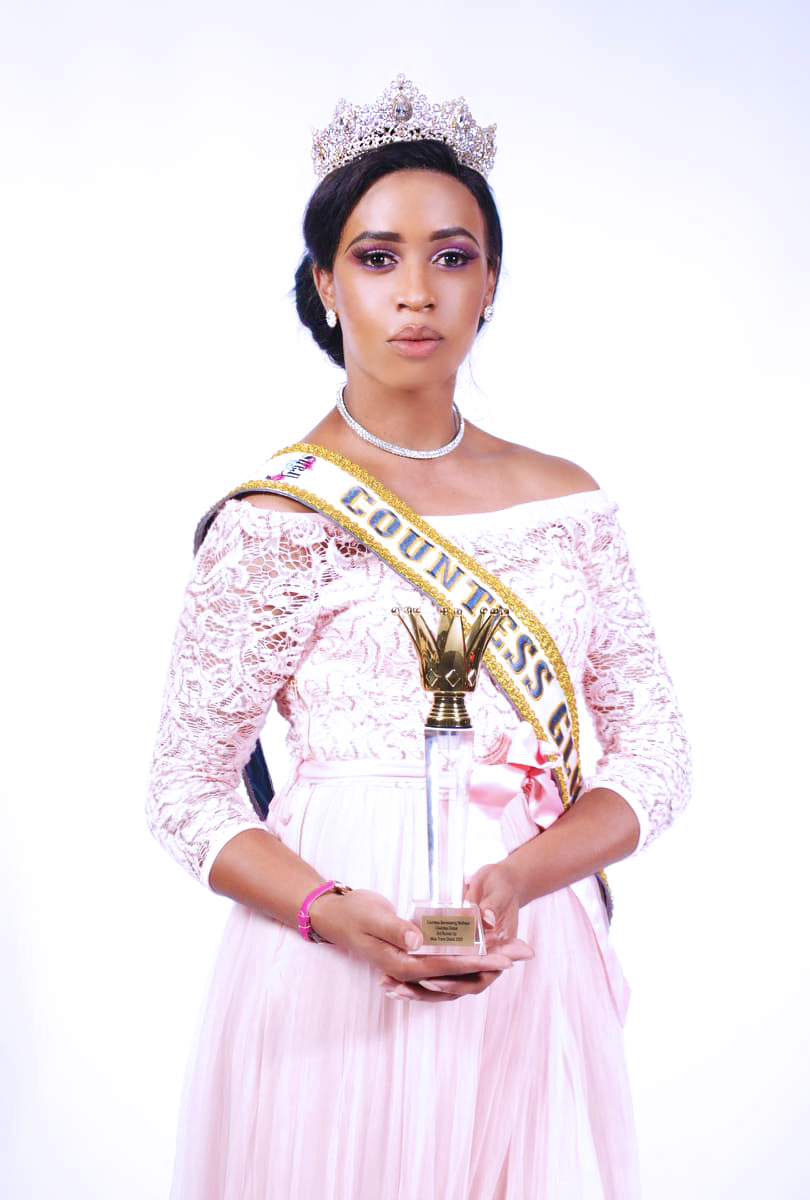
Countess Global 2020
Semakaleng Sma Mothapo
South Africa

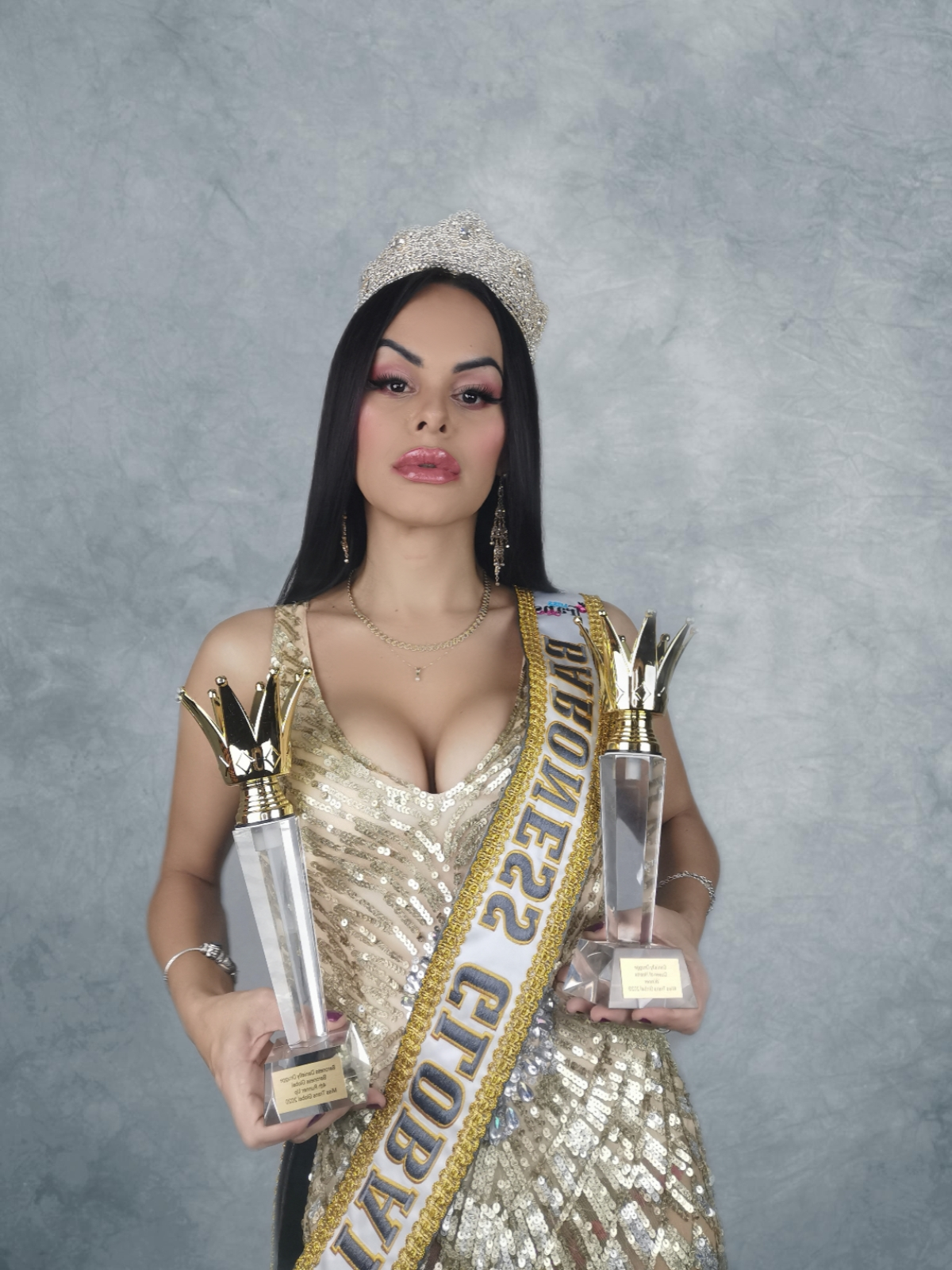
Baroness Global 2020
Danielly Drugge
Sweden

== See also ==
- List of beauty contests
- Miss Trans Star International
- Miss Continental
- Miss T World
- Super Sireyna Worldwide
- Miss Trans Israel
- Miss Trans Albania
