= The Belle from Gaza =

2024 film by Yolande Zauberman

- Theatrical release poster
- French: La Belle de Gaza
- Directed by: Yolande Zauberman
- Written by: Yolande Zauberman
- Produced by: Bruno Nahon; Yolande Zauberman
- Starring: Talleen Abu Hanna; Israela; Nadine; Danielle; Nathalie
- Cinematography: Yolande Zauberman
- Edited by: Rafael Torres Calderón; Yolande Zauberman; Léo Richard
- Production companies: Unité; Phobics; Arte France Cinéma
- Distributed by: Pyramide Distribution
- Release dates: 17 May 2024 (Cannes); 29 May 2024 (France)
- Running time: 76 minutes
- Country: France
- Languages: English; Arabic; French; Hebrew
- Box office: $74,847

The Belle from Gaza (French: La Belle de Gaza) is a 2024 French documentary film written, shot, co-edited, co-produced and directed by Yolande Zauberman. The film follows Zauberman's pursuit of a trans woman who traveled on foot to Tel Aviv from Gaza.

It had its world premiere in the Special Screenings section at the 77th Cannes Film Festival on 17 May 2024, where it competed for the L'Œil d'or and Queer Palm. It was theatrically released on 29 May 2024 by Pyramide Distribution.

== Premise ==
The Belle from Gaza is a documentary film about transgender women in Israel. In it, Yolande Zauberman investigates the legend of a young girl who, threatened in the streets and rejected by her family because of her trans identity, reportedly fled the Gaza Strip to travel on foot to Tel Aviv.

Filmed on Hatnufa Street in Tel Aviv, the documentary interweaves the often tragic lives of several transgender women, some of whom are prostitutes. Israela, who comes from an Orthodox Jewish background, tells the story of her marriage to a rabbi, to whom she confessed being trans when she wanted a divorce. Danielle, who came from the Palestinian territories, was kidnapped by men from her hometown. She survived but her mother told her, "I regret that they didn't kill you". Conversely, Talleen Abu Hanna, winner of Miss Trans Israel in 2016, feels accepted and expresses her gratitude to her country.

== Release ==
The film was selected to be screened in the Special Screenings section at the 77th Cannes Film Festival, where it had its world premiere on 17 May 2024.

The film was released in France on 29 May 2024 by Pyramide Distribution, with the company's sales arm Pyramide International handling world sales for the film.

The film was also screened at the opening night of TLVFest 2024.

== Reception ==
=== Critical response ===
On AlloCiné, the film received an average rating of 3.7 out of 5, based on 24 reviews from French critics.

=== Accolades ===
Award	Date of ceremony	Category	Recipient(s)	Result	Ref.
Cannes Film Festival	24 May 2024	L'Œil d'or	Yolande Zauberman	Nominated	
Cannes Film Festival	25 May 2024	Queer Palm	Yolande Zauberman	Nominated	
