= M (2018 French film) =

2018 film by Yolande Zauberman

- Theatrical release poster
- Directed by: Yolande Zauberman
- Written by: Yolande Zauberman
- Produced by: Charles Gillibert; Fabrice Bigio; Yolande Zauberman
- Starring: Menachem Lang; Talleen Abu Hanna
- Edited by: Raphaël Lefèvre
- Production companies: CG Cinéma; Phobics Films
- Distributed by: New Story
- Release dates: 6 August 2018 (Locarno Film Festival); 20 March 2019 (France)
- Running time: 105 minutes
- Country: France
- Languages: Hebrew, Yiddish, English

M is a 2018 French documentary film directed by Yolande Zauberman. It follows Menachem Lang, aged 35, as he returns to Bnei Brak to confront the men who abused him as a child, to discuss child abuse with other members of the ultra-Orthodox community and to attempt to reconcile with his parents.

In 2020 it received the César Award for Best Documentary Film.

== Cast ==
- Talleen Abu Hanna as Self
