= Sexuality in Palestine =

Sexuality in Palestine encompasses the sexual norms and practices present within Palestinian society. While sexuality is generally considered a taboo topic, several studies have been conducted to better understand the nature of sexuality in Palestine.

== Sex education ==
A report by the United Nations Population Fund (UNPFA) described sexual and reproductive health curricula in the Palestinian territories as basic, with the coverage of the curricula being inconsistent among schools and educators. In spite of the lack of sex education, Palestinian youth overwhelmingly are in favor of including age appropriate sex education in school curricula.

In a 2020 online survey of 861 Palestinian youths, 72% of respondents were in favor of sex education being provided before the age of 16, and 29% of particants were in favor of age appropriate sex education being provided from the age of 4.

== Sexual activity among Palestinian youth ==
Despite living in a conservative society in which sexual activities outside of marriage are discouraged, Palestinian youths report such activities to be more common than is assumed. In one study, participants reported oral and anal sex being more common than vaginal sex among youth, due to the pressure to maintain virginity (specifically in terms of penile-vaginal penetration) before marriage.

Reasons provided for engaging in sexual activities before marriage included a desire to challenge societal norms, for personal pleasure, to relieve psychological tension in the context of the ongoing conflict, and an inability to marry due to financial constraints.

== Prostitution ==
Even though prostitution is illegal in the Palestinian territories, clandestine brothels have been known to operate in Ramallah and East Jeruselum. Furthermore, Palestinian men are known to visit brothels in Israel.

== Pornography ==
There is limited information regarding the use of and attitudes towards pornography within the Palestinian territories. However, in one online survey, 71% of Palestinian females and 81% of Palestinian males agreed with the statement "pornographic material does not reflect the real relationship between men and women".

In his book Son of Hamas (2010), Mosab Hassan Yousef described the existence of pornographic theatres in the West Bank during the 1970s.

In 2012, Hamas asked the 10 main internet service providers (ISPs) in Gaza to block pornographic websites.

== See also ==
- Sexuality in Islam
