= Sparks Camp =

- Genre: Reality television Dating show
- Created by: Black Sheep Productions
- Written by: Patrick Valencia; Daniel Saniana
- Directed by: Theodore Boborol
- Presented by: Mela Habijan
- Country of origin: Philippines
- No. of seasons: 4
- No. of episodes: 32

Production
- Running time: 32–72 minutes
- Production company: Black Sheep Productions

Original release
- Network: YouTube
- Release: May 24, 2023 – September 17, 2025
- Network: iWant
- Release: September 16, 2026 – present

Sparks Camp is a Philippine dating reality television series produced by Black Sheep Productions and broadcast on YouTube. Hosted by Mela Habijan and featuring exclusively queer men, it aired on Black Sheep's YouTube channel for season 1 from May 24 to July 12, 2023 and for season 2 from June 26, 2024 to August 14, 2024. The show moved to ABS-CBN Entertainment's YouTube channel for season 3 from July 16 to September 3, 2025. The Reunion episode aired on August 1, 2023, September 4, 2024 and September 17, 2025. The series has been renewed for a fourth season and premiered on Septemeber 16, 2026 on iWant.

== Production ==
Sparks Camp was produced under Black Sheep Productions, a subsidiary under ABS-CBN Films. Creative Head Hyro Aguinaldo and Director Theodore Boborol reportedly faced may difficulties in getting the concept for Sparks Camp an LGBTQ dating show approved. The good reception of the boy's love web series Hello Stranger was cited as the reason for the conceptualization of Sparks Camp.

For season one, the show was filmed nearby the lake of Laguna; for season two it was in a beach in Pangasinan. For season three it was filmed in a mountainside setting.

== Background ==
Sparks Camp is open to male queer participants throughout its three seasons including homosexual, bisexual, and pansexual men who are refer to in-show as campers. Each season at least had ten campers. Each participants take part in various various challenges or games with the winner able to earn a chance to earn date a fellow camper. There is no elimination or overall winners as all campers in each season remain in throughout the run.

The dating show is facilitated by Mela Habijan, a trans woman who takes on the persona of "Mother Sparker", a maternal figure to the campers. She has been the host in all three seasons.

=== Campers ===
(Ages stated are at start of contest)

Season	Name	Age	Hometown	Occupation	Status
Season 1 (2023)	Aaron Maniego	24	Rizal	Content creator	Ep. 1-8
Season 1 (2023)	Alex De Ungria	22	Muntinlupa	College student	Ep. 1-8
Season 1 (2023)	Bong Gonzales	23	Pasig	Aspiring actor	Ep. 1-8
Season 1 (2023)	Dan Galman	24	Quezon City	Law student	Ep. 1-8
Season 1 (2023)	Gabe Balita	23	Quezon City	Student jock	Ep. 1-8
Season 1 (2023)	Justin Macapallag	21	Quezon City	Biology student	Ep. 1-8
Season 1 (2023)	Karl Bautista	31	Parañaque	Architect	Ep. 1-8
Season 1 (2023)	Nat Magbitang	24	Laguna	Medical student	Ep. 1-8
Season 1 (2023)	Nick Deocampo	25	Negros Occidental	Business owner	Ep. 1-8
Season 1 (2023)	Stanley Bawalan	25	Baguio	Virtual assistant	Ep.1-8
	Name	Age	Hometown	Occupation	Status
Season 2 (2024)	Allan Pangilinan	29	Pampanga	Advocacy manager	Ep. 1-8
Season 2 (2024)	Ejay Dimayacyac	29	Batangas	Graphic artist	Ep. 1-8
Season 2 (2024)	Kyle Adlawan	27	Manila	Content creator	Ep. 1-8
Season 2 (2024)	Martin Chua	29	Quezon City	Ops manager	Ep. 1-8
Season 2 (2024)	Miggy Ruallo	24	Las Piñas	Film graduate	Ep. 1-8
Season 2 (2024)	Paco Laurel Sanz	28	Quezon City	UI/UX designer	Ep. 2-8
Season 2 (2024)	Pipoy Oreiro	25	North Cotabato	Law student	Ep. 1-8
Season 2 (2024)	Seichi Orazaga	23	Cavite	ChemE student	Ep. 2-8
Season 2 (2024)	Universe Ramos	29	United States	Entrepreneur	Ep. 1-8
Season 2 (2024)	Zuher Bautista	37	Pasig	Model	Ep. 1-8
	Name	Age	Hometown	Occupation	Status
Season 3 (2025)	Aaron Aberasturi	29	Cebu	Public ad graduate	Ep. 1-8
Season 3 (2025)	Andrew Rabin	28	United States	Pilot	Ep. 1-8
Season 3 (2025)	Ants Pedregosa	29	North Cotabato	Ops manager	Ep. 1-8
Season 3 (2025)	Edward Maalihan	27	Bulacan	Content creator	Ep. 1-8
Season 3 (2025)	Harold Espiritu	26	Cavite	Performer	Ep. 1-8
Season 3 (2025)	Joer Reyes	38	Quezon City	Chief creative	Ep. 1-8
Season 3 (2025)	Julian Agustin	26	Muntinlupa	Content creator	Ep. 1-8
Season 3 (2025)	Julio Silvestre	29	Quezon City	Wrestler	Ep. 1-8
Season 3 (2025)	Khali Empleo	28	Manila	Flight attendant	Ep. 1-8
Season 3 (2025)	Kim Bejerano	23	Quezon City	Brand strategist	Ep.1-8
	Name	Age	Hometown	Occupation	Status
Season 4 (2026)	Beej Mordeno	31	Agusan del Norte	Freelance IT	Ep. 1-
Season 4 (2026)	EJ Magistrado	26	Bulacan	Infrastructure analyst	Ep. 1-
Season 4 (2026)	Gio Lopez	30	Mandaluyong	Cafe manager	Ep. 2-
Season 4 (2026)	Howie Johnson	31	United States	Business graduate	Ep. 2-
Season 4 (2026)	Ian Lubrica	23	Baguio	Drag queen	Ep. 1-
Season 4 (2026)	Joaquin Espiritu	31	Caloocan	Flight attendant	Ep. 1-
Season 4 (2026)	Jury Fajardo	26	Rizal	Quality officer	Ep. 1-
Season 4 (2026)	Michael Padiernos	22	Pangasinan	Nursing student	Ep. 1-
Season 4 (2026)	Taku Morita	26	Japan	Social media marketer	Ep. 1-
Season 4 (2026)	Tommy Alejandrino	24	Quezon City	Actor	Ep. 1-

== Music ==
"Sa’Yo Ang Mundo" by the five-person troupe Nameless Kids was selected as Sparks Camp's original sound track in 2023. On the third season, a new theme song was introduced through "Nahuhulog" which was performed by Chie from The Voice Teens.

== Release ==
There has been three seasons of Sparks Camp. The first two season has been released in Black Sheep's YouTube channel. While season three has been released in the ABS-CBN Entertainment YouTube channel. The first ever episode was released on May 24, 2025. The fourth season will release exclusively on iWant.

== Reception ==
Year	Award	Category	Nominee	Result	Ref.
2024	ContentAsia Awards	Best Original Reality and/or Competition Programme	Sparks Camp	Nominated	
