= Would You Have Sex with an Arab? =

- Film poster
- Directed by: Yolande Zauberman
- Written by: Yolande Zauberman, Sélim Nassib
- Produced by: Yves Chanvillard, Orly Dahan, Natacha Delmon Casanova, Jean-Luc Ormieres
- Distributed by: Urban Distribution
- Release dates: September 2011 (Venice); September 12, 2012
- Running time: 85 minutes
- Languages: French, Hebrew, Arabic, English

Would You Have Sex with an Arab? is a feature-length documentary film by French director Yolande Zauberman. It premiered at the 2011 Venice Film Festival, and released in France on 12 September 2012.

== Overview ==
Shot in Israel, the film is an orchestration of interviews with people who all answer the same questions posed by the author – "Would you have sex with an Arab?" and "Would you have sex with an Israeli Jew?". Most, if not all of the scenes are shot at night in dance clubs, bars, cafes, public spaces, and personal homes in Tel Aviv, Israel. Interviews are conducted in French, Hebrew, Arabic, and English. The film is currently available with both French and English subtitles.

== Location ==
Zauberman has said that she chose Tel Aviv as the site of her documentary because the city feels “guilty of nothing” and “has a certain blindness to it.” Zauberman said that in the past she sometimes “felt the incapacity to understand, to realize what happens in the rest of the country,” in Tel Aviv and “that is why there is a very special way of looking at Arabic [sic] people” in the city.

== Production ==
Zaumberman personally conducted interviews accompanied by two production crew carrying a light, a microphone, and an unobtrusive handheld camera. The crew spoke English, French, Hebrew and Arabic and thus were able to communicate with many of those interviewed in their native tongues; however, the majority of the interviews are conducted in English and Hebrew.

== Dedication ==
The documentary is dedicated to Zauberman’s close friend Juliano Mer-Khamis, the Arab-Israeli actor, director, and political activist featured in the film. Mer-Khamis was murdered in front of his “Theater of Freedom” in the Palestinian refugee camp of Jenin in the West Bank on April 4, 2011. He was shot five times by masked militants believed to be Muslim Palestinians.

Mer Khamis was born and raised in Nazareth. His mother, Arna Mer, was an Israeli Jewish activist for Palestinian rights. His father, Saliba Khamis, was a Christian Palestinian.

== Awards ==
Would You Have Sex with an Arab? was selected at the 68th Venice International Film Festival in 2011.
