= Talleen Abu Hanna =

Israeli-Arab beauty pageant winner

- Born: 30 July 1994 (age 32); Nazareth, Northern District, Israel
- Occupations: model, actress, beauty pageant winner, television personality
- Height: 180 cm (5 ft 11 in)
- Beauty pageant titleholder
- Title: Miss Trans Israel 2016
- Hair color: Brown
- Eye color: Green
- Major competitions: Miss Trans Israel 2016 (Winner); Miss Star International 2016 (1st Runner-Up); Miss Israel 2018 (4th place)

Talleen Abu Hanna (Arabic: تالین ابو حنا, Hebrew: תאלין אבו חנא; born 30 July 1994) is an Israeli-Arab actress, model, tv host and beauty pageant titleholder. In 2016 she was crowned the first-ever Miss Trans Israel and placed first runner-up at Miss Star International. In 2018, she competed in Miss Israel. Abu Hanna was a contestant on the Israeli reality television series Big Brother and the reality series Goalstar and starred in the 2024 documentary film The Belle from Gaza.

== Early life ==
Abu Hanna was born in Nazareth to a Catholic Israeli Arab family. She has two sisters. Abu Hanna grew up in Nazareth and identifies as both Israeli and Palestinian.

Abu Hanna studied dance and theatre as a child. She came out as a transgender woman when she was fourteen years old. Following her coming out, she moved to Tel Aviv in order to transition.

== Career ==
In 2016, she won the first-ever Miss Trans Israel pageant, the first transgender beauty competition in Israel. Abu Hanna was crowned Miss Trans Israel at Habima Theater, Israel's national theater. She went on to represent Israel at Miss Star International in Barcelona in August 2016. She placed first runner-up in the international competition. Following the pageant, she appeared as a contestant on the reality television show Big Brother and on the reality show Goalstar.

On 8 May 2017, Abu Hanna attended a reception at Beit HaNassi in Jerusalem and met with Israeli President Reuven Rivlin. In June 2017, she gave an address at a Pride Month event hosted at the Embassy of Israel, Washington, D.C. She has spoken to transgender youth at shelters in Tel Aviv and at Casa Ruby, an LGBTQ community center in Washington, D.C.

She modeled in an advertisement campaign for the Spanish fashion label Desigual.

In 2018, Abu Hanna competed in the Miss Israel pageant.

On 17 May 2024 Abu Hanna participated in the Cannes International Film Festival, having starred in the documentary film The Belle from Gaza, directed by French director Yolande Zauberman.

Abu Hanna works as a model and actress and teaches dance classes.

== Personal life ==
On 10 October 2016, Abu Hanna underwent gender-affirming surgery at Kamol Cosmetic Hospital in Thailand.

Abu Hanna is a practicing Catholic.

== Filmography ==
Year	Title	Role	Notes
2024	The Belle from Gaza	Herself	Documentary
