= Efrat Tilma =

Israeli transgender activist

- אפרת טילמה
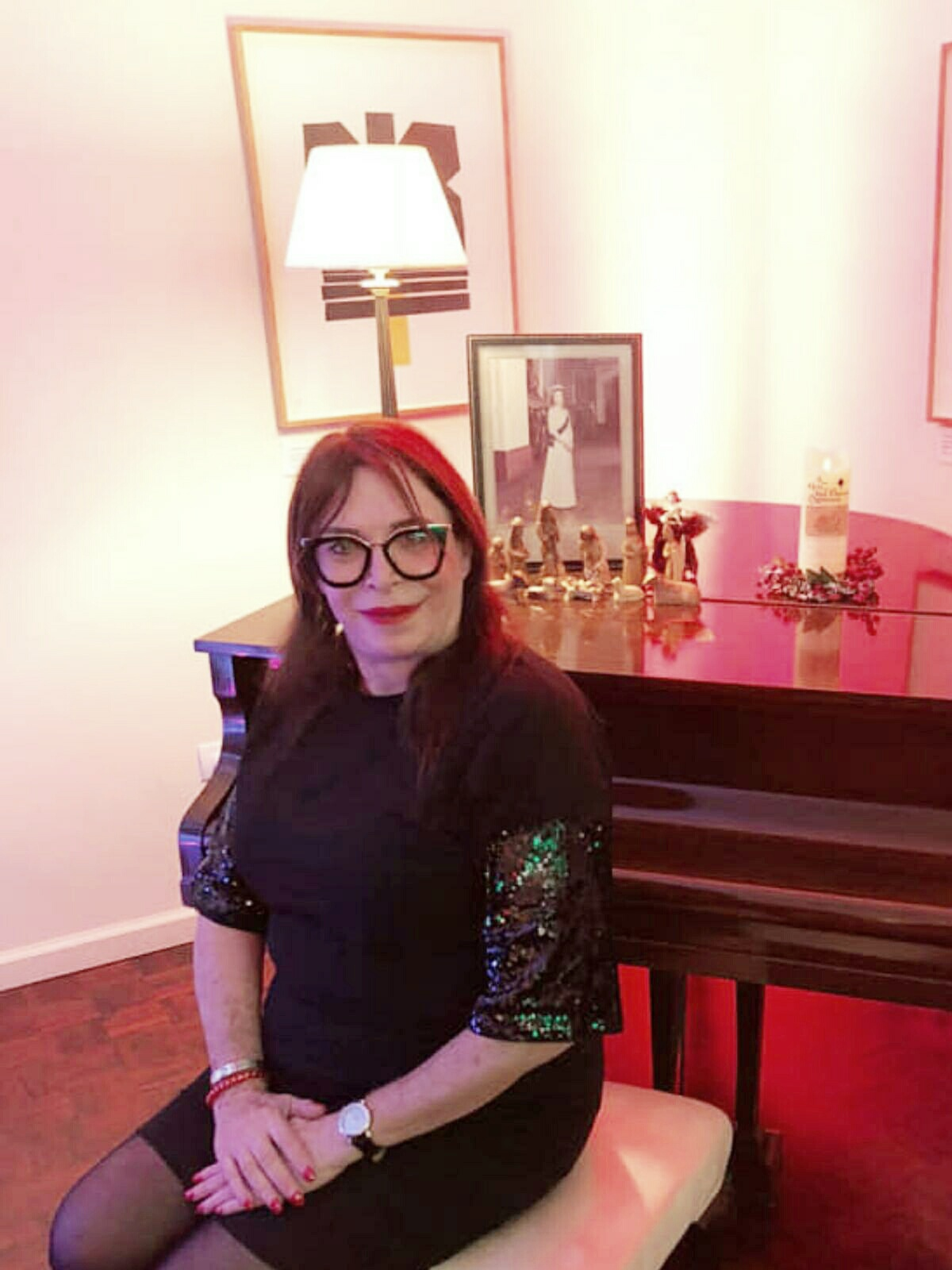
- Tilma in 2017
- Born: 10 September 1947 (age 79); Tel Aviv, Mandatory Palestine
- Occupations: police woman; activist; actress; writer; speaker
- Awards: Tel Aviv-Yafo honorary citizenship

Efrat Anne Tilma (Hebrew: אפרת טילמה; born 1947) is an Israeli transgender activist and the first trans woman to volunteer in the Israel Police. A play based on her autobiography, entitled Made He a Woman, was performed at Habima Theatre, the national theatre of Israel. In 2019, Tilma became the first transgender woman to receive honorary citizenship of Tel Aviv in recognition of her public work.

== Biography ==
Tilma was born in a kibbutz in Galilee, northern Israel; when she was a teenager, she and her family moved to Ramat Aviv, a neighbourhood of Tel Aviv. During the 1960s, Tilma first started dressing as a woman; this led to conflicts with the Israeli police, who considered her to be a man dressed as a woman. Tilma subsequently shared that during this period she had been raped.

In 1967, Tilma underwent gender reassignment surgery in Casablanca, Morocco, due to the procedure being illegal in Israel at the time. She subsequently had to undergo physical examinations by the Israeli Ministry of Interior in order to have her official paperwork changed to reflect her new gender identity.

Between 2010 and 2012, there were several publicized incidents in Israel wherein police officers mistreated transgender sex workers, including by referring to them as the wrong gender. This, along with the suicide of a close transgender friend of Tilma, led to her publicly coming out as a transgender woman. Tilma has gone on to give lectures to the police about working with the transgender community, for which she was awarded a District Medal by the Tel Aviv District of the Israel Police in May 2017; at the ceremony, an official apology was also given by the police for their treatment of transgender people. That same year, Tilma was among a group of people who met then-President Reuben Rivlin at an event commemorating LGBT members of the Israel Police and the Israeli Defense Forces.

In 2016, Tilma served as a judge at the Miss Trans Israel pageant. The winner, Thalin Abu Hanna, went on to play Tilma in Made He a Woman.

In August 2018, Tilma was featured in a calendar of Israeli women dressed as influential women from around the world. Tilma's photo featured her as Tamara Adrián, the first transgender woman elected to political office in Venezuela.

In December 2022, Tilma was named by the BBC as one of its 100 Women of that year for her activism for the transgender community in Israel.

Movies:

The First Lady, 90 min., directed by Udi Nir und Sagi Bornstein, beetz brothers film production, arte, NDR, KAN11, 2025
