= Mela Habijan =

Filipina actress, beauty queen and LGBTQ rights advocate (born 1987)

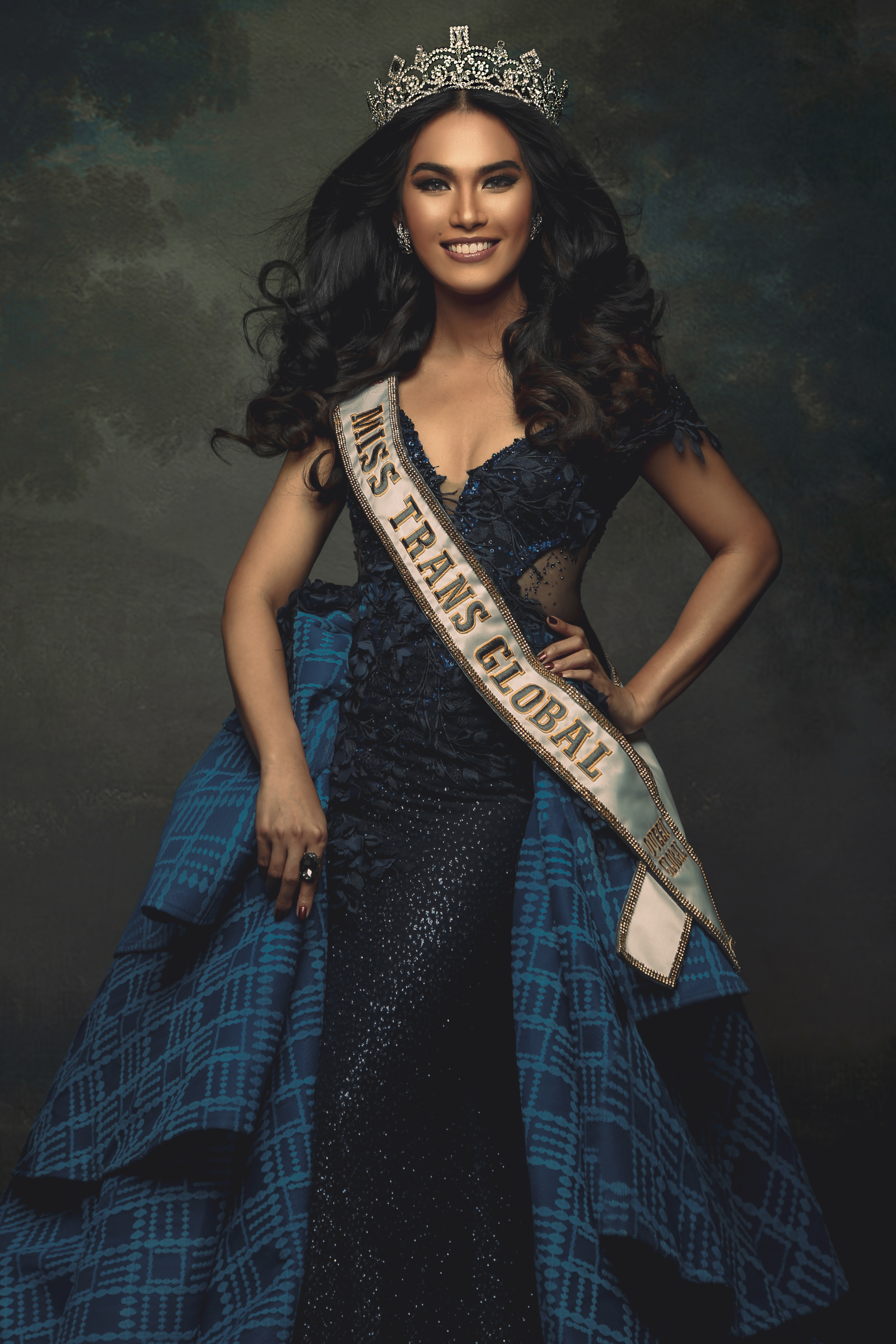
- Miss Trans Global official portrait
- Born: July 11, 1987 (age 39)
- Occupations: Actress; writer; LGBTQ rights activist
- Beauty pageant titleholder
- Title: 2020 Miss Trans Global
- Hair color: Black
- Eye color: Brown

Mela Franco Habijan is a Filipina actress, beauty queen, and LGBTQ rights advocate who is known for being the winner of the inaugural Miss Trans Global in 2020.

== Early life ==
Mela Franco Habijan was born to Erico and Irene Habijan on July 11, 1987. Mela was raised as a boy and was perceived as the couple's first-born son in her childhood and early adulthood. Mela first came out as gay in 2002, receiving acceptance from her father who is an educator and a Catholic leader. She later came out as a trans woman in 2017.

== Pageantry and modelling ==
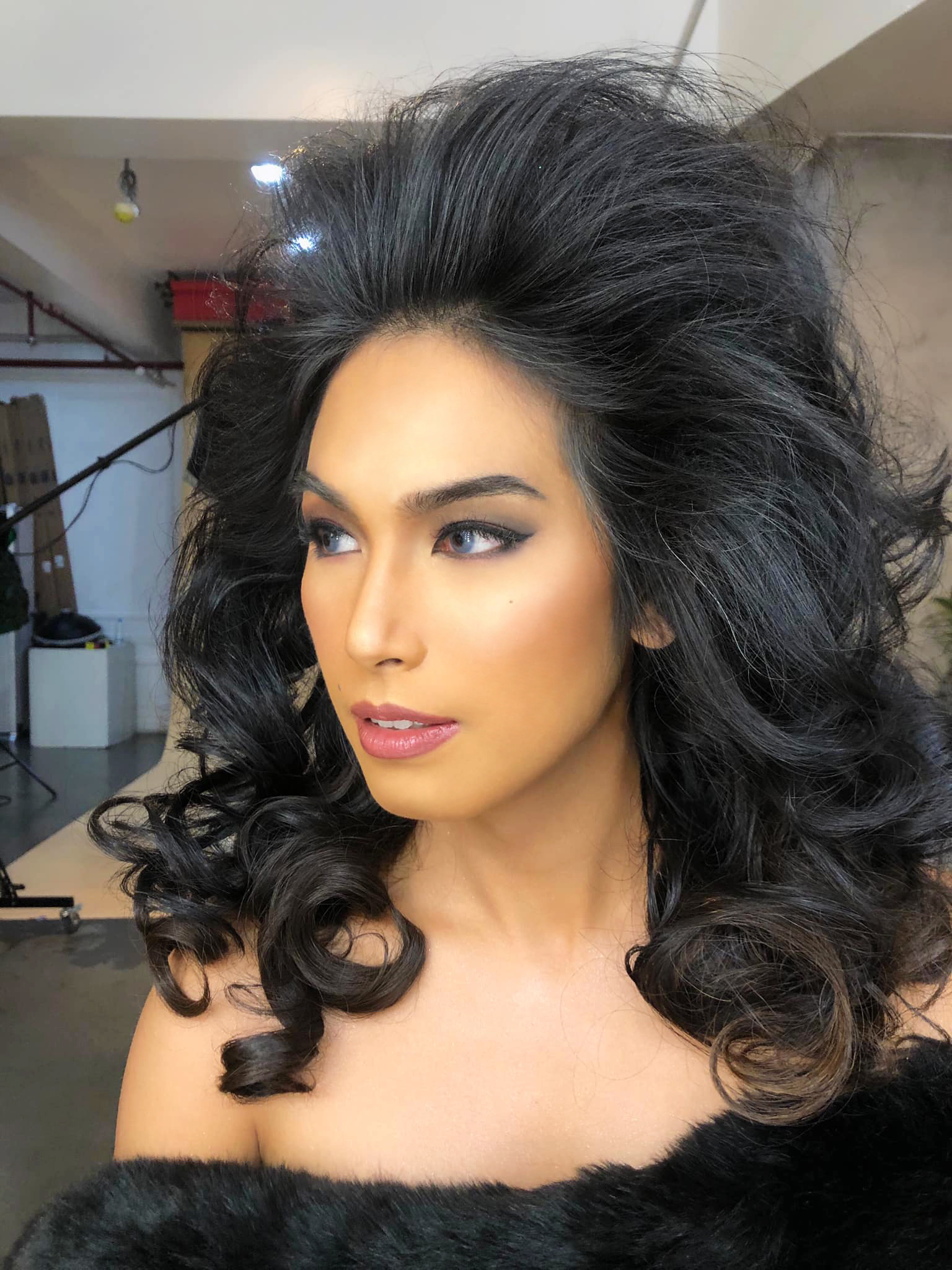
Habijan at the Miss Trans Global photoshoot in December 2020.

Mela Habijan was crowned the inaugural Miss Trans Global in a ceremony held on September 12, 2020 virtually due to the COVID-19 pandemic. She was later featured in the January 2021 issue of the London publication Trans Beauty Magazine as the winner of the pageant.

In 2023, Habijan joined the Coco Rocha Model Camp and got mentored by Coco Rocha herself.

== Television ==
Habijan is an actress. Prior to entering Miss Trans Global, she has appeared in television shows of GMA Network such as Magpakailanman and Asawa Ko, Karibal Ko as Analyn Barro's rival and ABS-CBN's Manilennials.

She has been also a Guest Drag Enforcer in the reality show Drag Den.

Habijan as "Mother Sparker" hosted the gay dating show Sparks Camp for three seasons from 2023 to 2025.

== Activism ==
Habijan being a trans woman herself is an advocate for transgender rights. She has supported SOGIE Bill. She also believed that the word bakla, sometimes used as a pejorative, should be reclaimed by the LGBTQ community.

As a writer, Habijan has cautioned against sensationalizing coming out stories believing it should be framed as empowerment and that there should be balance.

In 2022, Habijan organized a photoshoot for four trans women who were initially not allowed to participate in their graduating ceremonies without cutting their long hair. The four women were eventually allowed by the school administration.

== Personal life ==
Habijan lived as a gay who presented feminine prior to coming out as a transgender woman when she was still a writer at ABS-CBN. Her discernment started around 2014 when she joined a corporate beauty pageant. Habijan moved out of her parents' residence in September 2017 after coming out as a transgender woman. She however attested that her parents accepted her gender identity in a social media post a year later.

Habijan holds a Bachelor of Arts in Communication from Ateneo de Manila University, and an MBA from IE Business School.

Habijan professed to be a survivor of rheumatic heart disease.
