= Sarocha Akaros =

Thai model, Miss Trans Global 2023(born 1997)

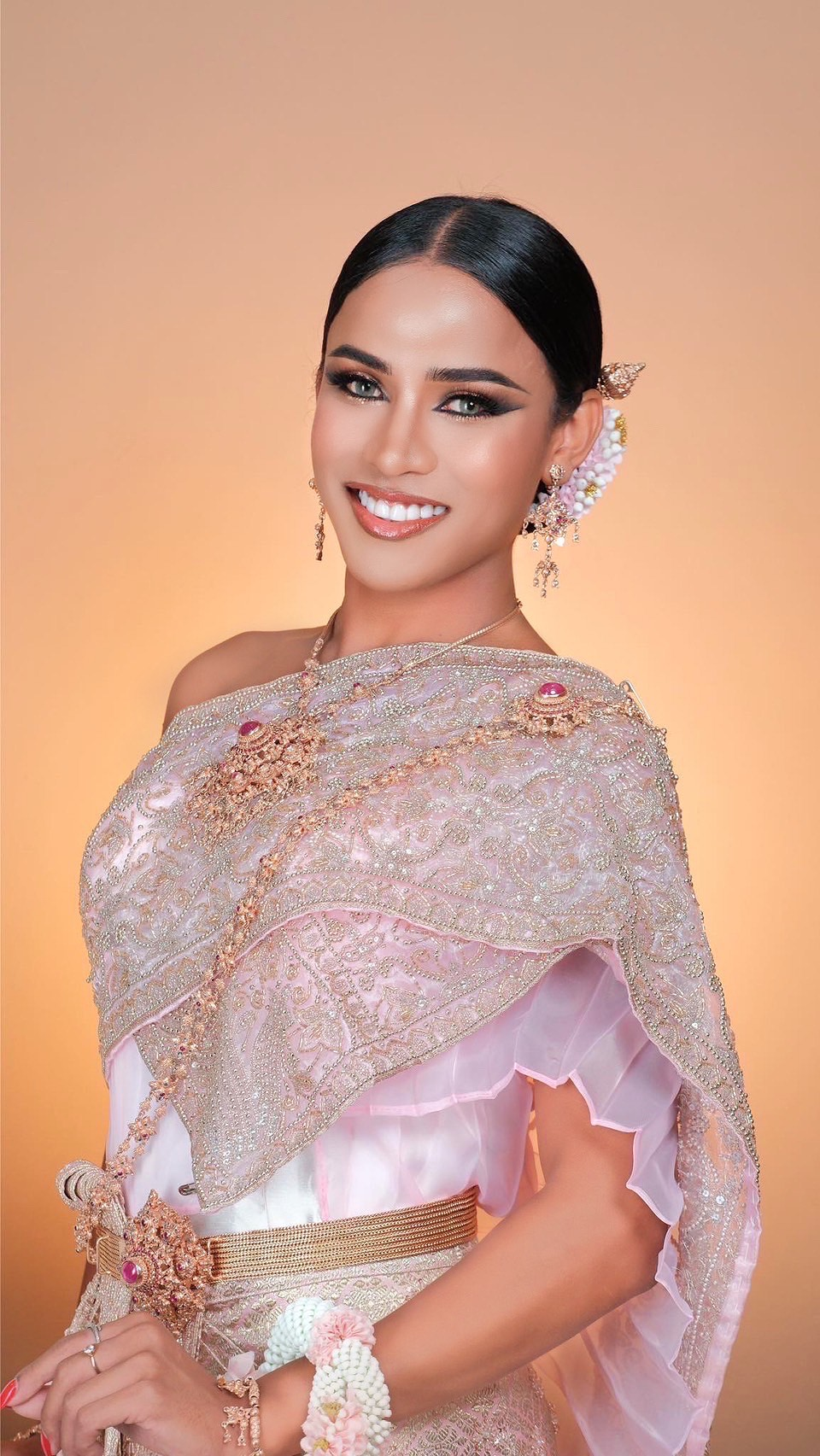
- Born: December 2, 1997 (age 28); Hat Yai, Thailand
- Other name: Piano Sarocha Akaros
- Education: Walailak University
- Occupations: Model; Technologist
- Known for: Miss Trans Global 2023
- Beauty pageant titleholder
- Years active: 2016–present
- Major competitions: Miss LGBT Thailand 2020; Miss Mimosa Queen Thailand 2020; Miss Trans Global 2023

Sarocha Akaros (Thai: เสกสรรค์ อาการส; born 2 December 1997), nicknamed Piano is a Thai model and the winner Miss Trans Global in 2023. She also received the pageant's Eloquent Queen of the Year award.

== Life and career ==
Sarocha Akaros was born on December 2, 1997, in Hat Yai. She was assigned male at birth. Her dad was a Thai boxer, which disapproved of her transgender identity.

She started her career in Surat Thani where she honed her childhood skills in Thai boxing and Manohra folktale dancing. along with her childhood Muay Thai training, became the tools that funded her education. She graduated with a Bachelor of Science in Medical Technology at Walailak University. In the honour of her late friend which received AIDS, she pledged to use her training to save lives.

In 2020, Akaros participated in Miss LGBTQ Thailand and won. In the same year, she competed in Miss Mimosa Queen Thailand 2020 and was named second runner-up. In July 2021, the organization revoked her title before the end of her term, citing social media posts that it is considered inconsistent with the pageant's standards for titleholders. The decision attracted attention because it followed her public criticism of the Thai government's handling of political and social issues.

In 2023, Akaros represented Thailand at the fourth edition of Miss Trans Global, which held in London. She was crowned Miss Trans Global 2023, becoming the first Thai contestant to win the international title.

== Personal life ==
Before gaining recognition in pageantry, she worked as a medical technologist. During the COVID-19 pandemic, she participated in healthcare and laboratory-related volunteer work, providing support to communities.
