= Sruthy Sithara =

Indian model, Miss Trans Global 2021

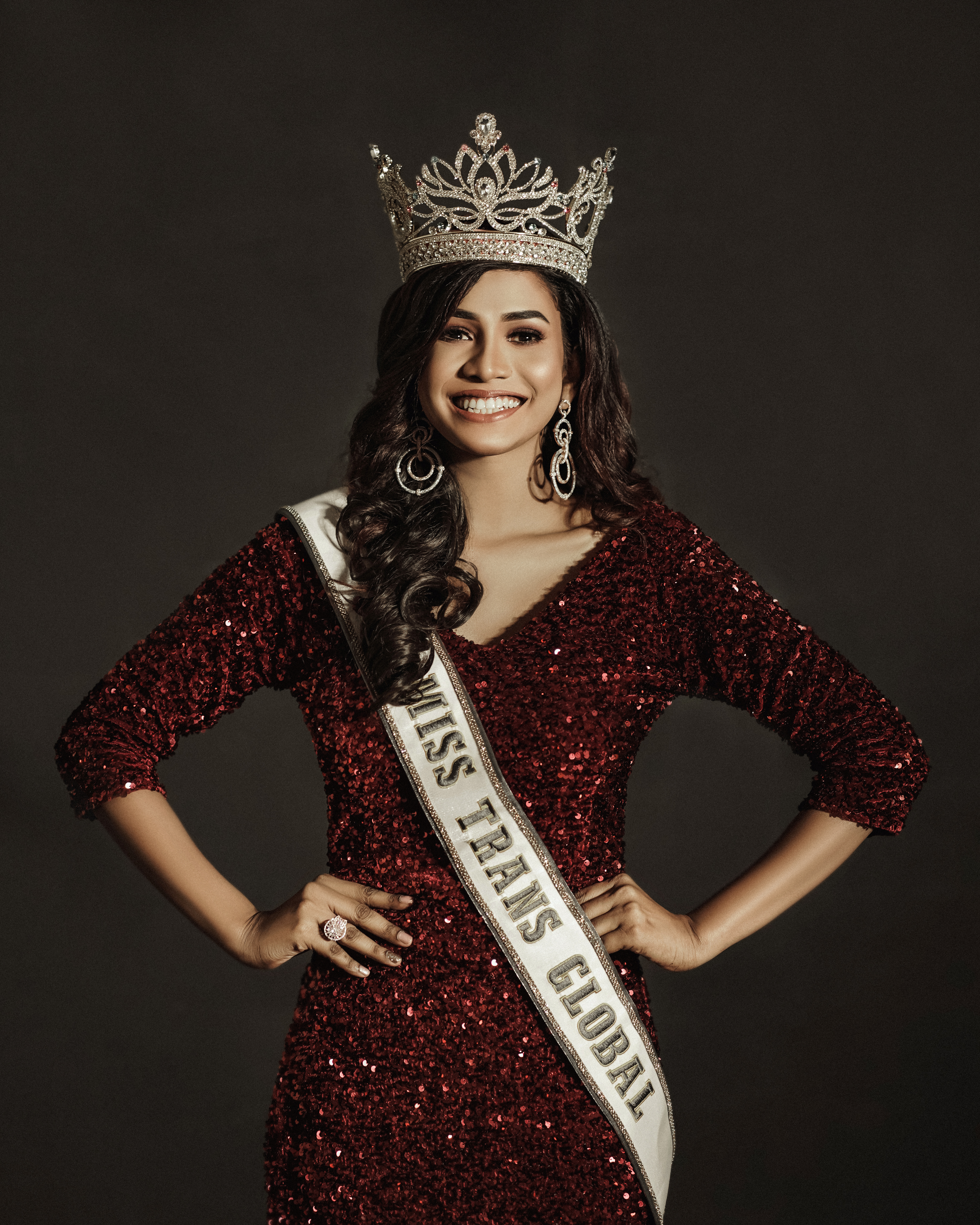
- Born: 1992 or 1993 (age 33–34); Vaikom, Kerala, India
- Occupations: Model; Actress LGBTQ+ rights activist
- Beauty pageant titleholder
- Title: Miss Trans Global 2021; Most Eloquent Queen of the Year 2021
- Years active: 2018–present
- Hair color: Black
- Eye color: Brown

Sruthy Sithara (Malayalam: ശ്രുതി സിത്താര; born c. 1992) is an Indian model and actress who won Miss Trans Global 2021. Born in Vaikom, Kerala, Sithara experienced gender dysphoria growing up, but embraced her transgender identity and came out after college. Sithara was one of four transgender people in the employment of the Government of Kerala, working in their Social Justice Department.

Sithara began modeling in 2018. In 2021, Sithara was crowned Miss Trans Global 2021 after representing India. She was the first Indian transgender woman to win an international beauty pageant. She has been involved in LGBT+ rights advocacy.

== Early life ==
Sruthy Sithara was born c. 1992 in her hometown of Vaikom, Kerala. Studying at a residential school in Kottayam, Sithara was unaware of the transgender community until Class XII and experienced gender dysphoria and transphobia whilst growing up.

Sithara attended college in the city of Kochi, Kerala, where she first learned of the transgender community. She began to work a corporate job in the city. Gradually, she began coming out as transgender. Two of her friends helped her come out to her family successfully. She was also met with acceptance by her friends and colleagues, although she recounted undergoing rejection and difficulty through the process in an interview with the Deccan Chronicle in 2018.

== Career ==
In 2018, at the age of twenty-five, Sithara worked as a project assistant in the transgender wing of the Government of Kerala's Social Justice Department and was one of the first four transgender people in their employment; she was the first in her position. She once worked with K. K. Shailaja, the lauded former health minister of Kerala. Sithara told the Deccan Chronicle in 2018 of her aim to become the country's first transgender Indian Administrative Service (IAS) officer. Sithara started modeling in 2018, acting in local advertisements and albums. She won Queen of Dhwayah 2018, the second edition of Kerala's first beauty pageant for transgender women.

=== Miss Trans Global 2021 ===
Sithara represented India in Miss Trans Global 2021, an international beauty pageant for transgender women which began in 2020. Sithara spent six months preparing for the pageant, guided by actor Namitha Marimuthu and make-up artist Renju Renjimar, and spent six months competing. Although Miss Trans Global 2021 was to be hosted in London, COVID-19 restrictions rendered the pageant an online event.

On 1 December, Sithara was crowned both the winner and the Most Eloquent Queen of The Year 2021. On Instagram, she dedicated her crown to both her late mother and her late friend Anannyah Kumari Alex, a radio and news anchor who was the first transgender candidate for legislative assembly elections in Kerala. Alex died by suicide in July 2021 after suffering ongoing pain and genital mutilation from a botched gender confirmation surgery. Sithara was congratulated on Twitter by R. Bindu, the Minister for Higher Education and Social Justice of Kerala.

=== Advocacy ===
Sithara was described by The Hindu as an LGBTQ+ rights activist and has received recognition as such after the contest. Miss Sahhara, the founder of Miss Trans Global, praised her for her advocacy. She founded an online LGBTQ+ advocacy campaign named Kaleidoscope. As part of the campaign, she has attended sessions both online and in colleges throughout Kerala. She has also founded the Rise Up Forum, which focuses more broadly on societal and environmental issues. She inaugurated a wall art program and four murals painted on the walls of Fort Kochi for the Rise Up Forum in 2022.

=== Acting ===
In a 2021 interview with The New Indian Express, Sithara expressed her desire to pursue a career in acting and for transgender representation in Malayalam cinema to improve. She made her acting debut in the lead role in Pink (TBA), a Malayalam-language romantic film written and directed by Vinu Vijay. Sithara plays the CEO of a dating app. The film chronicles her transgender character's relationships, first with a man, a woman and then a transgender person.

== Personal life ==
Sithara lives in Vaikom, Kerala, in southern India. She is currently in a relationship with theatre artist Daya Gayathri after Gayathri supported her through a major breakup. They are the first lesbian-transgender couple in Kerala and India to come out publicly. The couple has gained a following on the social media platform TikTok, and confronted online criticism. Gayathri also performed in Pink alongside Sithara.

== Selected works ==
- Soman, Deepa; Sithara, Sruthy (14 September 2018). "Sruthy Sithara: If one's family accepts you, the society will have to follow suit". The Times of India. ISSN 0971-8257.
