= Miss Trans Albania =

Transgender beauty pageant in Albania

Miss Trans Albania is a beauty pageant for transgender people organized annually in Albania. It was first held in 2014 in Tirana.

The first edition was held in 2014, organized by the LGBT Alliance and other NGO's dealing with LGBTI+ issues in Albania. The organizers are aiming to bring more visibility to the marginalized community of transgender people in Albania, who rarely go out in public for their rights due to social stigma, and to promote LGBT rights.

Albanians' views on LGBT rights are generally conservative. In 2017, apart from local media, some international outlets covered the event. The contestants and organizers considered the event as "the best proof" that a transgender community exists in Albania and as a step towards a wider recognition of the rights of transgender people by the Albanian population and institutions.

The 5th edition of the beauty pageant competition was filled with messages aimed at lobbying for a more acceptable society for the trans rights as the institutional support remains very low and the legislation has not advanced at all when it comes to the trans rights since 2014.

== See also ==
- Miss Trans Star Internacional
- Miss T World
- LGBT rights in Albania
