= Miss Trans Israel =

Beauty pageant for transgender women celebrated in Israel

Miss Trans Israel is a beauty pageant for transgender people. It was first held in 2016 in Tel Aviv, when it was won by Talleen Abu Hanna. She represented the nation of Israel in the Miss Trans Star International beauty pageant, that was held in the city of Barcelona in 2016.

== Miss Trans Israel 2016 ==
Miss Trans Israel Pageant was held on May 27, 2016, at Habima National Theater in Tel Aviv, Israel. Eleven contestants from a variety of religious and ethnic backgrounds competed for the title of the first ever Miss Trans Israel 2016.

=== Auditions ===
On March 3, 2016, three rounds of auditions were held at the Theater Club in Jaffa for the 35 trans women who wished to compete. Out of the nineteen participants who came to the auditions, eleven finalists were selected to compete in the final beauty pageant.

=== Pageant ===
To mark the beginning of pride week in Tel aviv, organizers and activists at the LGBT center produced for the first time in history, the Miss Trans Israel pageant held at Habima National Theatre. The prize was $15,000 worth of plastic surgery procedures at the Kamol Cosmetic Hospital in Bangkok, Thailand, including airfare and hotel accommodation, and donated by Dr. Kamol and Kamol hospital team. The event received international attention, with articles and videos in online newspapers such as CBS, NBC, The New York Times, Boston Herald, Business Insider, Time magazine, Jerusalem Post, Haaretz, The Times of India, and Spanish El Mundo. Contestants were asked to model a swimwear look, a casual dress, and a bridal gown, in addition to being asked questions about their fashion style.

=== Production team ===
- Executive Director: Israela Stephanie Lev
- Producer: Shenhav Levy
- Director of LGBT Center: Yuval Egart
- Public Relations: Hanita Lev Ari
- Show Director: Segev Gershon
- Visual Media: Koby Ben Shoshan
- Lighting: Noa Elran
- Photographer: Eitan Tal
- Artistic Review: Ilan Peled , Noya Aviv, and Sharon Haziz
- Music: Yoav Arnon
- Graphic Designer: Guy Kaminer
- Styling: Gili Algabi
- Costumes: Julie Vino
- Make Up: Miki Buganim Academy
- Hair: Davis and Udi Academy
- Hosts: Gal Uchovsky and Sharon Haziz
- Choreographer: Shay Susanna

=== Panel of judges ===
- Efrat Tilma
- Betty Rockaway
- Shenhav Levy
- Nicol Raidman
- Vanessa Lopez Miss Star International 2015
- Ronan Ackerman

=== Guests of honor ===
- Judy Shalom Nir-Mozes
- Gadi Bar Lavi
- Jesper Vahr, Denmark ambassador to Israel
- Gila Goldstein

=== Contestants ===
In a press release issued by the organizers and producers of the pageant, contestants were described as constituting "a true Israeli mosaic. With different backgrounds, communities, and faiths, they are an example of courage and tolerance." Contestants came from all over Israel, they represented Muslim, Jewish, Christian, Bedouin, and Druze faiths, as well as Israeli, Arab, and Russian-Israeli ethnicities. The eleven contestants were:

- Talleen Abu Hanna
- Elian Nasiel
- Reem Or
- Aylin Ben Zaken
- Angelina Shamilov
- Danielle Larnon
- Maya Smadja
- Almog Yehuda
- Carolin Khoury
- Madlen Matar
- Shontal Israel

=== Winner ===
Talleen Abu Hanna was crowned the winner of the pageant, breaking historical boundaries and becoming the first ever Miss Trans Israel. Abu Hanna is a ballet dancer, and a model, and now lives in Tel Aviv. After her victory at Miss Trans Israel, Abu Hanna went on to win second place in the Miss Star International Beauty Pageant 2016 which was held in Barcelona on September 17. She also appeared in the eighth season of the Israeli edition of Big Brother.

=== Celebration of the Trans Community ===
For organizers, activists, contestants, and the LGBT community, the pageant was a celebration of acceptance in a region fraught with conflict and violence. Israel is arguably the only country in the Middle East where Trans people are free to live and express their true identities. Director, Israela Stephanie Lev was quoted in the Jerusalem Post saying: "We live in Israel, the only sane country in the region where people can live as gays or transgenders and no one is going to throw them off the rooftop or slaughter them.

== Miss Trans Israel 2017 ==
Elian Nesiel from Bat Yam is the winner of the beauty pageant Miss Trans Israel 2017, and she represented the nation of Israel in the Miss Trans Star International 2017 beauty contest, that was held in the city of Barcelona.

== See also ==
- Miss Star International
- Miss T World
- LGBT in the Middle East
- LGBT rights in Israel
- Tel Aviv Municipal LGBT Community Center
- Habima Theatre
