= Miss T World =

Beauty pageant for transgender women

- Formation: 2017
- Headquarters: Desenzano del Garda, Province of Brescia, Lombardy, Italy

Miss T World is a beauty pageant for transgender women. The First event took place on 23 September 2017, in the Alberti Theater, in the village of Desenzano del Garda, near the city of Brescia, in the region of Lombardy, in Italy.

The winner from 16 contestants was Paula Bitushchini, representing the Philippines, in second place was Sandy Lopes, representing Thailand. Alessia Cavalcanti represented Italy. Also present were Miss International Queen 2013 Marcela Ohio, Melissa Gurgel, Miss Brasil 2014 and Miss International Queen 2015 Trixie Maristela, and Miss Trans Star International 2016 Rafaela Manfrini.

The 2022 contest on 24 September, at Centre Lucia Theater, in Brescia Italy, was won by Valunpath (Venus) Loysanun, representing Thailand. Second place was Dominique representing Brazil. The 2021 winner was Victoria Fernandes from Brazil, second place was Luiza. The 2022 winner was Rebecca Valenttina Mathias representing Brazil, and second place was Aëla Chanel from France.

== Titleholders ==
Year	Country	Titleholder	National Title	Venue	Entrants
2026	Thailand	Harper Ambrosio	Miss Star Thailand	Florence, Italy	10
2025	Brazil	Hellen Nobre	Miss Brasil Trans oficial	Brescia, Italy	13
2024	Ecuador	Reyna Morocho	Miss Star Ecuador	Brescia, Italy	13
2023	Brazil	Dominique Portinari	Miss Brasil Trans	Brescia, Italy	10
2022	Thailand	Valunpath (Venus) Loysanun	Miss T Star Thailand	Magna Graecia, Italy	18
2021	Brazil	Victoria Fernandes	Miss T World Brazil	Magna Graecia, Italy	18
2020	Brazil	Bella Valenttina	Miss T World Brazil	Magna Graecia, Italy	18
2019	Thailand	Sandy Lopes	Miss T World Thailand	Lombardy, Italy	17
2018	Venezuela	Marianna Melo	Miss T World Venezuela	Lombardy, Italy	17
2017	Philippines	Paula Bituschini	Miss T World Philippines	Lombardy, Italy	17

=== By number of wins ===
Country/Territory	Titles	Winner Year
Brazil	4	2020, 2021, 2023, 2025
Thailand	3	2019, 2022, 2026
Ecuador	1	2024
Venezuela	1	2018
Philippines	1	2017

== See also ==
- Miss International Queen
- Miss Continental
- Miss T Star Thailand
- Miss Tiffany's Universe
- Miss Trans Albania
- Miss Trans Israel
- Miss Trans Star International
