= Yolande Zauberman =

French film director and screenwriter

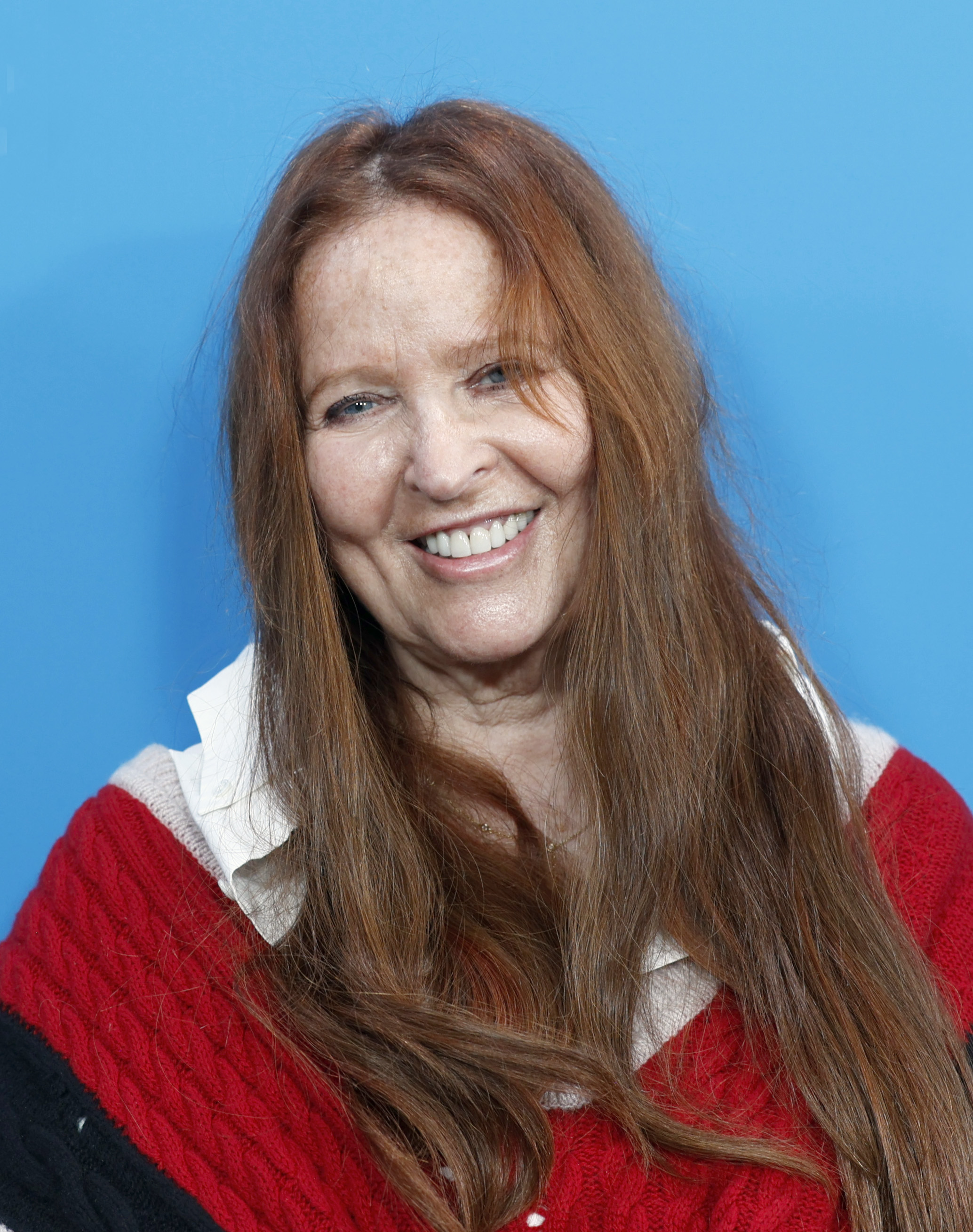
- Zauberman in 2026
- Born: Paris, France
- Occupations: Film director, screenwriter
- Years active: 1990-present

Yolande Zauberman (French pronunciation: [jɔlɑ̃d zobɛʁmɑ̃]) is a French filmmaker, most known for her documentary works about contemporary Jewish life.

== Career ==
Zauberman comes from a Polish Jewish family and used to speak Yiddish with her maternal grandmother. She made her debut in cinema working alongside Amos Gitai. In 1987 she directed her first documentary Classified People, dealing with apartheid in South Africa, which won the Paris Film Festival Grand Prize. Her second documentary, Criminal Caste (1989), was shot in India, and selected at the Cannes Film Festival.

Three years later, she directed her first feature film, Me Ivan, You Abraham, winning the Youth Award at the 1993 Cannes Film Festival, and the Golden St. George at the 18th Moscow International Film Festival. Then followed her two films Clubbed to Death (1996) and The War in Paris (2001) starring Elodie Bouchez, which were both distributed throughout the world.

She also authored the original ideas for the films Tanguy (2001) and Agathe Cléry (2008) for director Etienne Chatillez and conducted a series of photo shoots for SPOON magazine and monthly Le Monde diplomatique. She continued her creative research with CATMASK, a cat mask mounted camera, leading her to work with artists and dancers.

In 2011, her documentary film Would You Have Sex with an Arab?, produced by Yves Chanvillard and Nadim Cheikhrouha (Screenrunner), was selected at the Venice International Film Festival. Shot in Israel, the film is an orchestration of interviews with people who all answer the same questions posed by the author - "Would You Have Sex with an Arab?" and "Would you have sex with an Israeli Jew?".

In 2020, she received the César Award for Best Documentary Film for M.

== Filmography ==
=== Documentaries ===
| Year | English Title | Original Title |
|---|---|---|
| 1988 | Classified People | |
| 1990 | Caste criminelle | |
| 2004 | Paradise Now | Journal d'une femme en crise |
| 2011 | Would You Have Sex with an Arab? | |
| 2018 | M | |
| 2024 | The Belle from Gaza | La Belle de Gaza |

=== Feature films ===
| Year | English Title | Original Title |
|---|---|---|
| 1993 | Me Ivan, You Abraham | Moi Ivan, toi Abraham |
| 1996 | Clubbed to Death | Lola |
| 2002 | The War in Paris | La guerre à Paris |

=== Short films ===
- Les juifs riches (2026)

== See also ==
- List of female film and television directors
