= Prostitution in Israel =

Policy regarding sex trafficking and prostitution has changed dramatically in Israel over the last two decades. In the early 2000s, both non-trafficked prostitution and sex trafficking were widely tolerated in Israel, and the US State Department rated Israel one of the worst countries in the world for human trafficking. In the subsequent decades, Israel began to enforce laws and education against sex trafficking, and banned the purchase of sex - trafficked or not - in 2020, under the Nordic Model.

Prostitution (the exchange of sexual acts for money) was legal in Israel until December 2018, but organised prostitution in the form of brothels and pimping was prohibited. Legislation passed in the Knesset on 31 December 2018 that criminalises the "clients" of prostitutes came into force in May 2020, and was regulated since July 2020 under the Israeli Abolition of Prostitution Consumption Law, where fines will be cast for consumption of prostitution services from an adult. This legislation makes Israel the tenth country to adopt the "Nordic model". The Ministry of Social Affairs and Social Services estimates there to be 14,000 prostitutes in the country.

The main centre of prostitution in Israel is Tel Aviv. It has been estimated that 62% of the brothels and 48% of the massage parlors in the country are in Tel Aviv. The traditional red-light district of the old bus station area was subjected to a number of raids and closures in 2017, and the area is subject to gentrification.

== History ==
Prostitution has existed in Israel since Biblical times, and has been practiced by both women and men. People were advised never to become prostitutes or place their daughters in the trade, as it was viewed as "shameful profession".

In the early 19th century, Jewish Women in Eastern Europe were upended by economic collapse. Many of these women were forced or coerced into prostitution or the sex trade, as it was the only viable means of self-support.

By World War I, prostitution was well established in Tel Aviv, Haifa, Ramla, and most other cities. Brothels were owned by both Jews and Arabs. British soldiers added to the demand for prostitution in the 1930s and 1940s. Tel Aviv was considered to be the centre of the sex trade in the Middle East.

Prostitution was legalized in Israel in 1949 under the Prostitution and Abomination Act, although homosexual prostitution was not legalized till 1954. However, in 1962, indoor prostitution, but not street prostitution, was prohibited, and is controlled by the Israeli Criminal Law 1966, Sections 199–202. However, indoor prostitution has continued to thrive. It was not perceived as a major problem till the 1970s, (Cnaan 1982), and prostitution policy has been described as "benign neglect". A 1975 inquiry (Ben-Eato) recommended legalization, but this was not implemented. (Cnaan 1982)

In the 1990s, as in other countries, trafficking in women became a political issue in women's movements in Israel, who engaged in political lobbying for legislative action. In 2003, Israel passed a law that would allow the state to confiscate the profits of traffickers, but watchdog groups claim it is rarely enforced.

In 2007, a ban on advertising was debated. In December 2009, a bill outlawing the purchase of sex was introduced into the Israeli parliament. In February 2012, another draft bill received cabinet approval.

In 2017, the "Criminal Prohibition of Consumption of Prostitution Services and Community Treatment Bill" was introduced to the Knesset. This proposed law criminalized the purchase of sex, and provides for the "client" to pay the prostitute compensation. A government committee, headed by Justice Ministry director-general, Emmy Palmor, was set up to find the best model for criminalizing "clients". In January 2018, they reported that they had failed to agree on a method, but ultimately recommend "that if using prostitutes is deemed a criminal offense, they favor scaled criminalization". The bill would subject those arrested for prostitution to a fine of up to NIS 1,500 for paying for prostitution services, and NIS 3,000 if the offense is repeated within three years. The accused would be allowed to contest the fine and go to trial if they so choose, but if convicted the fine would be increased up to NIS 75,300.

On 31 December 2018, the proposed bill was passed, criminalizing "sex clients", but not prostitutes. It introduced a fine of NIS 2,000 for offenders, increasing to NIS 4,000 for repeat offenses within three years. A possible criminal case against sex buyers could carry a maximum penalty of NIS 75,300. The Justice Ministry may pursue alternatives to fines, such as "john schools". The law additionally provides NIS 90,000,000 to help those in prostitution switch careers.

Despite the penal code, using the services of a prostitute carries widespread legitimacy in Israel, and social norms distinguish between prostitution and trafficking.

In July 2020, the bill went into effect over the objections of some government offices and welfare groups, who sought a delay to ensure government rehabilitation programs were ready to aid the thousands of newly out-of-work prostitutes. The Public Security Ministry had also sought a delay, citing the police's inability to enforce the new law and the government's failure to set up mandatory seminars for offenders to raise awareness of the dangers of prostitution, which had been proposed on top of the fines. But Justice Minister Avi Nissenkorn denied the request for delay.

== Economics ==
The sex trade in Israel generates up to $500 million in revenue a year.

== Immigration ==
Israel has a large number of non-Jewish Russian, Ukrainian and Central Asian immigrants. Immigrant women have included prostitutes, while others turned to prostitution due to economic hardship in their new land. Prostitution in Israel has been dominated by immigrants from the former Soviet Union since the mass immigration in the 1990s. A study published in 2005 found 1,000 Russian, Ukrainian and Central Asian prostitutes working in Israel, mostly in Tel Aviv and Jerusalem. From 1991 to 1994, the number of "massage parlors" run by Russian, Ukrainian and Central Asian immigrants rose from 14 to 111.

== Politics ==
Various groups have advocated legalizing prostitution, or criminalizing the buyers. Conservative religious political parties have consistently opposed legalization on grounds of immorality. (Cnaan 1982)

Women leaders in the country have also worked to decrease prostitution and sex trafficking in the country with the "Nordic Model", which does not victimize sellers and bans the sale of prostitution. Their bill was set to reach Israel's Ministerial Committee for Legislation near the end of 2018.

The Knesset unanimously passed a law forbidding the buying of sex, as Israel joins other countries that have taken this route in recent years such as Sweden and France.

According to the law, which passed in a 34-0 vote, anyone buying or attempting to buy sex would be fined 2,000 shekels ($534), which doubles for a second offense. For any further violations the offender could be prosecuted and the fine could reach 75,300 shekels.

== Sex trafficking ==
Sex trafficking remains a problem in Israel, although the situation has improved dramatically since the early 2000s, when the country ranked as one of the worst offenders in the world for sex trafficking, and the government essentially tolerated sex trafficking.

According to the findings released in March 2005 by a Parliamentary Inquiry Committee, between 3,000 and 5,000 women had been smuggled into Israel and sold into prostitution in the previous four years. Most of the prostitutes came from Ukraine, Moldova, Uzbekistan, Eritrea and Russia and many were smuggled through Egypt.

In 2007, a report by the Knesset's Committee on the Status of Women reported that in recent years the number of trafficked women had dropped to less than 1,000, though there are still reports that women and other people who are forced into trafficking are brought in through more covert ways. In 2007, the United States State Department placed Israel as a "Tier 2" in its annual Trafficking in Persons reports, meaning that it does not fully comply with the standards for the elimination of trafficking but is making significant efforts to do so. In 2011 the country was upgraded to "Tier 1".

Since 2010, no cases of human trafficking have been reported in Israel and only a limited number of women were brought to the country to be prostitutes.

An organization calling itself the 'Task Force on Human Trafficking' claims that men, in total, visit brothels in Israel up to one million times a month.
