= Miss Star International =

Beauty pageant for transgender women

- Formation: 2010; 16 years ago
- Type: Beauty pageant
- Headquarters: Fort Lauderdale, Florida,
- Location: Spain
- Official language: Spanish, English
- Founder: Thara Wells
- CEO: Arianna Lint
- Executive Director: Jack Neilsen
- Website: transstarinternational.com

Miss Star International is the one of world's biggest beauty pageant for transgender women.

The pageant is owned by Spain-based Thara Wells & Rincon Tranny and run by Florida-based Arianna Lint. It has been held annually starting in 2007 in Barcelona, Catalonia, and most recently in San Juan, Puerto Rico. The mission of the pageant is LGBTQ and Transgender awareness and equality in both society and workforce.

The current titleholder of Miss Star International 2025 is Kloe Rios-Wyatt from Mexico, who was crowned in San Juan, Puerto Rico.

== Titleholders ==
Year	Miss Star International	Runners Up		Venue	Entrants
Year	Miss Star International	First	Second	Venue	Entrants
2025	Khloe Rios-Wyatt; Mexico	Adriana Linares; Puerto Rico	Mulan Nguyen (ASEAN) Southeast Asian	San Juan, Puerto Rico	22
2024	Patricia Payumo; Philippines	Dayanna Mendonza; United States	Makeysha Jamila; Costa Rica	São Paulo, Brazil	22
2023	Veso Golden; Nigeria	Erich Alfaro; Australia	Reyna Morocho; Ecuador	Barcelona, Spain	23
2022	Tiffany Colleman; Nicaragua	Ivanna Díaz; Mexico	Sofía Colmenares; Venezuela	Barcelona, Spain	28
2019	Ava Simões; Angola	Victória Fernandes; Brazil	Walinpan Anuntasilp; Thailand	Barcelona, Spain	25
2018	Kulchaya Tansiri; Thailand	Shantell D´ Marco; Cuba	Maria Rivera; Philippines	Barcelona, Spain	20
2017	Biw Kanitnum; Thailand	Tiana Vasek; Argentina	Elian Nesiel; Israel	Barcelona, Spain	30
2016	Rafaela Manfrini; Brazil	Talleen Abu Hanna; Israel	Kamila Castaneda; Colombia	Barcelona, Spain	28
2015	Vanessa López; Chile	Aleika Sandra; Greece	Atina Lima; Italy	Barcelona, Spain	25
2013	Jade Gómez; Puerto Rico	Amatista de la Spirella; Colombia	Fadiana Alves; Egypt	Barcelona, Spain	15
2012	Lavine Albuquerque; Russia	Bianca Gold; Angola	Ivette Montello; Hawaii	Barcelona, Spain	16
2010	Bruna Geneve; Switzerland	Kalena Rios; Brazil	Victoria Garcia; Spain	Barcelona, Spain	16

=== League Tables ===
==== By number of wins ====
Country/Territory	Titles	Winner Year
Thailand	2	2017, 2018
Mexico	1	2025
Philippines	1	2024
Nigeria	1	2023
Nicaragua	1	2022
Angola	1	2019
Brazil	1	2016
Chile	1	2015
Puerto Rico	1	2013
Russia	1	2012
Switzerland	1	2010

==== Continents by number of wins ====
Continent or region	Titles	Years
Americas	5	2013, 2015, 2016, 2022, 2025
Asia	3	2017, 2018, 2024
Europe	3	2007, 2010, 2012
Africa	2	2019, 2023
Oceania	0	

== See also ==
- Miss International Queen
- Miss T World
