= Katherine Clark =

American politician (born 1963)

- Official portrait, 2023

Member of the U.S. House of Representatives from Massachusetts's 5th district
- Incumbent
- Assumed office December 10, 2013 (Note: Clark's official service began on the date of the special election, while she was not sworn in until December 12, 2013.)
- Preceded by: Ed Markey
House positions
House Majority Leader-designate
Assuming office January 3, 2027
Whip	Pete Aguilar (designate)
Succeeding	Steve Scalise
House Minority Whip
Incumbent
Assumed office January 3, 2023
Leader	Hakeem Jeffries
Preceded by	Steve Scalise
Assistant Speaker of the United States House of Representatives
In office January 3, 2021 – January 3, 2023
Leader	Nancy Pelosi
Preceded by	Ben Ray Luján
Succeeded by	Jim Clyburn (Assistant Democratic Leader)
Vice Chair of the House Democratic Caucus
In office January 3, 2019 – January 3, 2021
Leader	Nancy Pelosi
Preceded by	Linda Sánchez
Succeeded by	Pete Aguilar

Member of the Massachusetts Senate
- In office January 5, 2011 – December 10, 2013
- Preceded by: Richard Tisei
- Succeeded by: Jason Lewis
- Constituency: Middlesex and Essex district (2011–2013); 5th Middlesex district (2013)

Member of the Massachusetts House of Representatives from the 32nd Middlesex district
- In office March 13, 2008 – January 5, 2011
- Preceded by: Mike Festa
- Succeeded by: Paul Brodeur

Personal details
- Born: Katherine Marlea Clark; July 17, 1963 (age 63) New Haven, Connecticut, U.S.
- Party: Democratic
- Spouse: Rodney Dowell (m. 1992)
- Children: 3
- Education: St. Lawrence University (BA); Cornell University (JD); Harvard University (MPA)
- Website: House website Campaign website
- Clark's voice Clark introducing the Every Prescription Conveyed Securely (EPCS) Act. Recorded June 22, 2018

Katherine Marlea Clark (born July 17, 1963) is an American lawyer and politician who has served as House minority whip since 2023 and is in her seventh term as the U.S. representative for Massachusetts's 5th congressional district, having held the post since 2013. She previously served as assistant speaker (Note: Officially the "House assistant Democratic leader") from 2021 to 2023 and vice chair of the House Democratic Caucus from 2019 to 2021. Clark was a member of the Massachusetts House of Representatives from 2008 to 2011 and the Massachusetts Senate from 2011 to 2013.

Born in Connecticut, Clark worked as an attorney in several states before moving to Massachusetts in 1995, where she worked in state government. She joined the Melrose School Committee in 2002, becoming committee chair in 2005. She was first elected to the state legislature in 2008, and contributed to legislation regarding criminal justice, education, and municipal pensions. She won the 2013 special election for the U.S. House of Representatives to succeed Ed Markey in the 5th district, and sits on the House Appropriations Committee. Clark's district includes many of Boston's northern and western satellite cities and suburbs, such as Medford, Framingham, Woburn, Waltham, and her home city of Revere.

Clark joined the leadership for the first time in 2019 as Vice Chair of the House Democratic Caucus, she became Assistant Speaker of the House in 2021, House Minority Whip in 2023 and set to serve as Majority Leader in the 120th Congress.

== Early life and career ==
Katherine Marlea Clark was born on July 17, 1963, in New Haven, Connecticut. She attended St. Lawrence University, Cornell Law School, and Harvard's John F. Kennedy School of Government. She studied in Nagoya, Japan, in 1983.

In her early career, she worked as an attorney in Chicago. She then moved to Colorado, where she worked as a clerk for Judge Alfred A. Arraj of the United States District Court for the District of Colorado and later as a staff attorney for the Colorado District Attorneys' Council. She moved to Massachusetts in 1995 and became general counsel for the state Office of Child Care Services.

== Local politics ==
In 2001, Clark moved to Melrose, where she was elected to the Melrose School Committee, taking her seat in January 2002. She first ran for the Massachusetts Senate in 2004 and lost to Republican incumbent Richard Tisei. In January 2005, she was unanimously elected chairwoman of the Melrose School Committee. In 2006, she ran for the 32nd Middlesex seat in the Massachusetts House of Representatives when incumbent Mike Festa began a run for Middlesex district attorney but withdrew after he dropped out of the race.

Clark was appointed co-chair of Victory 2006, the state Democratic Party's campaign and fundraising effort for the 2006 gubernatorial election. She spent some time as chief of policy and government relations in the Massachusetts Attorney General's office.

== Massachusetts legislature ==
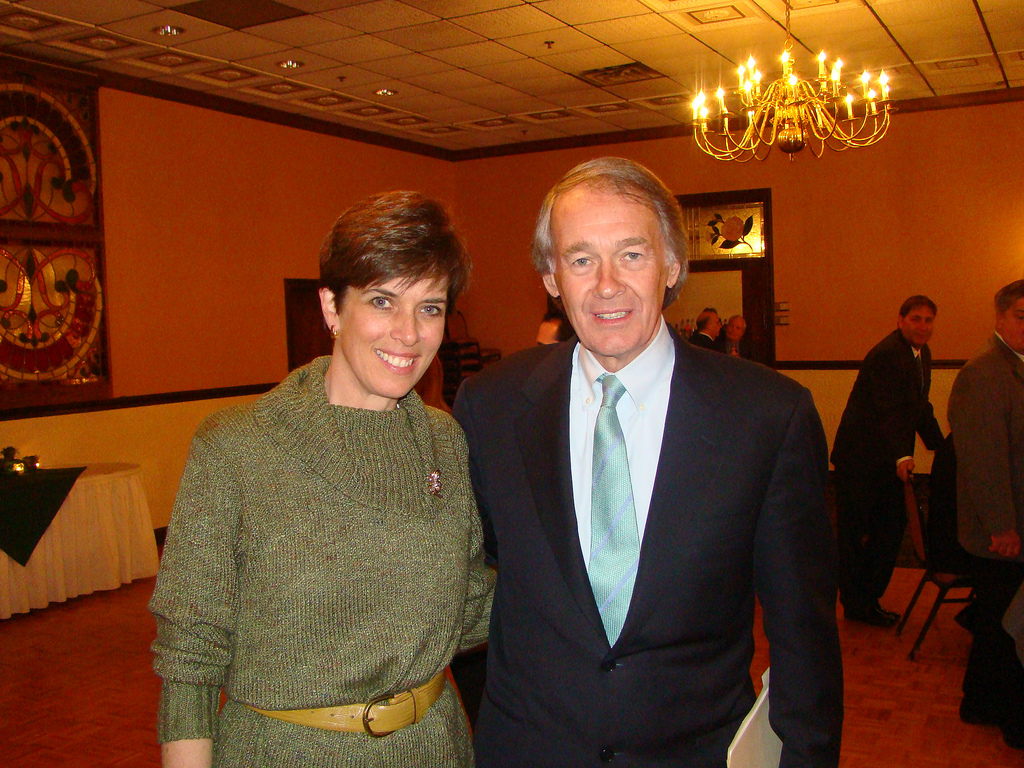
At an event with then-U.S. Representative Ed Markey in 2008

=== Massachusetts House of Representatives (2008–2011) ===
Festa resigned his state House seat in October 2007 to become secretary of elder affairs in the Deval Patrick administration, and Clark entered the special election to succeed him. During the campaign, she emphasized her experience as an attorney and made "developing stability in state aid" her top policy issue. She won the Democratic primary in January with 65% of the vote, defeating two other Melrose Democrats. She defeated Republican real estate businessman Mark B. Hutchison, 63% to 37%. In November 2008, she was reelected to a full term unopposed.

Sworn in on March 13, 2008, Clark represented Melrose and Wakefield. She served on both the education, judiciary, and municipalities and the regional government committees.

=== Massachusetts Senate (2011–2013) ===
When Tisei resigned from the state senate to run for lieutenant governor of Massachusetts, Clark ran for his seat. In the Democratic primary, she defeated Stoneham attorney Michael S. Day, 64%–36%. In the November 2010 general election, she defeated Republican Craig Spadafora, 52%–48%.

Clark was sworn in on January 5, 2011. She supports abortion rights and has been endorsed in her campaigns by NARAL Pro-Choice Massachusetts and the Planned Parenthood Advocacy Fund.

In 2011, Clark was co-chair of the Joint Committee on Public Service, where she was lead author of the Senate version of a bill to reform municipal pensions. For her work in 2011, she received legislator of the year awards from the Massachusetts Municipal Association and the Massachusetts Police Association. In 2012, she authored a law that takes steps to ensure that all Massachusetts students read at grade level by third grade. Also in 2012, her bill extending restraining orders in domestic violence cases to cover victims' pets, which are often used as pawns in abusive relationships, was signed as part of a larger law on animal shelters. In 2013, she co-sponsored a bill expanding the state's wiretapping authority, which was strictly limited under existing law, in order to help police better investigate violent street crime. At the same time, she co-sponsored a bill to secure electronic privacy protections, requiring police to have probable cause before investigating the electronic records of individuals. She filed another bill tightening sex offender laws, imposing stricter penalties and making offender data more accessible to agencies and the public. The Women's Bar Association of Massachusetts named Clark its 2013 Legislator of the Year for her service on women's issues.

Clark's committee assignments in the state Senate were as follows:

- Judiciary (Chair)
- Mental Health and Substance Abuse (Vice Chair)
- Post Audit and Oversight (Vice Chair)
- Public Health
- Public Safety and Homeland Security
- Steering and Policy (Chair)

== U.S. House of Representatives (2013–present) ==
=== Elections ===
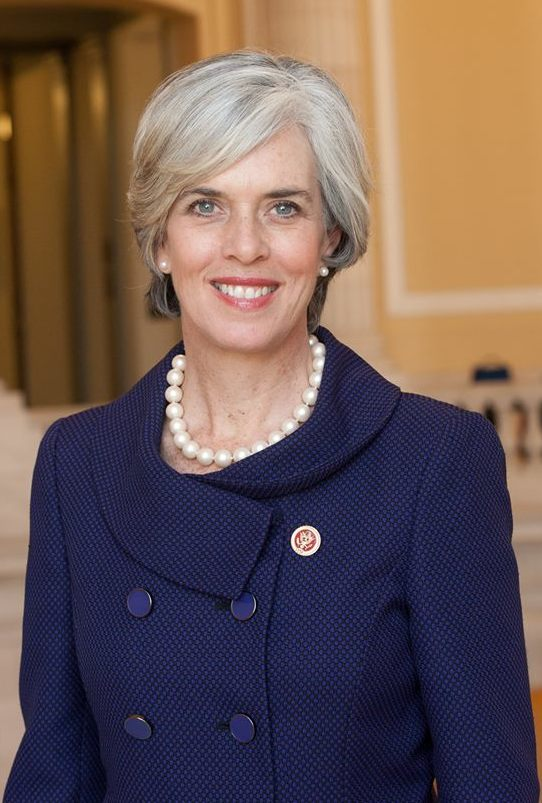
Clark during the 114th Congress

Clark was the Democratic nominee in the 2013 special election for the U.S. House of Representatives in Massachusetts's 5th congressional district. The district's longtime incumbent, Ed Markey, had just been elected to the United States Senate six months into his 19th term. In a heavily contested Democratic primary—the real contest in this heavily Democratic district—she was endorsed by Massachusetts attorney general Martha Coakley and EMILY's List. On October 15, 2013, she won the primary with a plurality of 32% of the vote. Her closest competitor was Middlesex County Sheriff Peter Koutoujian, with 22% of the vote. On December 10, as expected, she easily won the special election.

In 2026, Clark faced primary challengers for the first time in twelve years, with Jonathan Paz and Tarik Samman both running to her left. She won with 74% of the vote and ran unopposed in the general election, thus winning an eighth term in the U.S. House of Representatives.

Clark has served for eight terms in the House, she won every elections with more than 70% of the vote.

=== Tenure ===
Clark was sworn into office on December 12, 2013, and sits on the House Appropriations Committee. In a 2014 interview with The Boston Globe, she compared life in Washington to the television series House of Cards, saying "It's exactly like here, minus the murders."

Clark was unopposed in her bid for a full term in 2014.

In March 2015, Clark decided not to attend the speech by Israeli prime minister Benjamin Netanyahu before a joint session of Congress. She affirmed a commitment to maintaining and strengthening the relationship between the U.S. and Israel but noted that the invitation was offered without first consulting the Obama administration. In 2023, Clark voted to provide Israel with support following the Hamas attack on Israel.

Clark has introduced legislation in response to Internet harassment, most notably resulting from the Gamergate controversy, and has advocated for more stringent enforcement of existing laws. After introducing legislation that would criminalize "swatting" (falsely reporting an ongoing critical incident to dispatch an emergency response), she was herself targeted by a false report of an active shooter at her home.

In January 2017, Clark announced a boycott of Donald Trump's inauguration. She was part of a small group of House and Senate members who chose to boycott the ceremony. Her reason was her desire not to "normalize" Trump's promotion of "bigoted, misogynist, anti-Semitic, and racist claims."

Clark voted with President Joe Biden's stated position 100% of the time, according to FiveThirtyEight analysis completed in January 2023.

During an August 2025 town hall event organized by Friends Committee on National Legislation, Clark referred to Israel's actions in Gaza as a genocide. However, she walked back this statement soon after the event, saying "I want to be clear I am not accusing Israel of genocide."

On November 28, 2018, it was announced that Clark had defeated California congressman Pete Aguilar to succeed Linda Sánchez as vice chair of the House Democratic Caucus.

Clark with Senator Elizabeth Warren in 2019

On November 18, 2020, it was announced that Clark had defeated Rhode Island congressman David Cicilline by a vote of 135 to 92 to succeed Ben Ray Luján as assistant speaker, the number four spot in Democratic house leadership.

=== House Minority Whip ===
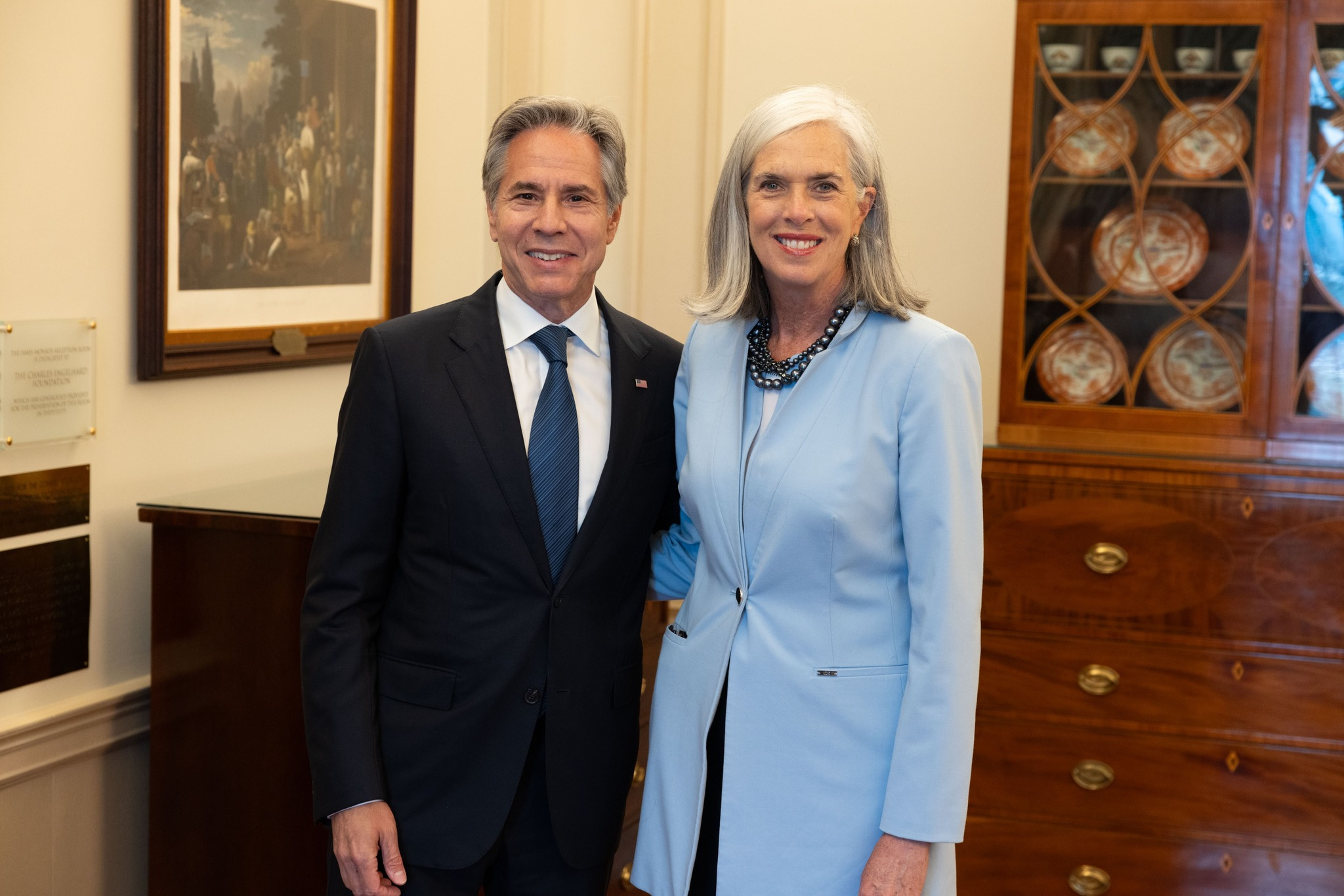
Clark with Secretary of State Antony Blinken in July 2024

In 2021 Clark was mentioned as a possible candidate to succeed Pelosi as Speaker of the House. But after Pelosi, Steny Hoyer, and Jim Clyburn announced their retirement from party leadership in November 2022, Clark instead announced a bid for party whip, the second-highest-ranking individual in the minority party. After running unopposed, Clark was elected as the minority whip on November 30, 2022.

=== House Majority Leader ===
Clark is set to be House Majority Leader after democrats gaining majority in 2026 house elections. She will become the first woman to serve as House Majority Leader.

=== Committee assignments ===
- Committee on Appropriations
  - Subcommittee on Labor, Health and Human Services, Education
  - Subcommittee on Transportation, Housing and Urban Development
  - Subcommittee on the Legislative Branch

=== Caucus memberships ===
- Animal Protection Caucus
- Armenian Caucus
- Autism Caucus
- Baby Caucus
- Bicameral Task Force on Climate Change
- Biomedical Research Caucus
- Bipartisan Congressional Task Force on Alzheimer's Disease
- Career and Technical Education
- Congressional Taiwan Caucus
- Congressional Women's Caucus
- Cranberry Caucus
- Internet Caucus
- Hellenic Caucus
- Heroin Task Force
- Medicare for All Caucus
- Peace Corps Caucus
- Pre-K Caucus
- Prescription Drug Abuse Caucus
- Safe Climate Caucus
- Small Brewers Caucus
- Sustainable Energy & Environment Coalition
- Tom Lantos Human Rights Commission

== Political positions ==
Clark is generally described as a Progressive Democrat.

=== Abortion ===
Clark advocates for federal abortion access and birth control protections. She voted for Women's Health Protection Act, which ensuring access to abortion.

=== ICE ===
Clark doesn't support abolishing ICE, she has advocated for oversight and reforms to the agency.

== Personal life ==
Clark is married to Rodney S. Dowell, executive director for the Massachusetts Board of Bar Overseers, the state entity that regulates the legal profession in Massachusetts. They live in Revere and have three children. In January 2023, Clark confirmed that her adult daughter was arrested for assault by means of a dangerous weapon and damage to property for allegedly graffiti tagging Boston Common's Parkman Bandstand with the words "NO COP CITY" and "ACAB" during a protest.

As of 2021, Clark shares an apartment with representatives Grace Meng, Lois Frankel, and Julia Brownley, and previously Annie Kuster and Cheri Bustos.

== Electoral history ==
Year	Office	Party	Primary			General			Result	Swing	Ref.
Year	Office	Party	Total	%	P.	Total	%	P.	Result	Swing	Ref.
2008	State House	Democratic	6,584	64.62%	1st	3,457	62.66%	1st	Won	Hold	
2008	State House	Democratic	2,823	97.61%	1st	16,569	98.36%	1st	Won	Hold	
2010	State Senate	Democratic	8,475	63.78%	1st	30,492	52.27%	1st	Won	Gain	
2012	State Senate	Democratic	6,247	98.91%	1st	58,256	98.82%	1st	Won	Hold	
2013	U.S. House	Democratic	21,983	31.53%	1st	40,303	65.75%	1st	Won	Hold	
2014	U.S. House	Democratic	57,014	81.19%	1st	182,100	98.29%	1st	Won	Hold	
2016	U.S. House	Democratic	30,066	98.51%	1st	285,606	98.55%	1st	Won	Hold	
2018	U.S. House	Democratic	78,156	99.27%	1st	236,243	75.88%	1st	Won	Hold	
2020	U.S. House	Democratic	162,768	99.43%	1st	294,427	74.32%	1st	Won	Hold	
2022	U.S. House	Democratic	84,845	99.61%	1st	203,994	74.00%	1st	Won	Hold	
2024	U.S. House	Democratic	76,806	99.21%	1st	286,689	98.22%	1st	Won	Hold	
2026	U.S. House	Democratic	85,802	73.62%	1st	233,768	97.78%	1st	Won	Hold	
Source: Secretary of the Commonwealth of Massachusetts | Election Results

== See also ==
- Women in the United States House of Representatives

== Notes ==
U.S. House of Representatives
Preceded by Ed Markey	Member of the U.S. House of Representatives from Massachusetts's 5th congressional district 2013–present	Incumbent
Preceded by Steve Scalise	House Minority Whip; 2023–present	Incumbent
Preceded by Steve Scalise	House Majority Leader; Taking office 2027	Designate
Party political offices
Preceded by Linda Sánchez	Vice Chair of the House Democratic Conference; 2019–2021	Succeeded by Pete Aguilar
Preceded by Ben Ray Luján	Assistant Speaker of the United States House of Representatives; 2021–2023	Succeeded by Jim Clyburn as House Assistant Democratic Leader
U.S. order of precedence (ceremonial)
Preceded by Jason Smith	United States representatives by seniority 121st	Succeeded by Alma Adams
Preceded by Tom Emmer as House Majority Whip	Order of precedence of the United States	Succeeded by Hal Rogers
