= Granara =

Granara is an Italian surname. Notable people with the surname include:

- John Granara (1943–2025), American attorney, member of the Massachusetts House of Representatives and as Special Sheriff of Middlesex County, Massachusetts
- William Granara, American author, translator and scholar of Arabic language and literature

== See also ==
- Granari (disambiguation)
