= John J. McGlynn =

American politician

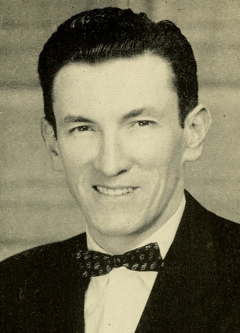
- Portrait of John J. McGlynn

Mayor of Medford, Massachusetts
- In office 1976–1977
- Preceded by: James K. Kurker
- Succeeded by: Eugene F. Grant
- In office 1970–1971
- Preceded by: Patrick J. Skerry
- Succeeded by: Angelo Marotta
- In office 1962–1967
- Preceded by: John C. Carr, Jr.
- Succeeded by: Patrick J. Skerry

Member of the Massachusetts House of Representatives
- In office 1959–1975
- Preceded by: Thomas J. Doherty
- Succeeded by: Frederick Dello Russo

Personal details
- Born: February 26, 1922 Cambridge, Massachusetts
- Died: August 20, 2016 (aged 94) Medford, Massachusetts
- Party: Democratic
- Education: Northeastern University; Suffolk University; Portia Law School
- Occupation: Florist; Realtor; Politician

John James "Jack" McGlynn (February 26, 1922 – August 20, 2016) was an American politician who served as mayor of Medford, Massachusetts, and as a member of the Massachusetts House of Representatives.

== Early life ==
McGlynn was born on February 26, 1922, in Cambridge, Massachusetts, to Anthony and Catherine (McCormack) McGlynn. He graduated from St. Clement High School in 1939. In 1942 he married Helen Lenox.

== Military career ==
During World War II, McGlynn was a member of the 23rd Headquarters Special Troops, a tactical deception unit known as the "Ghost Army" that worked to mislead the Germans about the size and location of American troops. He earned four combat stars during the war.

== Political career ==
McGlynn began his political career in 1954 as a candidate for city council in Medford. He served on city council for a total of 22 years. He was also the city's mayor from 1962 to 1967, 1970 to 1971, and 1976 to 1977. At the time, the position of mayor was a ceremonial one, as an appointed city manager served as the chief administrator of the city. From 1959 to 1975, McGlynn also served as a state representative. In 1966 he was an unsuccessful candidate for lieutenant governor of Massachusetts. During the 1980s, McGlynn was the chief secretary to Governor Edward J. King. From 1983 to 1997 he was the commissioner of the Massachusetts Public Employee Retirement Administration.

== Personal life ==
Outside of politics, McGlynn worked as a realtor and owned a floral shop for several years after the war. For 42 years, McGlynn was also chairman of Medford Cooperative Bank and its successor, Brookline Bank.

His son, Michael J. McGlynn, served as mayor of Medford from 1988 to 2016. The younger McGlynn was the first mayor elected under the strong mayor form of government.

Medford's John J. McGlynn Sr. Elementary School is named after McGlynn.

== Death ==
McGlynn died on August 20, 2016, at his home in Medford. On August 25 and 26 he lay in repose at Medford City Hall. McGlynn was the first person in modern history to receive this honor.
