= Dipaola =

Dipaola may refer to:

- 27130 Dipaola, main-belt asteroid
- James DiPaola (1953–2010), American police officer and politician
