= A. Joseph DeNucci =

American politician and boxer

Denucci c. 1983
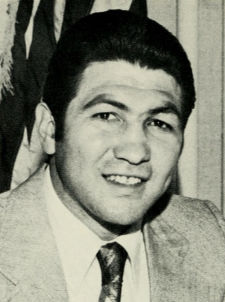
- DeNucci c. 1983

21st Massachusetts State Auditor
- In office 1987–2011
- Preceded by: John J. Finnegan
- Succeeded by: Suzanne Bump

Member of the Massachusetts House of Representatives
- In office 1977–1986
- Preceded by: Ed Markey
- Succeeded by: Anthony Mandile
- Constituency: 16th Middlesex (1977–79); 10th Middlesex (1979–86)

Personal details
- Born: August 30, 1939 Newton, Massachusetts
- Died: September 8, 2017 (aged 78)
- Party: Democratic
- Education: Boston University

A. Joseph DeNucci (August 30, 1939 – September 8, 2017) was an American boxer and Democratic Party politician who served as the Massachusetts state auditor for six terms from 1987 to 2011.

== Early life and career ==
DeNucci started working at 10 in a bowling alley, picking up and racking pins. DeNucci started boxing at 16, winning the New England Golden Gloves Championship.

As a professional boxer in the 1950s through 1970s, DeNucci compiled a record of 54 wins (with 27 knockouts), 15 losses, and 4 draws. He lost two middleweight fights, both by split decision, to Emile Griffith. DeNucci holds the record for the most fights, 23, in the Boston Garden.

== Political career ==
DeNucci served in the Massachusetts House of Representatives for ten years, where he was chairman of the Human Services Committee. DeNucci then served as the Massachusetts State Auditor from 1987 to 2011. DeNucci was the longest-serving auditor in Massachusetts history. He decided not to seek re-election in 2010.

== Personal life ==
DeNucci had five children and fourteen grandchildren, and was married to Barbara DeNucci. He was a member of the National Italian American Sports Hall of Fame.

DeNucci died on September 8, 2017, from complications related to Alzheimer's disease. Postmortem analysis of DeNucci's brain confirmed that he experienced chronic traumatic encephalopathy (CTE).

Party political offices
Preceded by John J. Finnegan	Democratic nominee for Auditor of Massachusetts; 1986, 1990, 1994, 1998, 2002, 2006	Succeeded by Suzanne Bump
Massachusetts House of Representatives
Preceded by Ed Markey	Member of the Massachusetts House of Representatives from the 16th Middlesex district 1977–1979	Succeeded by Bruce N. Freeman
Preceded by Eleanor Campobasso	Member of the Massachusetts House of Representatives from the 10th Middlesex district 1979–1986	Succeeded by Anthony Mandile
Political offices
Preceded by John J. Finnegan	Auditor of Massachusetts; 1987–2011	Succeeded by Suzanne Bump
