= Porreca =

Porreca is a surname. Notable people with the surname include:

- Giorgio Porreca (1927–1988), Italian chess player
- Marilyn Porreca (1932–2008), American politician
- Cameron Porreca ,

American Businessman
