= Buzzell =

Buzzell is a surname. Notable people with the surname include:

- Colby Buzzell (born 1976), American writer and blogger
- Edward Buzzell (1895–1985), American film director
- Fannie M. Buzzell, American politician
- Hodgdon C. Buzzell (1878–1948), American lawyer and mayor
- John Buzzell (1766–1863), Free Will Baptist
- John R. Buzzell, leader of 1834 Ursuline Convent riots
- Loring Buzzell (1927–1959), American music publisher; nephew of Edward Buzzell and president of Hecht-Lancaster & Buzzell Music
- Reginald W. Buzzell (1894–1959), American brigadier general

== See also ==
- John H. Bunzel, author
