= Granari =

Granari may refer to:

- Grânari, a village in Jibert Commune, Brașov County, Romania
- Granari, human settlement in Montopoli di Sabina, Italy

== See also ==
- Granara
- Granaria
