= Samuel C. Lawrence =

American politician

Samuel Crocker Lawrence
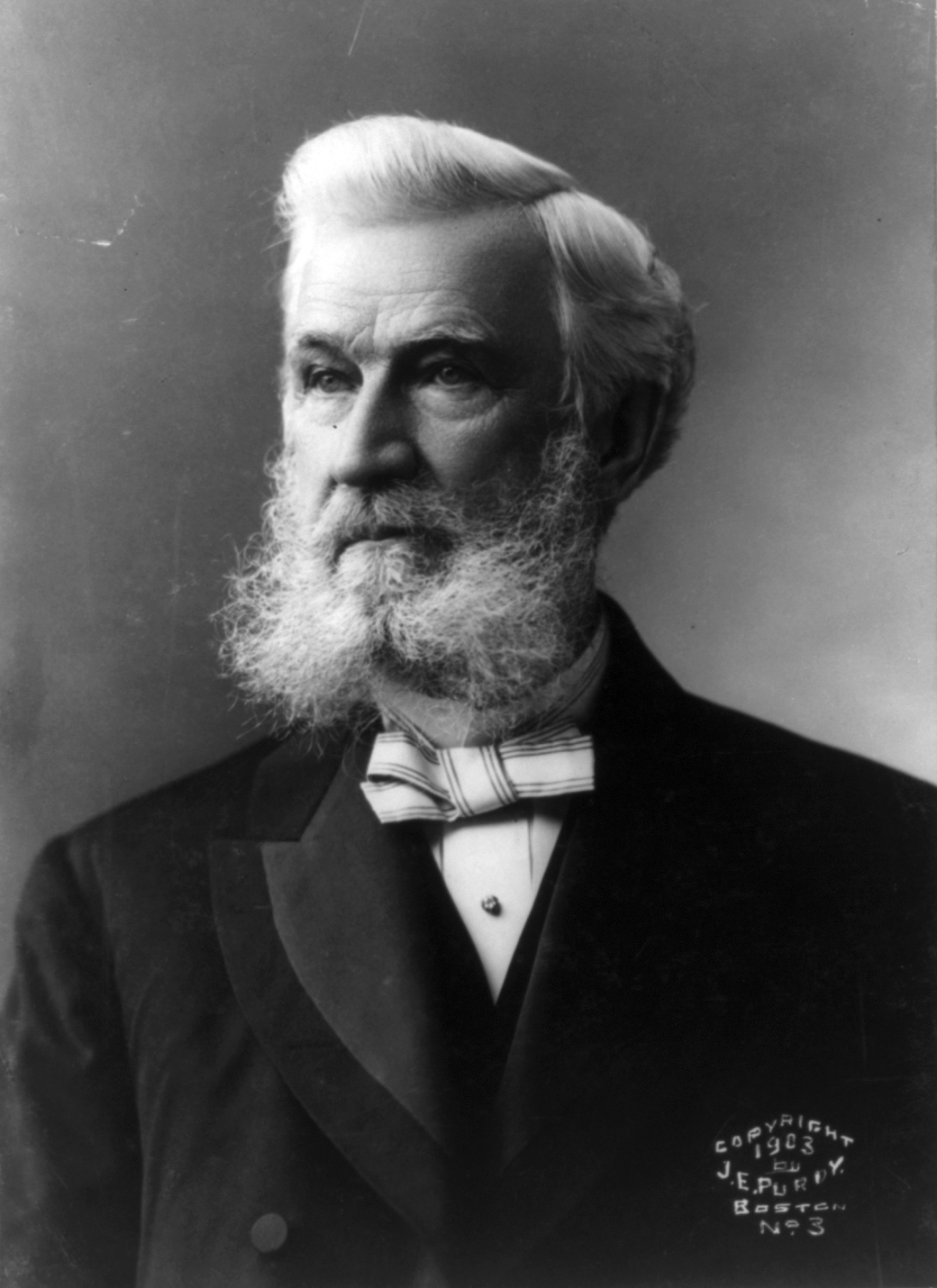

1st Mayor of Medford, Massachusetts
- In office 1893–1894
- Preceded by: Board of Selectmen
- Succeeded by: Baxter E. Perry

Personal details
- Born: November 22, 1832 Medford, Massachusetts
- Died: September 24, 1911 (aged 78) Medford, Massachusetts
- Party: Republican
- Spouse(s): Carrie Rebecca Badger, m. 1859
- Education: Lawrence Academy, Harvard College, 1855

Military service
- Allegiance: United States of America; Union
- Branch/service: Union Army
- Rank: Colonel
- Commands: 5th Massachusetts Militia Regiment
- Battles/wars: American Civil War: First Battle of Bull Run

Samuel Crocker Lawrence (November 22, 1832 – September 24, 1911) was a Massachusetts politician who served as the first Mayor of Medford, Massachusetts. Lawrence was born in Medford on November 22, 1832, to Daniel Lawrence and Elizabeth (Crocker) Lawrence.

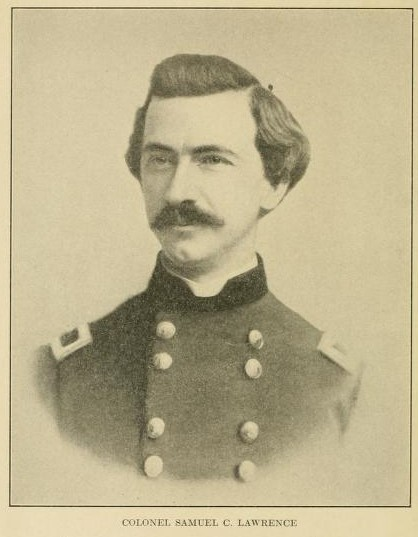
Colonel Lawrence

During the American Civil War, he served as colonel of the 5th Massachusetts Militia Regiment. After the war he became a Veteran Companion of the Military Order of the Loyal Legion of the United States.

In 1869 he was elected captain of the Ancient and Honorable Artillery Company of Massachusetts.

A highly active Freemason, Lawrence served as Most Worshipful Grand Master of Massachusetts from 1881 to 1883. In 1884 he was installed as a 33rd Degree Freemason. From 1909 to 1910, he served as the Sovereign Grand Commander of the Northern Masonic Jurisdiction of the Scottish Rite.

He was a director of the Eastern, Maine Central and Boston and Maine railroads.

Political offices
Preceded by Board of Selectmen	Mayor of Medford, Massachusetts; 1895 – January 4, 1897	Succeeded by Baxter E. Perry
