= Anthony Mandile =

American politician (1946–2002)

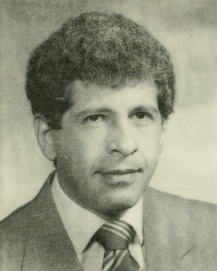
- Portrait of Anthony Mandile

Member of the Massachusetts House of Representatives from the 10th Middlesex District
- In office 1987–1993
- Preceded by: A. Joseph DeNucci
- Succeeded by: Karen O'Donnell
- In office 1995–1997
- Preceded by: Karen O'Donnell
- Succeeded by: Peter Koutoujian

Personal details
- Born: August 14, 1946 Waltham, Massachusetts, U.S.
- Died: January 5, 2002 (aged 55) Boston, Massachusetts, U.S.
- Party: Democratic
- Occupation: Politician

Anthony M. Mandile (August 14, 1946 – January 5, 2002) was an American politician who represented the 10th Middlesex District in the Massachusetts House of Representatives from 1987 to 1993 and again from 1995 to 1997. He was also a member of the Waltham City Council from 1974 to 1997.
