= 1921 Boston mayoral election =

Election in Massachusetts, United States

- December 13, 1921

Candidate	James Michael Curley	John R. Murphy	Charles S. O'Connor
Party	Nonpartisan	Nonpartisan	Nonpartisan
Popular vote	74,261	71,791	10,844
Percentage	46.1%	44.5%	6.7%
Mayor before election
Andrew James Peters
Elected mayor
James Michael Curley

The Boston mayoral election of 1921 occurred on Tuesday, December 13, 1921. James Michael Curley, who had previously served as Mayor of Boston (1914–1918), was elected for the second time, defeating three other candidates.

In 1918, the Massachusetts state legislature had passed legislation making the Mayor of Boston ineligible to serve consecutive terms. Thus, incumbent Andrew James Peters was unable to run for re-election.

Due to the ratification of the Nineteenth Amendment in 1920, this was the first Boston municipal election that women could vote in.

Curley was inaugurated on Monday, February 6, 1922.

== Candidates ==
- Charles S. Baxter, former mayor of Medford from 1901 to 1904
- James Michael Curley, former member of the United States House of Representatives from 1913 to 1914, mayor of Boston from 1914 to 1918
- John R. Murphy, former commissioner of the Boston Fire Department
- Charles S. O'Connor, member of the Boston School Committee

Withdrew

- Joseph C. Pelletier, district attorney of Suffolk County, Massachusetts

== Results ==
election winner James Michael Curley speaking at his February 6, 1922 mayoral inauguration

Candidates	General Election	
Candidates	Votes	%
James Michael Curley	74,261	46.1%
John R. Murphy	71,791	44.5%
Charles S. O'Connor	10,844	6.7%
Charles S. Baxter	4,268	2.6%
all others	22	0.0%

== See also ==
- List of mayors of Boston, Massachusetts
