= 5th Massachusetts =

5th Massachusetts may refer to:

- 5th Massachusetts Regiment, a unit of infantry during the American Revolutionary War
- 5th Regiment Massachusetts Volunteer Militia, a 19th-century peacetime militia unit which saw active service during the American Civil War
- 5th Regiment Massachusetts Colored Volunteer Cavalry, an African-American volunteer unit during the American Civil War
