= Edward H. Larkin =

American politician (1877–1944)

10th Mayor of Medford, Massachusetts
- In office 1927–1931
- Preceded by: Richard B. Coolidge
- Succeeded by: John H. Burke

President of the Medford, Massachusetts Board of Aldermen

Member of the Medford, Massachusetts Board of Aldermen

Personal details
- Born: 1877
- Died: 1944 (aged 66–67)
- Children: Edward Alexander Larkin

Edward H. Larkin (1877 – 1944) was a Massachusetts politician who served as the tenth mayor of Medford, Massachusetts.

== Notes ==
Political offices
Preceded by Richard B. Coolidge	Mayor of Medford, Massachusetts; 1927–1931	Succeeded by John H. Burke
