= Paul Donato =

American politician

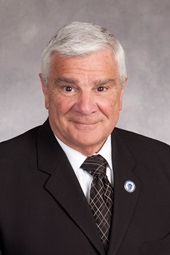

Member of the Massachusetts House of Representatives from the 35th Middlesex District
- Incumbent
- Assumed office January 3, 2001
- Preceded by: Mike Festa

28th Mayor of Medford
- In office 1980–1985
- Preceded by: Eugene F. Grant
- Succeeded by: Marilyn Porreca

Member of the Medford City Council
- In office 1996–2000
- In office 1976–1985

Personal details
- Born: October 27, 1941 (age 84) Boston, Massachusetts, U.S.
- Party: Democratic
- Education: University of Massachusetts Boston
- Occupation: Manufacturer's Representative; Politician

Paul J. Donato (born October 27, 1941, in Boston) is an American politician who currently represents the 35th Middlesex District in the Massachusetts House of Representatives. He previously served as a member of the Medford, Massachusetts, school committee from 1972 to 1975 and the city council from 1976 to 1985 and again from 1996 to 2000. While serving on the council, Donato also served as deputy mayor from 1978 to 1979, mayor from 1980 to 1985, and council president from 1999 to 2000.

== See also ==
- 2019–2020 Massachusetts legislature
- 2021–2022 Massachusetts legislature
