= Patrick Guerriero =

American politician

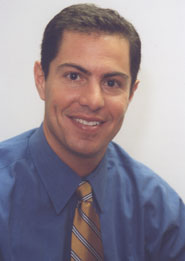

Deputy Chief of Staff for Governor of Massachusetts
- In office May, 2001 – 2002
- Governor: Jane Swift

Mayor of Melrose, Massachusetts
- In office January, 1998 – May 2001
- Preceded by: Richard Lyons
- Succeeded by: Robert Dolan

Member of the Massachusetts House of Representatives from the 35th Middlesex district
- In office November 2, 1993 – January 3, 1998
- Preceded by: Robert M McCarthy
- Succeeded by: Mike Festa

Personal details
- Born: March 3, 1968 (age 58) Melrose, Massachusetts, U.S.
- Party: Republican
- Education: Catholic University of America

Patrick Guerriero (born March 3, 1968) is a former Massachusetts state legislator, mayor, and advocate for marriage equality. In 2002, after serving as then-Governor Jane Swift's deputy chief of staff, Guerriero became the nation's first openly gay candidate for lieutenant governor when he was chosen by Swift to be her running mate.

Guerriero entered politics when he served as president of the Liberty Education Forum and Log Cabin Republicans from January 1, 2003 to September 1, 2006. From 1993 to 2001, Guerriero won five consecutive elections.

== Early life ==
Guerriero was born to an Italian immigrant, mason father and a social worker mother. He worked his way through college, spending summers mixing cement and hauling bricks for his family's masonry business. Guerriero attended The Catholic University of America in Washington, DC, where he played soccer and graduated Summa cum laude in 1990. The next year, Guerriero attended Boston College's Thomas P. O'Neill Jr. Fellowship in American Government Program. After college, Guerriero moved to Melrose to manage the successful mayoral campaign of Richard Lyons.

== Political career ==
=== State representative ===
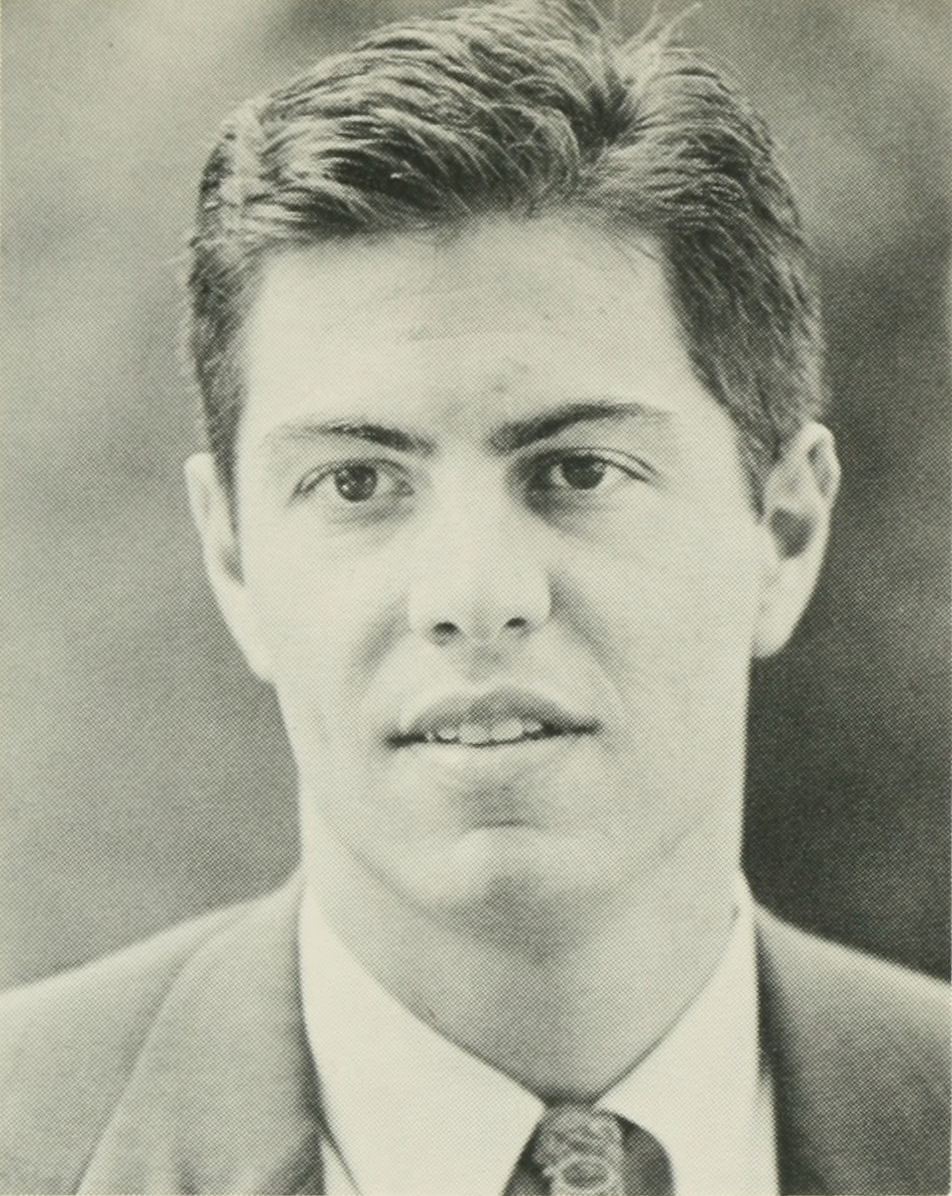
Guerriero in 1995.

In 1993, Guerriero was elected to the Massachusetts House of Representatives (35th Middlesex District). He went on to twice win re-election. In the House his legislative committee assignments included, Ways and Means, Ethics, Insurance, Health and Human Services, and Long-Term Debt and Capital Expenditures. He supported initiatives related to lower taxes, limited government expenditure, improved public schools, public safety, and welfare reform. Guerriero was a staunch supporter of the 1993 Education Reform Act that required students to pass standardized graduation tests (MCAS). He was also an advocate for gay and lesbian issues, effecting strict anti-hate crimes legislation and increased AIDS awareness funding.

Guerriero was awarded the John F. Kennedy Library's Fenn Award for politicians 35 years of age and younger on November 10, 1998.

=== Mayor of Melrose, Massachusetts ===
In 1998, Guerriero was elected mayor of the city of Melrose, Massachusetts. He served two consecutive terms, and received more than 80% of the vote in both elections. As during his tenure, Moody's Investors Service upgraded the city's bond rating. During his tenure as mayor, Guerriero created a "Civility Initiative" which encouraged residents to show each other respect and courtesy. For this project he received the City Livability Award at the U.S. Mayor's Association 2000 City Livability Awards. In 2001, the Massachusetts Council of Human Service Providers named Guerriero the municipal official of the year.

Guerriero stepped down in May 2001 to accept the position of deputy chief of staff with acting Governor Jane Swift's administration.

=== Deputy Chief of Staff for the Governor of Massachusetts ===
In May 2001, Guerriero accepted the position of deputy chief of staff to acting Massachusetts Governor Jane Swift. On January 3, 2002, Swift named Guerriero her running mate. In March, Swift announced that while she was pulling out of the race for Governor, she openly supported Guerriero's continued run as Lieutenant Governor on the Republican ticket.

== Advocacy ==
Guerriero is an advocate for LGBT equality, having appeared on major television programs such as Nightline, Hardball with Chris Matthews, The Today Show, and The O'Reilly Factor. He has written op-eds for publications including The Wall Street Journal and The Denver Post and has been profiled in The New York Times Magazine, The L.A. Times Magazine, The Washington Post, and The Advocate. Guerriero is the recipient of the U.S. Mayor's Association 2000 City Livability Award for his nationally-recognized "Civility Initiative" and the 1998 Fenn Award for Political Leadership from the John F. Kennedy Library's New Frontier Society.

=== Log Cabin Republicans ===
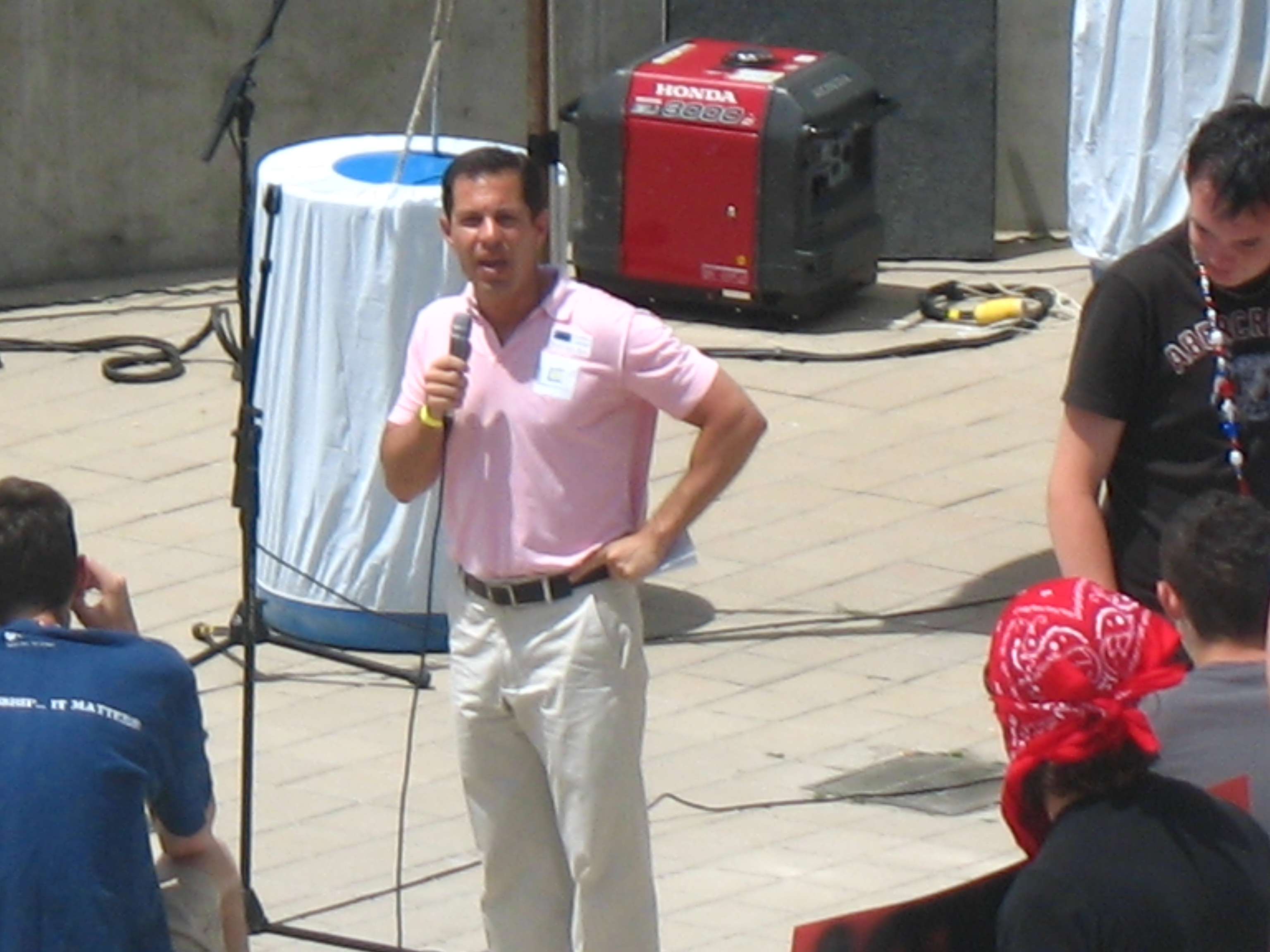
Guerriero on stage at the 2006 Utah Pride Festival

On January 1, 2003, Guerriero succeeded Rich Tafel as the leader of the Log Cabin Republicans. While at Log Cabin, he praised the Massachusetts Supreme Judicial Court's 2003 decision in the case of Goodridge v. Department of Public Health as a conservative ruling supporting stable families, relationships, and society, limited government, individual liberty, and religious freedom. In early 2004, Patrick gained national recognition for successfully challenging President George W. Bush - launching the first national television ad that helped defeat Bush's proposed Federal Marriage Amendment. In October 2004, Patrick filed Log Cabin Republicans v. United States challenging the constitutionality of the "Don't Ask, Don't Tell" policy. It was not until the White House came under Democratic control, however, that any significant legislative progress toward the repeal of the policy was made. U.S. President Barack Obama signed the legislation repealing "Don't Ask, Don't Tell" in December 2010.

In 2013, Guerriero was a signatory to an amicus curiae brief submitted to the Supreme Court in support of same-sex marriage during the Hollingsworth v. Perry case.

=== The Gill Action Fund ===
On September 1, 2006, Guerriero became the first executive director of the Gill Action Fund, an organization working to advance gay and lesbian equality through the legislative, political, and electoral process. During his tenure, Guerriero oversaw a national network of donors contributing more than $15 million to political campaigns and organizations in dozens of states with the aim of electing equal-rights politicians and advancing or blocking legislation. In 2006, of the 68 campaigns supported by Gill Action, 56 were successful. Gill Action under Guerriero also advocated for passage of state laws on nondiscrimination and relationship recognition in 13 states.

Guerriero served as executive director until June 30, 2011.

=== Civitas Public Affairs Group ===
Guerriero is a founding partner of Civitas Public Affairs Group, a Washington, D.C.–based government affairs firm. Civitas Public Affairs Group provides bipartisan government relations, issue-based donor-giving strategies, and public-policy campaign management to individuals, non-profits, and corporations.

Political offices
Preceded by Ronald W. Alley	Mayor of Melrose, Massachusetts; 1998 – 2001	Succeeded by Robert J. Dolan
