= Michael J. McGlynn =

American politician

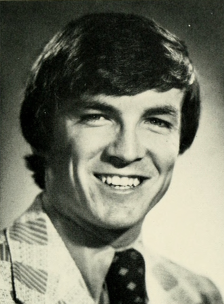
- Portrait of member of the Massachusetts House of Representatives

31st Mayor of Medford, Massachusetts
- In office January 3, 1988 – January 3, 2016
- Preceded by: Marilyn Porreca
- Succeeded by: Stephanie M. Burke

Member of the Massachusetts House of Representatives for the 37th Middlesex District
- In office January 3, 1977 – January 3, 1988

Personal details
- Born: April 23, 1953 (age 73) Medford, Massachusetts
- Party: Democratic
- Spouse: Sheila Halmkin
- Children: Kathleen; Jennifer; Amanda
- Education: UMass Boston St. Anselm College, New Hampshire
- Website: www.Medford.org/mayor

Michael J. McGlynn served as the 31st Mayor of Medford, Massachusetts, from 1988–2016. He also served from 1977–1988 as a member of the Massachusetts House of Representatives representing the 37th Middlesex District (Medford/Malden).

== Education ==
McGlynn graduated from Arlington Catholic High School in 1971. He then attended University of Massachusetts Boston, where he graduated in 1976 with a bachelor's degree in political science/ History.

== Family life ==
McGlynn is married to Sheila (Halmkin) McGlynn and they have 3 daughters, Kathleen, Jennifer, and Amanda. He is the son of former Medford Mayor & City Councilor John J. McGlynn.

== Mayoralty ==
McGlynn made a number of successful contributions as Mayor for the city of Medford in his 28 years in office.

- He championed the successful initiative to rebuild all public elementary and middle schools in Medford, because the previous schools were all 80 years or older. It cost the state $110,000,000, and was completed in 2003.
- Under a new capital improvement plan he rebuilt all fire stations, city's parks and neighborhoods and infrastructure.
- He serves as a member of the Advisory Commission on Local Government appointed by Governor Paul Cellucci and Jane Swift.
- McGlynn Has previously served as President of the Massachusetts Mayors Association and Massachusetts Municipal Association. He is a member of Metropolitan Mayors Commission and United States Conference of Mayors.
- He is a Chairperson of The Mystic Valley Development Commission which is working on a project called Rivers Edge. Rivers Edge is a Program focusing on mixed-use development of residential, office and open space areas.
- The city of Medford has been selected a "Tree City USA" since 1999 under his leadership.
- In 2004, McGlynn Co-chaired a Caroling Festival called "Medford's Jingle Bell Committee's Caroling Festival" which led to Medford being placed in the Guinness Book Of World Records for the largest group of carol singers.
- In 2013 he was elected to his 13th term and is the longest active serving mayor in Massachusetts, making him the "Dean of Mass Mayors".
- He had been the only mayor elected since Medford changed to a Plan A form of government.
- He is currently the chairman of the National League of Cities Advisory Council.

Political offices
Preceded by Robert M. Penta	Member of the Massachusetts House of Representatives; 37th Middlesex District; January 3, 1977 – January 3, 1988	Succeeded by Vincent Ciampa
Preceded by Marilyn Porreca	31st Mayor of Medford, Massachusetts; January 3, 1988 – January 3, 2016	Succeeded by Stephanie M. Burke
