= 2013 Massachusetts's 5th congressional district special election =

- December 10, 2013

Massachusetts's 5th congressional district
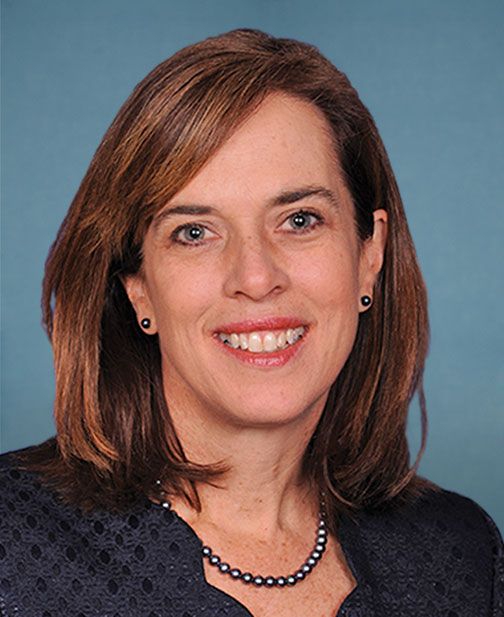

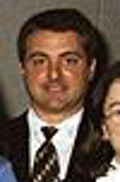
Nominee	Katherine Clark	Frank Addivinola
Party	Democratic	Republican
Popular vote	40,172	19,319
Percentage	65.8%	31.5%
- Municipality results Clark: 50–60% 60–70% 70–80% >90% Addivinola: 50–60%
U.S. Representative before election
Ed Markey
Democratic
Elected U.S. Representative
Katherine Clark
Democratic

A special election for Massachusetts's 5th congressional district took place on December 10, 2013, due to the resignation of Democratic Congressman Ed Markey following his election to the United States Senate in a special election on June 25, 2013. Primary elections were held on October 15, in which Democratic state senator Katherine Clark and Republican Frank Addivinola won their party nominations. State law required that Governor Deval Patrick call a special election between 145 and 160 days after the vacancy became official. On December 10, Clark easily defeated Addivinola with almost 2/3 of the vote, holding the seat for the Democrats. Clark's win marked the 92nd consecutive U.S. House loss by Republicans in Massachusetts since 1996.

== Democratic primary ==
=== Candidates ===
==== Declared ====
- Will Brownsberger, state senator from Belmont
- Katherine Clark, state senator from Melrose
- Peter Koutoujian, sheriff of Middlesex County and former state representative from Waltham
- Martin Long, former member of the Lexington school committee
- Paul Maisano
- Carl Sciortino, state representative from Somerville
- Karen Spilka, state senator from Ashland

==== Declined ====
- Warren Tolman, former state senator from Watertown

=== Endorsements ===
Katherine Clark

State officials

- Paul Brodeur, state representative of Massachusetts, 32nd Middlesex District
- Martha Coakley, attorney general of Massachusetts
- Marjorie Decker, state representative of Massachusetts, 25th Middlesex District
- Susan Fargo, former Massachusetts state senator
- Allyson Schwartz, U.S. representative for Pennsylvania's 13th congressional district

Local officials

- Robert J. Dolan, mayor of Melrose, Massachusetts

Organizations

- EMILY's List
- Melrose Democratic City Committee
- Winchester Democratic Town Committee
- Women's Campaign Fund

Labor unions

- APWU Local 100
- IBEW Local 123
- IBEW Local 2222
- IBEW Local 2321
- International Association of Fire Fighters Melrose Local 1617, Executive Board
- Ironworkers Local 7
- NAGE/IBPO/SEIU Local 5000
- Teamsters Local 25
- United Steelworkers Union Local 12012

Newspapers

- The Boston Globe
Carl Sciortino

State officials

- Keith Ellison, U.S. representative for Minnesota's 5th congressional district
- Alan Grayson, U.S. representative for Florida's 9th congressional district
- Raúl Grijalva, U.S. representative for Arizona's 3rd congressional district
- Jared Polis, U.S. representative for Colorado's 2nd congressional district
- Mark Takano, U.S. representative for California's 41st congressional district

Organizations

- The Congressional Progressive Caucus

=== Polling ===
Poll source	Date(s) administered	Sample size	Margin of error	Will Brownsberger	Katherine Clark	Peter Koutoujian	Martin Long	Paul Maisano	Carl Sciortino	Karen Spilka	Undecided
Gerstein Bocian Agne*	September 23–25, 2013	500	± 4.4%	12%	27%	16%	—	—	15%	18%	12%
GreenbergQuinlanRosner^	September 22–24, 2013	400	± 4.9%	11%	19%	15%	—	—	11%	18%	26%
Emerson College	September 13–17, 2013	310	± 4%	11.3%	23.9%	19%	1.3%	1%	5.2%	15.5%	22.6%
GreenbergQuinlanRosner^	July 18–23, 2013	405	± 4.9%	11%	15%	12%	—	—	4%	14%	43%

- * Internal poll for Katherine Clark campaign
- ^ Internal poll for Karen Spilka campaign

=== Results ===
Democratic primary results by municipality Clark: 30–40%; 40–50%; 50–60%; 60–70%; 70–80%; Koutoujian: 30–40%; 40–50%; 70–80%; Sciortino: 40–50%; Brownsberger: 60–70%; Spilka: 30–40%; 40–50%; 50–60%; 60–70%; 70–80%; 80–90%

2013 Democratic primary results - Massachusetts's 5th congressional district special election
Party	Candidate	Votes	%
Democratic	Katherine Clark	21,959	31.5
Democratic	Peter Koutoujian	15,290	21.9
Democratic	Carl Sciortino	11,185	16.0
Democratic	Will Brownsberger	10,142	14.6
Democratic	Karen Spilka	9,057	13.0
Democratic	Paul Masiano	1,498	2.2
Democratic	Martin Long	394	0.6

== Republican primary ==
=== Candidates ===
==== Declared ====
- Frank Addivinola, lawyer and candidate for this seat in 2012
- Mike Stopa, physicist and candidate for Massachusetts's 3rd congressional district in 2010
- Tom Tierney, actuary and 2012 nominee for this seat

=== Polling ===
Poll source	Date(s) administered	Sample size	Margin of error	Frank Addivinola	Mike Stopa	Tom Tierney	Undecided
Emerson College	September 13–17, 2013	107	± 9%	13.1%	6.5%	24.3%	56.1%

=== Results ===
2013 Republican primary results - Massachusetts's 5th congressional district special election
Party	Candidate	Votes	%
Republican	Frank Addivinola	4,759	48.5
Republican	Mike Stopa	2,477	25.3
Republican	Tom Tierney	2,456	25.1

== General election ==
Massachusetts's 5th congressional district special election, 2013
Party	Candidate	Votes	%
Democratic	Katherine Clark	40,303	65.8
Republican	Frank Addivinola	19,328	31.5
Independent	James Aulenti	996	1.6
Independent	James Hall	452	0.7
Write-in		217	0.4
Total votes		61,380	100.0
Democratic hold			
