= Massachusetts House of Representatives' 10th Middlesex district =

American legislative district

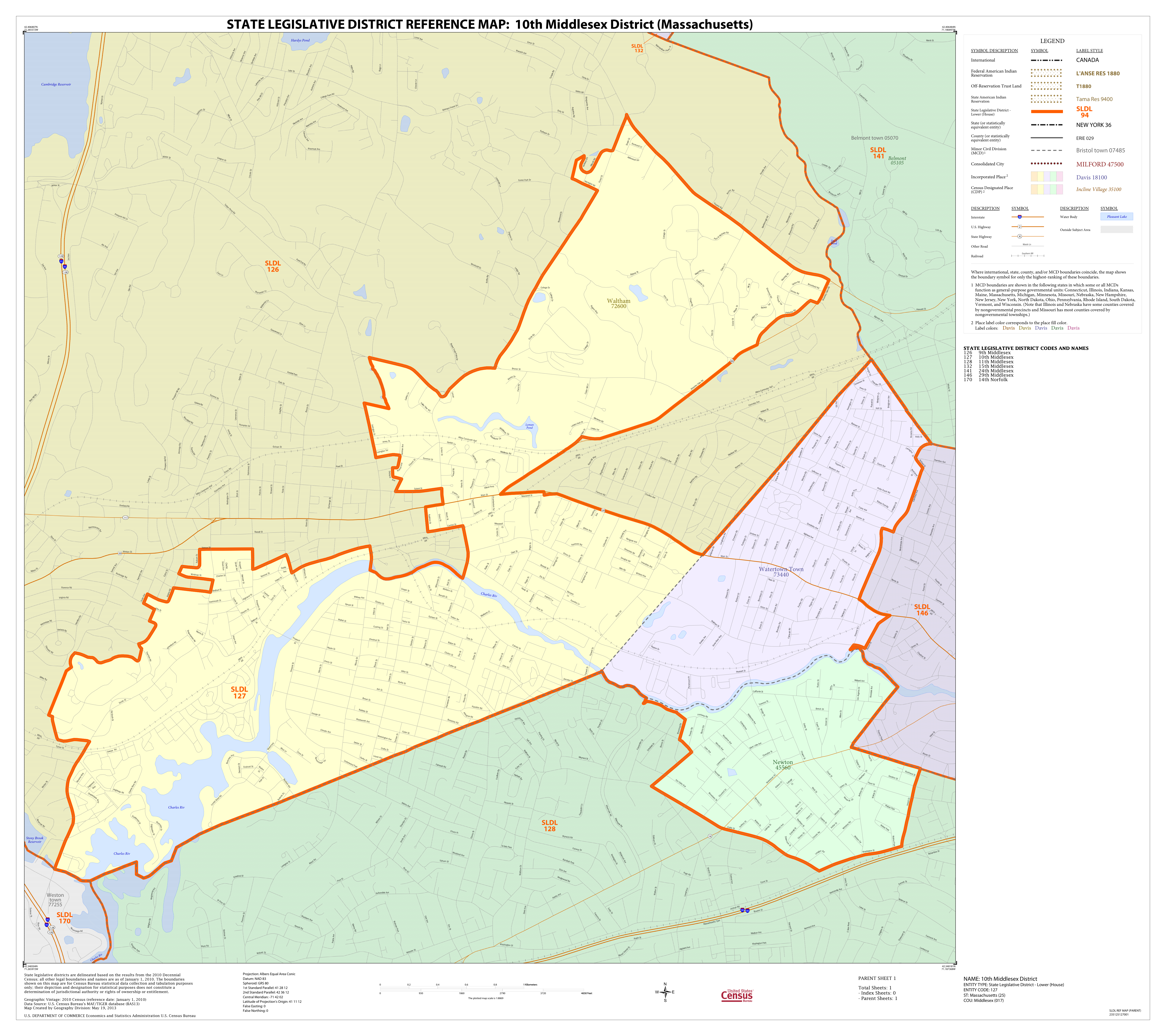
Map of Massachusetts House of Representatives' 10th Middlesex district, based on the 2010 United States census.

Massachusetts House of Representatives' 10th Middlesex district in the United States is one of 160 legislative districts included in the lower house of the Massachusetts General Court. It covers part of Middlesex County. Democrat John Lawn of Watertown has represented the district since 2011.

== Locales represented ==
The district includes the following localities:

- part of Newton
- part of Waltham
- part of Watertown

The current district geographic boundary overlaps with those of the Massachusetts Senate's 1st Middlesex and Norfolk, 3rd Middlesex, and 2nd Suffolk and Middlesex districts.

=== Former locale ===
The district previously covered Brighton, circa 1872.

== Representatives ==
- George M. Brooks, circa 1858
- George W. Warren, circa 1859
- Joseph H. Cannell, circa 1888
- Frederick P. Glazier, circa 1920
- Howard Symmes Russell, 1949–1954
- Eleanor M. Campobasso, 1965–1978
- A. Joseph DeNucci, 1979–1986
- Anthony Mandile, 1987–1993; 1995–1997
- Karen O'Donnell, 1993–1995
- Peter Koutoujian, 1997–2011
- John J. Lawn, Jr., 2011–current

== See also ==
- List of Massachusetts House of Representatives elections
- List of Massachusetts General Courts
- List of former districts of the Massachusetts House of Representatives
- Other Middlesex County districts of the Massachusetts House of Representatives: 1st, 2nd, 3rd, 4th, 5th, 6th, 7th, 8th, 9th, 11th, 12th, 13th, 14th, 15th, 16th, 17th, 18th, 19th, 20th, 21st, 22nd, 23rd, 24th, 25th, 26th, 27th, 28th, 29th, 30th, 31st, 32nd, 33rd, 34th, 35th, 36th, 37th

== Images ==
Portraits of legislators

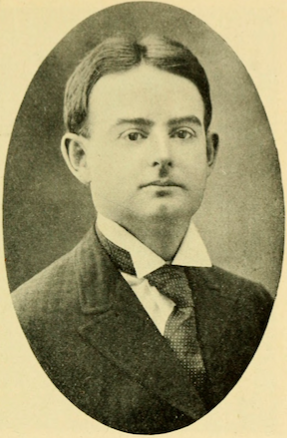
Cornelius Lynch

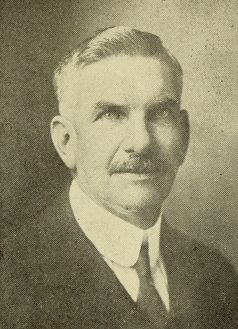
Rowland Harriman

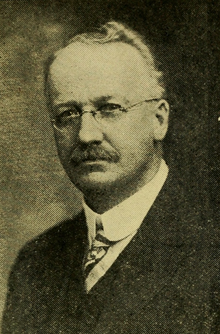
Frederick Glazier

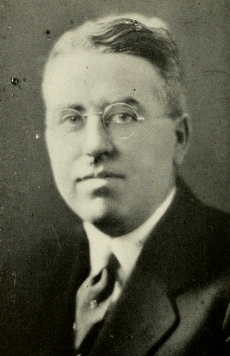
Frank Sheridan

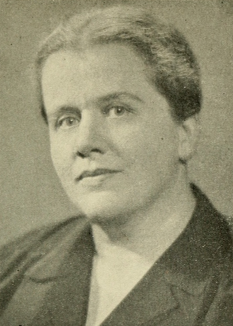
Fannie M. Buzzell

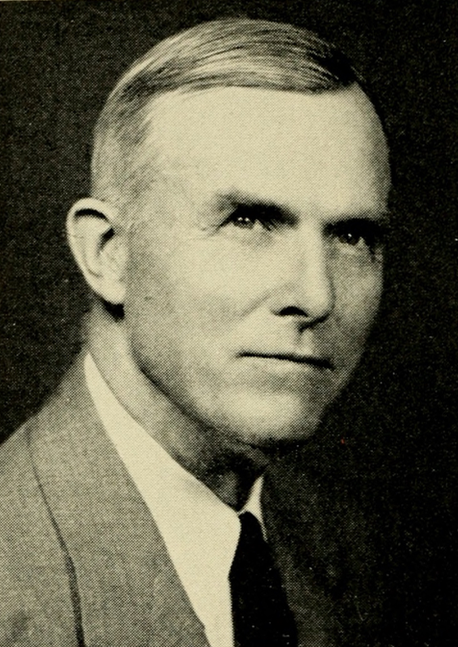
Howard Symmes Russell

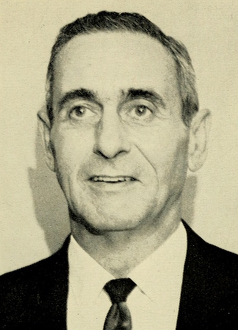
Wilfred Balthazar

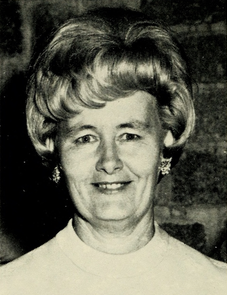
Eleanor Campobasso

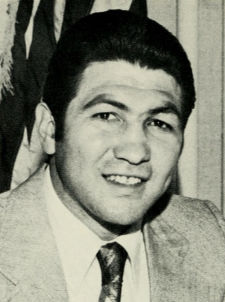
A. Joseph DeNucci

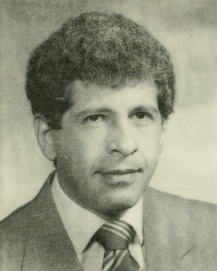
Anthony Mandile

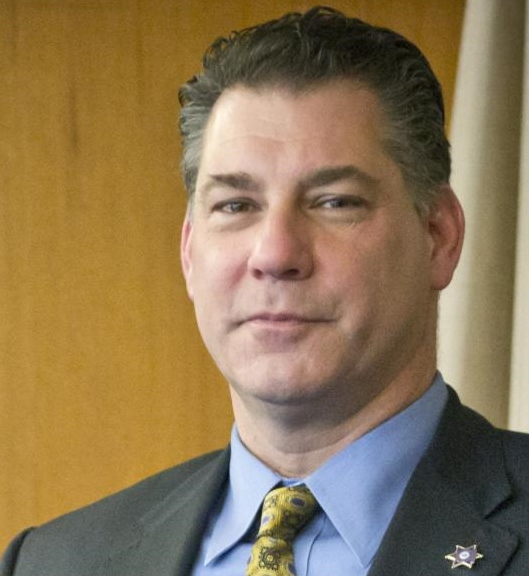
Peter Koutoujian
