= Richard B. Coolidge =

American politician (1879-1957)

Richard Bradford Coolidge
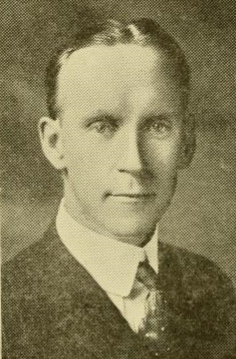

9th Mayor of Medford, Massachusetts
- In office January 2, 1923 – 1926
- Preceded by: Benjamin Haines
- Succeeded by: Edward H. Larkin

Member of the Massachusetts House of Representatives from the 25th Middlesex District
- In office 1920–1922

Member of the Medford, Massachusetts Board of Aldermen from Ward 4
- In office 1917–1919

Personal details
- Born: September 14, 1879 Portland, Maine
- Died: January 18, 1957 (aged 77)
- Party: Republican
- Education: Tufts College; Harvard Law School

Richard Bradford Coolidge (September 14, 1879 – January 18, 1957) was a Massachusetts politician.

== Early life and family ==
Coolidge was born in the Deering Center area of Portland, Maine. He was brother of Massachusetts politician and Lieutenant Governor Arthur W. Coolidge. He was the fourth cousin of President Calvin Coolidge.

== Education ==
Coolidge graduated from Tufts College in 1902 and served as a trustee of the school from 1924 to 1944 and from 1953 to 1957. He attended Harvard Law School.

== Career as an attorney ==
Coolidge practiced in the law firm "French and Curtiss."

== Political service ==
From 1920 to 1922, Coolidge represented Medford and Winchester in the Massachusetts House of Representatives, where he served as the clerk of the judiciary committee. Coolidge served as the mayor of Medford, Middlesex County, Massachusetts, United States, from 1923 to 1926. He later served as a delegate to the Republican National Convention from Massachusetts in 1928.

== Death ==
Coolidge died in Concord, Massachusetts in 1957.

== See also ==
- 1920 Massachusetts legislature
- 1921–1922 Massachusetts legislature

Political offices
| Preceded by Benjamin Haines | Mayor of Medford, Massachusetts; January 2, 1923–1926 | Succeeded by Edward H. Larkin |
| Preceded by | Member of the Massachusetts House of Representatives; 25th Middlesex District; 1920–1922 | Succeeded by |
