= Mike Festa =

American politician

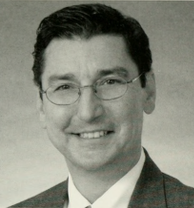
Portrait of member of the Massachusetts House of Representatives

Mike Festa was state director of AARP Massachusetts, based in Boston, from January 2013 to July 2024, which serves 750,000 members age 50+ in the commonwealth.

He had a longstanding law practice in his hometown of Melrose. He is the former President of the Carroll Center for the Blind, located in Newton, Massachusetts. He was also an adjunct professor at Suffolk University, Graduate School of Public Management. Festa formerly served as the Secretary of Elder Affairs for the Commonwealth of Massachusetts. His resignation as Secretary of Elder Affairs was announced by the Governor's Office on January 31, 2009. He was formerly the state representative for Melrose, Massachusetts and parts of Wakefield, Massachusetts. Festa ran for Middlesex County District Attorney in 2007 but dropped out of the race.

== Early career ==
He attended Melrose High School, 1972; Tufts University, B.A. 1976; Suffolk University Law School, J.D. 1979

From 1979 to 1981 he held office as the assistant district attorney, Middlesex County. Festa has also been an attorney in private practice since 1981.

== Elected office ==
- Massachusetts House of Representatives, 1999-2007 (32nd Middlesex District),
- Vice Chair of Joint Committee on State Administration & Regulatory Oversight,
- Melrose School Committee 1974–78,
- Melrose Board of Aldermen, At-Large, 1978–80, 1992–98.
  - Festa was instrumental in the passage of Melanie's Law, a bill designed to crack down on repeat drunk drivers. The legislation, named after Melanie Powell, a 13-year-old Marshfield girl killed by a drunk driver, was languishing in committee when Festa insisted the leadership bring it up for a vote and eventual passage in the full house.**Festa also was the lead sponsor of the "equal choice for seniors and the disabled" bill, which became law in 2006.

Other activities:

- Fmr. Secretary of the Executive Office of Elder Affairs, Commonwealth of Massachusetts
- Fmr. Democratic State Committeeman, Massachusetts Democratic Party
- Former Chair, Melrose Democratic City Committee;
- Chair Emeritus, Criminal Justice Board of Directors, Council of State Governments;
- Guest Garden Host, MMTV's cable show "Le Jardin";
- Fmr. Member and Past President, Malden Court Bar Association;

== Personal life ==
Festa is married to Sandra Festa (since 1980), with two children: Michael, a computer engineer and founder of 3XR, Wakefield, Massachusetts, who graduated from George Washington University in 2006, and Danielle, a painter, graphic artist and web-designer, who graduated from UMASS Amherst in 2007. He has four grandchildren, Tommy, Alex, Heidi and Lily.

Massachusetts House of Representatives
| Preceded by Patrick Guerriero | Member of the Massachusetts House of Representatives from the 35th Middlesex district 1999–2003 | Succeeded by Paul Donato |
| Preceded by Rachel Kaprielian | Member of the Massachusetts House of Representatives from the 32nd Middlesex district 2003–2007 | Succeeded by Katherine Clark |
