= John Granara =

American lawyer (1943–2025)

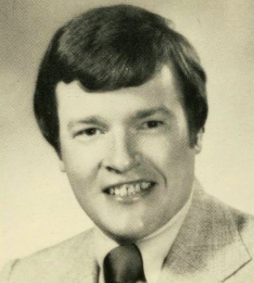
- Granara in 1977

Special Sheriff of Middlesex County, Massachusetts
- In office November 26, 2010 – January 14, 2011
- Preceded by: James DiPaola
- Succeeded by: Peter Koutoujian

Member of the Massachusetts House of Representatives for the 20th Middlesex District
- In office 1977–1979
- Preceded by: Frederick Dello Russo

Personal details
- Born: January 23, 1943 Medford, Massachusetts, U.S.
- Died: January 6, 2025 (aged 81)
- Party: Democratic
- Education: Boston College; Suffolk University Law School
- Occupation: Attorney

John R. Granara (January 23, 1943 – January 6, 2025) was an American attorney who served as a member of the Massachusetts House of Representatives and as Special Sheriff of Middlesex County, Massachusetts.

== Early life ==
Granara was born on January 23, 1943, in Medford, Massachusetts. He graduated from Matignon High School, Boston College, and Suffolk University Law School.

== Political career ==
From 1974 to 1977, Granara was a member of the Medford school committee. In 1976 he was elected to the Massachusetts House of Representatives in the 20th Middlesex district. Due to redistricting, he was forced to face fellow incumbent Angelo Marotta in 1978. He lost to Marotta 49% to 41%. When Marotta retired in 1988, Granara ran for the seat again, but lost in the Democratic primary to Anthony P. Giglio.

In 1996, Granara was a coordinator for James DiPaola's campaign for Middlesex County Sheriff. After DiPaola took office, Granara became the chief legal counsel to the Middlesex County Sheriff’s Office. Following DiPaola's suicide on November 26, 2010, Granara served as Special Sheriff of Middlesex County until the appointment of Peter Koutoujian by Governor Deval Patrick.

== Death ==
Granara died on January 6, 2025, at age 81.
