= Karen O'Donnell =

American politician

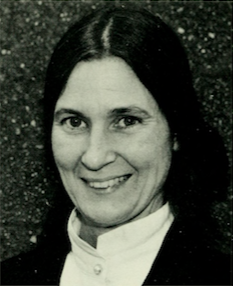

Member of the Massachusetts House of Representatives from the 10th Middlesex district
- In office 1993–1995
- Succeeded by: Peter Koutoujian

Karen O'Donnell was an American Democratic politician from Waltham, Massachusetts. She represented the 10th Middlesex district in the Massachusetts House of Representatives from 1993 to 1995.

== See also ==
- 1993-1994 Massachusetts legislature
