= Massachusetts House of Representatives' 35th Middlesex district =

American legislative district

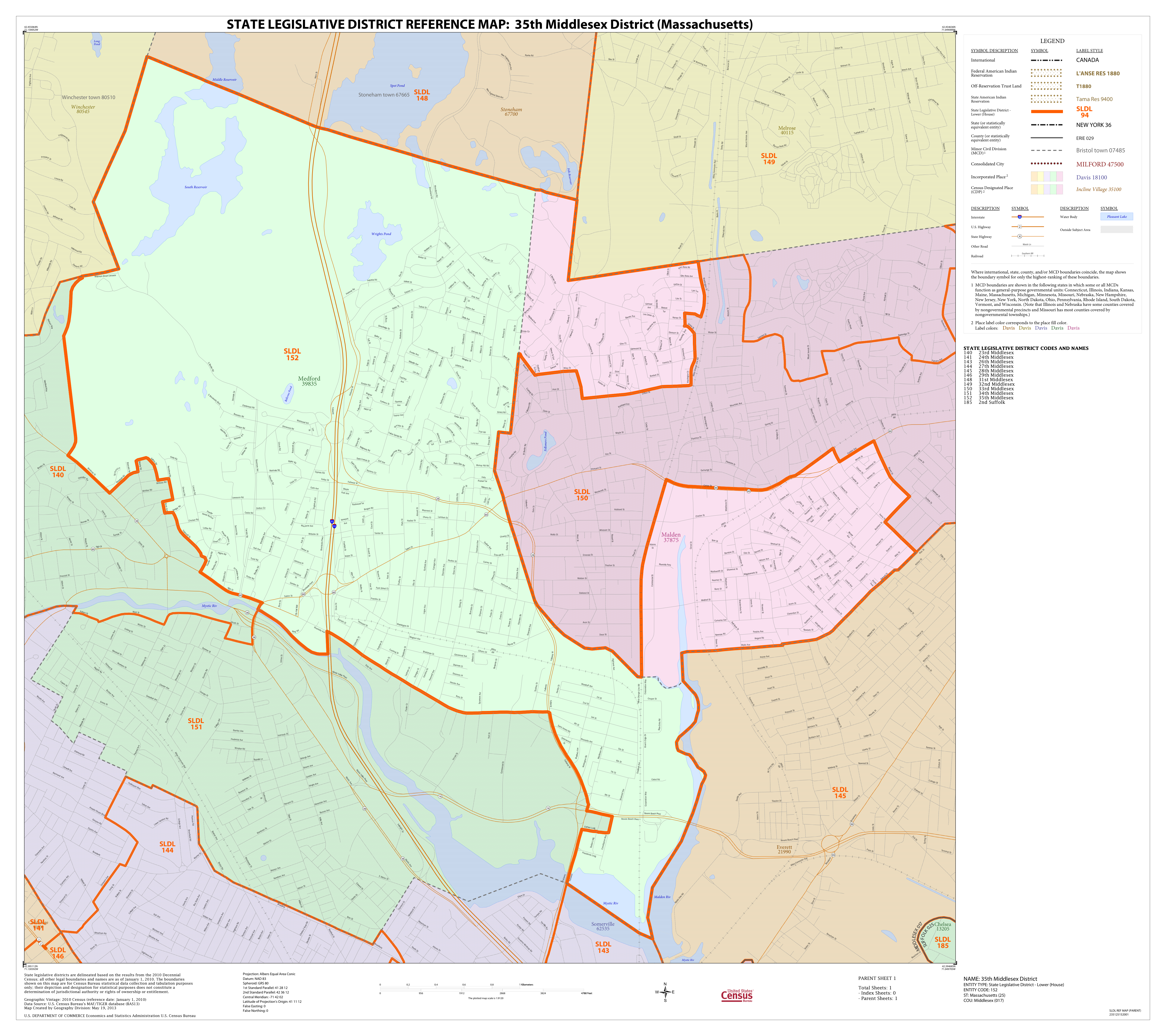
Map of Massachusetts House of Representatives' 35th Middlesex district, based on the 2010 United States census.

Massachusetts House of Representatives' 35th Middlesex district in the United States is one of 160 legislative districts included in the lower house of the Massachusetts General Court. It covers parts of the cities of Malden and Medford in Middlesex County. Since 2003, Paul Donato of the Democratic Party has represented the district. Candidates running for this district seat in the 2020 Massachusetts general election include Nichole Mossalam.

The current district geographic boundary overlaps with those of the Massachusetts Senate's 2nd Middlesex and 5th Middlesex districts.

== Representatives ==
- George W. Shattuck, circa 1973
- Lincoln P. Cole Jr., 1975–1978
- Sherman W. Saltmarsh Jr.
- William G. Robinson
- Timothy F. O'Leary
- Patrick C. Guerriero
- Michael E. Festa
- Paul J. Donato Sr., 2003–current

== See also ==
- List of Massachusetts House of Representatives elections
- List of Massachusetts General Courts
- Other Middlesex County districts of the Massachusetts House of Representatives: 1st, 2nd, 3rd, 4th, 5th, 6th, 7th, 8th, 9th, 10th, 11th, 12th, 13th, 14th, 15th, 16th, 17th, 18th, 19th, 20th, 21st, 22nd, 23rd, 24th, 25th, 26th, 27th, 28th, 29th, 30th, 31st, 32nd, 33rd, 34th, 36th, 37th
- List of former districts of the Massachusetts House of Representatives

== Images ==
Portraits of legislators

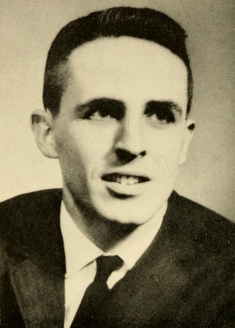
Chandler Stevens

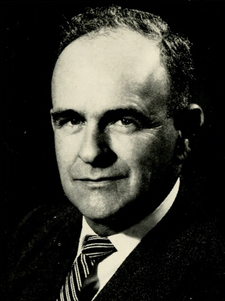
Lincoln Cole

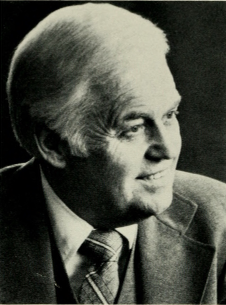
William George Robinson

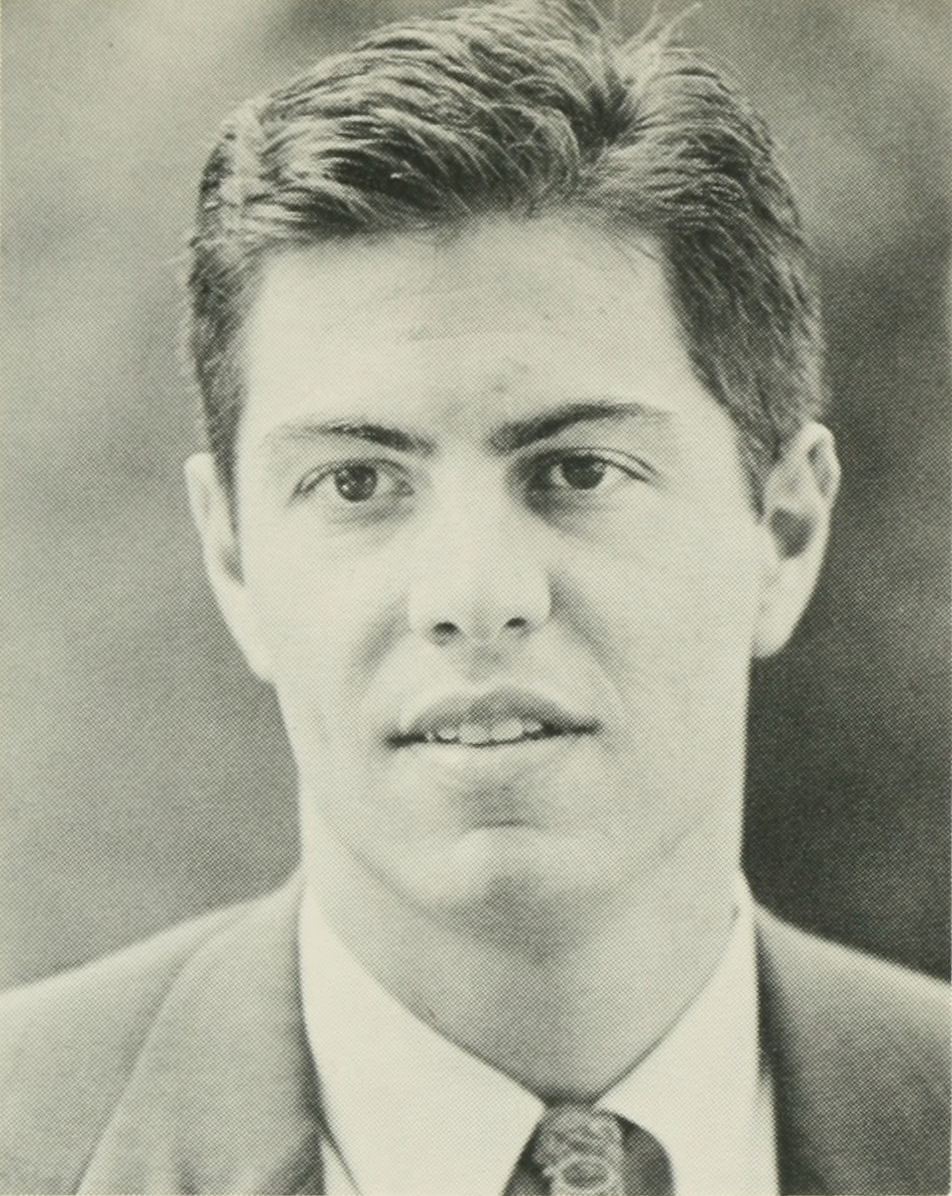
Patrick Guerriero

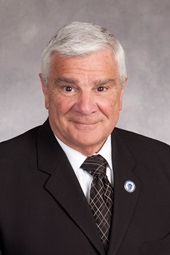
Paul Donato
