= Charles S. Baxter =

American politician

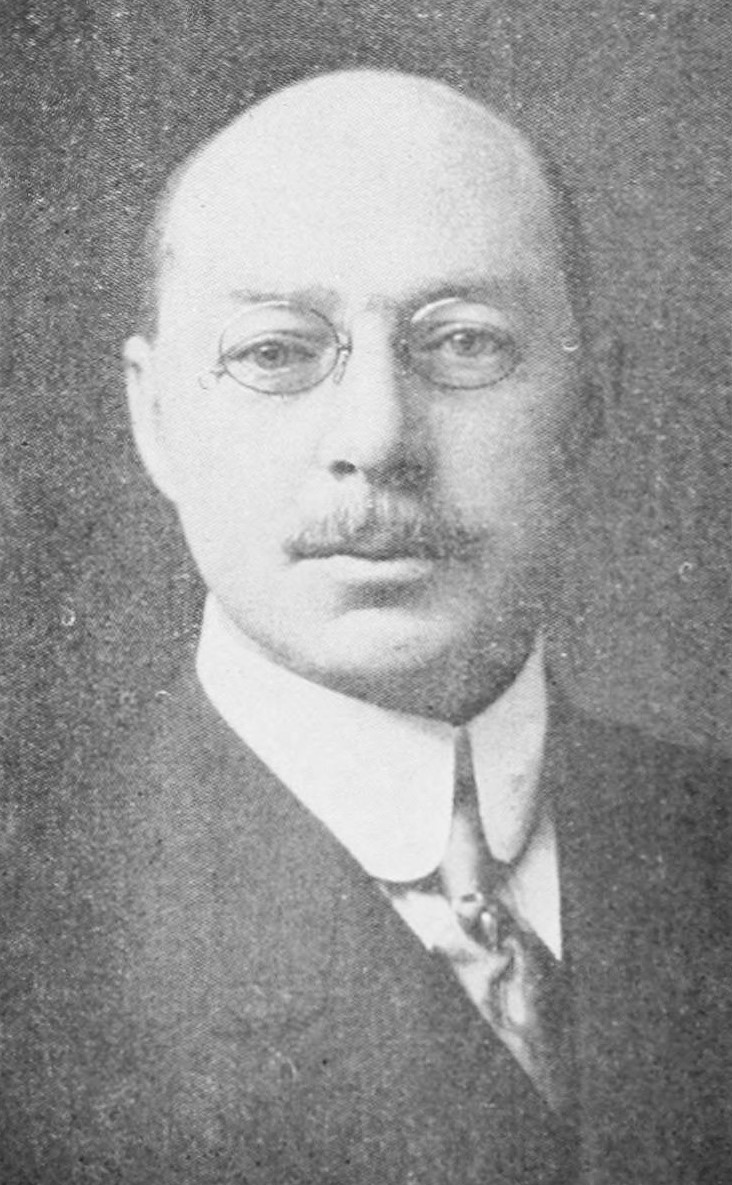

4th Mayor of Medford, Massachusetts
- In office 1900–1904
- Preceded by: Lewis H. Lovering
- Succeeded by: Michael F. Dwyer

Personal details
- Born: August 27, 1866 Boston, Massachusetts, U.S.
- Died: January 18, 1927 (aged 60) Miami, Florida, U.S.
- Party: Republican
- Education: Harvard College

Charles Sidney Baxter (August 27, 1866 – January 18, 1927) was an American politician who served as mayor of Medford, Massachusetts.

== Early life ==
Baxter was born on August 27, 1866, in Boston. He graduated from The English High School in 1883 and went to work as a stenographer for the Metropolitan Street Railway. He later returned to school and graduated from Harvard College in 1892.

== Legal career ==
Baxter served as an attorney for the West End Street Railway and later for the Boston Elevated Railway. He also served as an attorney for the Grand Trunk Railway during its effort to enter Boston. In 1915 he was nominated for the position of Medford city solicitor, but he was not confirmed by the city council.

== Political career ==
Baxter served as Mayor of Medford from 1900 to 1904. In 1911, Baxter served as campaign manager for Louis A. Frothingham's gubernatorial campaign. Frothingham defeated John N. Cole and Robert Luce for the Republican nomination, but lost to Eugene Foss in the general election. In 1915 he managed Samuel W. McCall's victory over incumbent David I. Walsh in the gubernatorial election. Baxter served as an advisor to McCall and was referred to as "the man behind" the Governor. In 1921, Baxter ran for Mayor of Boston. He finished in fourth place with 2.6% of the vote.

== Personal life ==
A lifelong bachelor, Baxter resided in Boston with his sister at the Brunswick Hotel and later the Fensgate Hotel. He died on January 18, 1927, in Miami, Florida, where he was visiting another sister.
