= Charles S. O'Connor =

American politician (1879–1948)

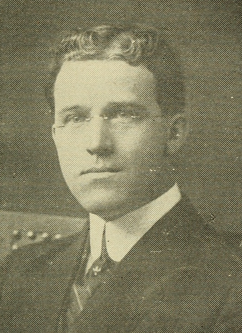
- portrait photograph, circa 1918

Clerk of the Massachusetts Supreme Judicial Court
- In office 1934–1948
- Preceded by: Joseph P. Riley
- Succeeded by: Frederick L. Quinlan

Member of the Massachusetts House of Representatives from the 10th Suffolk district
- In office 1917–1918
- Preceded by: Samuel Davis
- Succeeded by: Robert E. Bigney

Member of the Boston School Committee
- In office 1919–1923

Personal details
- Born: March 1, 1879 Boston, Massachusetts, U.S.
- Died: July 31, 1948 (aged 69) Boston, Massachusetts, U.S.
- Resting place: New Calvary Cemetery; Boston, Massachusetts, U.S.
- Party: Democratic
- Education: Suffolk University Law School
- Occupation: Lawyer

Charles S. O'Connor (March 1, 1879 – July 31, 1948) was an American politician who was clerk of the Massachusetts Supreme Judicial Court and a member of the Massachusetts House of Representatives and the Boston School Committee. He was a candidate for mayor of Boston in 1921.

== Early life ==
O'Connor was born on March 1, 1879, in Boston. He was one of seven children born to Patrick and Catherine O’Connor. One of his brothers, Patrick H. O'Connor, was also a member of the Massachusetts General Court. He attended Boston College, but left to help support his family following his father's death. He worked in the counting and editorial rooms of The Boston Journal until 1899, when he went to work for the city of Boston. He started out as a rodman in the street department and from 1910 to 1916 he was a city health inspector.

== Legal career ==
While working in the health department, O’Connor attended Suffolk University Law School at night. He graduated in 1913, passed the bar in 1915, and opened a law office in 1917. O'Connor represented Eugene R. Drioly, a convicted murderer who was seeking a pardon, pro bono. Drioly was pardoned on parole conditions on January 4, 1933.

== Political career ==
portrait photograph of O'Connor, circa 1921

From 1917 to 1918, O’Connor represented the 10th Suffolk district in the Massachusetts House of Representatives. In 1919 he was elected to the Boston School Committee. He finished a distant third behind James Michael Curley and John R. Murphy in the 1921 Boston mayoral election. O’Connor chose not run for a second term on the school committee in 1923, instead focusing on his law practice.

O’Connor ran for clerk of the Massachusetts Supreme Judicial Court in 1928, but lost by a few hundred votes. He was elected in 1934 and reelected in 1940 and 1946. He remained in office until his death on July 31, 1948.
