= John J. Lawn =

American politician and businessman

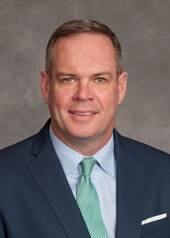

Member of the Massachusetts House of Representatives from the 10th Middlesex District
- Incumbent
- Assumed office May 11, 2011
- Preceded by: Peter Koutoujian

Personal details
- Party: Democratic
- Education: Merrimack College (BA)

John J. Lawn is an American politician and businessman, currently serving as a member of the Massachusetts House of Representatives. He is a member of the Democratic Party.

== Early life ==
John J. Lawn Jr. was born and raised in Watertown, Massachusetts. He attended St. Patrick's School and Watertown High School before graduating from Merrimack College in 1991.

== Education ==
Lawn earned a Bachelor of Arts degree in political science and sociology from Merrimack College.

== Political career ==
Lawn has served on the Watertown Town Council since 2006. He was elected to the Massachusetts House of Representatives in 2011, representing the 10th Middlesex District, which includes parts of Newton, Watertown, and Waltham. He serves as House Chair of the Joint Committee on Health Care Financing.

After the incumbent representative Peter Koutoujian resigned from the Massachusetts House to serve as Middlesex County sheriff, Lawn won the May 11, 2011, special election to replace him. Lawn had previously been a member of the Watertown City Council and owned a real estate business.

In October 2019, Lawn endorsed Joe Biden in the 2020 Democratic Party presidential primaries.

== Recent legislation ==
- In May 2026, Lawn filed House Bill H.1829, which would eliminate the statute of limitations for civil child sexual abuse claims in Massachusetts. In November 2025, Lawn was the lead sponsor of a bill, passed unanimously by the Massachusetts House, to strengthen legal protections for health care workers, including new incident-reporting and interagency coordination requirements aimed at reducing workplace violence in health care settings.
- In September 2025, Lawn praised passage of a supplemental state budget bill directing $122 million to acute care hospitals serving high proportions of low-income patients, $77 million to the Health Safety Net Trust Fund, and an additional $35 million to community health centers.
- Lawn has also worked with the Watertown city government on a Home Rule Petition to give the city more flexibility in shifting property tax burden from residential to commercial and industrial properties. The bill passed the House unanimously on July 8, 2026.

== Awards ==
- Rob Restuccia Leadership Award, Health Care for All, presented at its annual "For the People" reception, June 2024
- Legislator of the Year, the Arc of Massachusetts and the Massachusetts Developmental Disabilities Council, presented March 6, 2024, at the Massachusetts State House
- Legislator of the Year, MassBio (Massachusetts Biotechnology Council), presented at its Policy Leadership Breakfast, January 2024.
- Legislative Champion Award, Massachusetts Commission on the Status of Persons with Disabilities, presented at its National Disability Employment Awareness Month celebration, November 2024
- Legislator of the Year, Massachusetts Chapter of the National Academy of Elder Law Attorneys (MassNAELA), presented at its annual meeting, December 12, 2024
- Champion of Youth Award, Massachusetts Alliance of Boys & Girls Clubs, presented March 26, 2025, at its Annual Legislative Luncheon and Advocacy Day
- Community Health Center Champion, Massachusetts League of Community Health Centers
- Community Partner recognition, St. Mary of Carmen Society, the Nonantum Children's Christmas Party Association, and the Nonantum Neighborhood Association

== Personal life ==
Lawn and his wife raised five children in Watertown. His wife and daughter both work as nurses in the Boston area, continuing a family history in health care, as his mother emigrated from Ireland in the early 1960s to the U.S. through a nursing work-exchange program.

In May 2026, Lawn publicly disclosed in an op-ed for The Boston Globe that he was sexually abused as a child by an adult supervisor at a local recreational facility and by a Catholic priest, both since deceased. In the piece, he called for eliminating the statute of limitations in Massachusetts civil child sexual abuse cases.

In July 2025, Lawn was arrested near the Massachusetts State House after colliding with a parked pickup truck and running two stop signs. He pleaded guilty to operating under the influence and leaving the scene of a crash that caused property damage. He was sentenced to a 45-day loss of license, and a year of probation.

== See also ==
- 2019–2020 Massachusetts legislature
- 2021–2022 Massachusetts legislature
