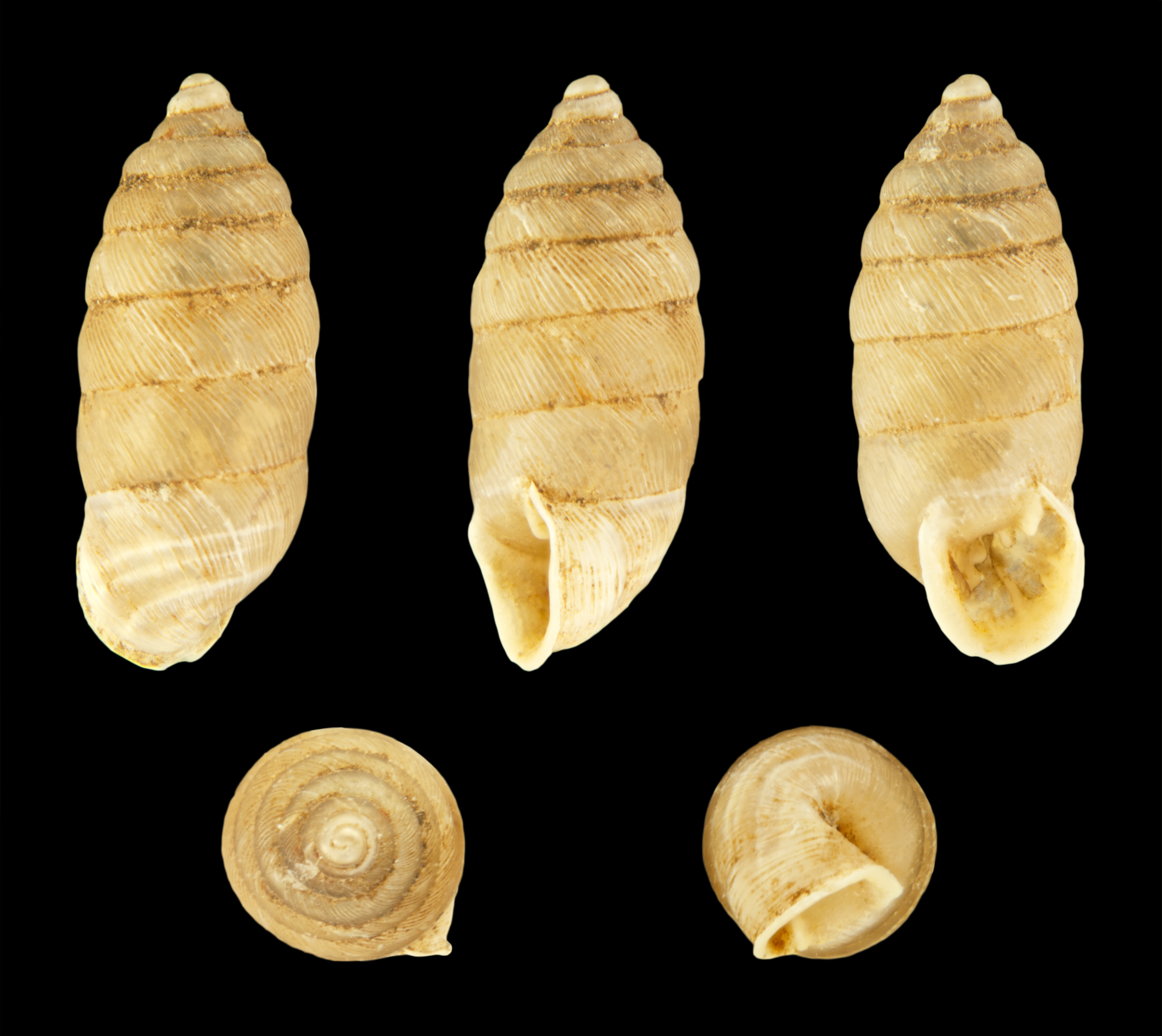
- Shell of Granaria frumentum (normal form)

Scientific classification
- Kingdom: Animalia
- Phylum: Mollusca
- Class: Gastropoda
- Order: Stylommatophora
- Family: Chondrinidae
- Genus: Granaria
- Species: G. frumentum

Binomial name
- Granaria frumentum (Draparnaud, 1801)

= Granaria frumentum =

Species of gastropod

Granaria frumentum is a species of air-breathing land snail, a terrestrial pulmonate gastropod mollusk in the family Chondrinidae.

Granaria frumentum is the type species of genus Granaria.

== Distribution ==
Distribution of this species is central-European and southern-European.

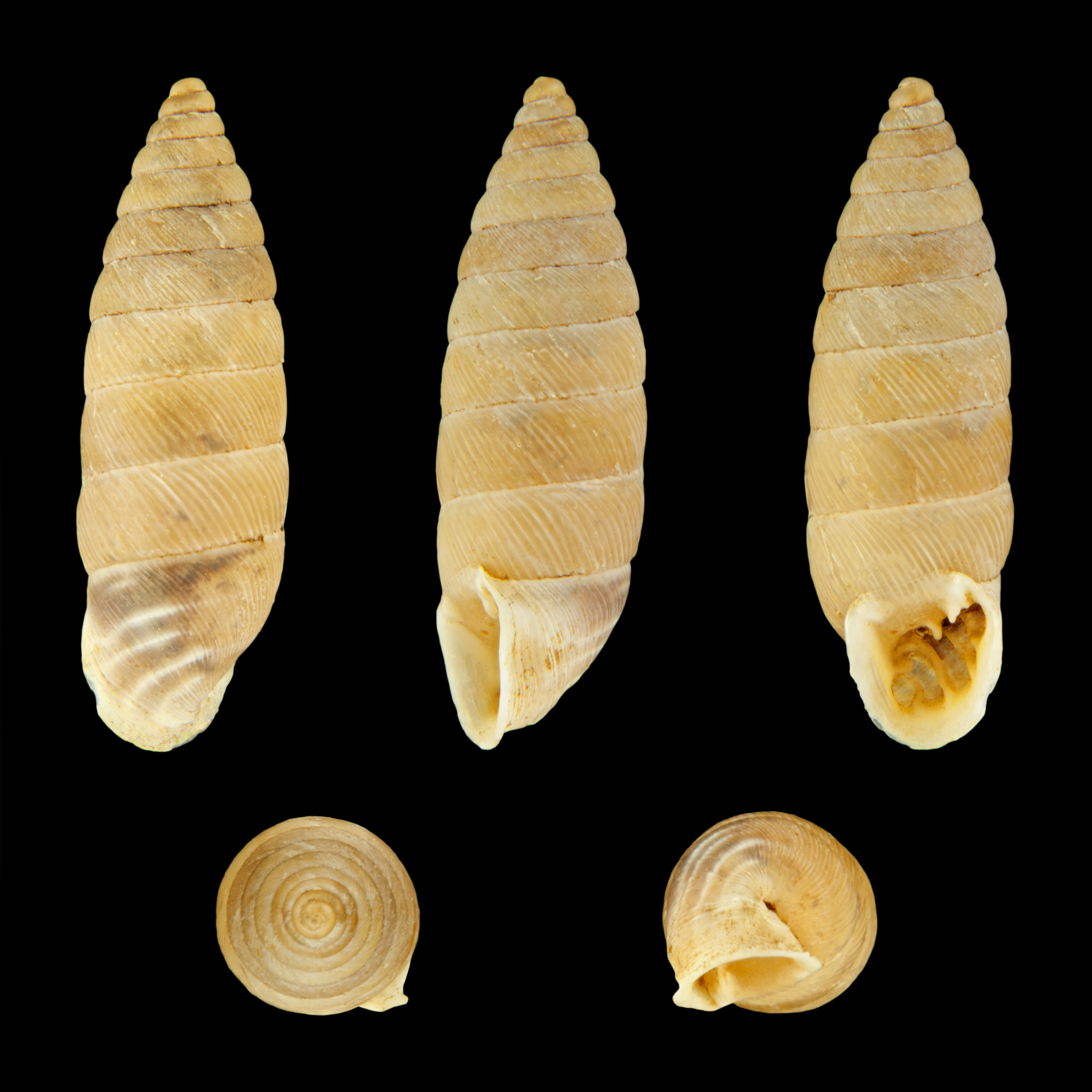
Large form (1,2 cm)

- Czech Republic - near threatened (NT)
- Poland - critically endangered (CR)
- Slovakia
- Ukraine
- and others
