= Marilyn Porreca =

American politician

29th Mayor of Medford, Massachusetts
- In office 1986–1988
- Preceded by: Paul Donato
- Succeeded by: Michael J. McGlynn

Personal details
- Born: April 21, 1932
- Died: February 4, 2008 (aged 75) Weymouth, Massachusetts
- Resting place: Couch Memorial Cemetery; Marshfield, Massachusetts
- Party: Democratic
- Spouse: Gino F. Porreca
- Education: Boston University
- Occupation: Hospital Administrator

Marilyn Ann Catino Porreca (April 21, 1932 – February 4, 2008) was an American politician who served as the 29th mayor of Medford, Massachusetts from 1986 to 1988. She was Medford's first female mayor and the final Mayor under the Plan E form of government in which the Mayor was chosen by the City Council.

== Political career ==
In 1973, Porreca became the first woman elected to the Medford City Council.

In 1984, she ran for the 37th Middlesex District seat in the Massachusetts House of Representatives. She lost to the incumbent Michael J. McGlynn, 4,886 votes to 2,164, in the Democratic primary.

In 1986, she was chosen by the City Council to become Mayor of Medford. After Medford's Plan E government was abolished, Porreca was a candidate for Mayor under the new form of government. She lost her mayoral bid to State Representative Michael J. McGlynn.

After her defeat, Porreca left Medford and retired to Marshfield, Massachusetts.

Outside politics Porreca worked as the secretary to Mayors Frederick Dello Russo and James Kurker and as a hospital administrator at Middlesex County Hospital.

== Personal life ==
Porreca attended Boston University where she received a BS degree in business administration.

She was the daughter of Michael Catino, who served 18 years as a State Representative. She and her husband, Gino, had six children: Nanci, Michael, Brian, Ronald, Cathryn, and Andrea. She was second cousins with Michael J. McGlynn.

She died in 2008, in Weymouth, Massachusetts.
