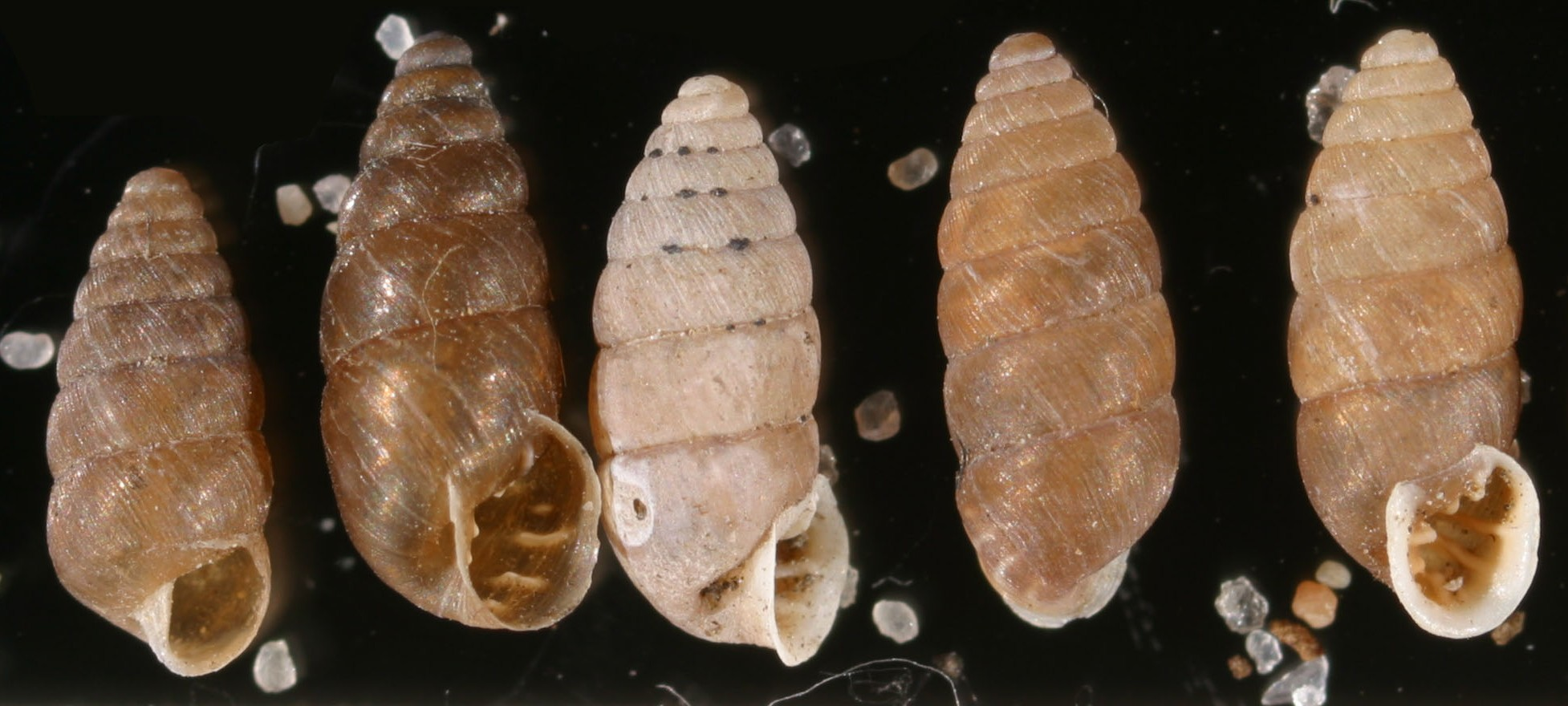
- Shells of Granaria frumentum

Scientific classification
- Domain: Eukaryota
- Kingdom: Animalia
- Phylum: Mollusca
- Class: Gastropoda
- Order: Stylommatophora
- Family: Chondrinidae
- Subfamily: Granariinae
- Genus: Granaria; Held, 1838

Type species
- Pupa frumentum Draparnaud, 1801

Synonyms
- Pupella Swainson, 1840

= Granaria =

Genus of gastropods

Granaria is a genus of air-breathing land snail, a terrestrial pulmonate gastropod mollusc in the subfamily Granariinae of the family Chondrinidae.

== Species ==
Species within the genus Granaria include:

- Granaria arabica (Dohrn, 1860)
- † Granaria costata (Lueger, 1981)
- Granaria crassiventer Salvador, Höltke, Rasser & Kadolsky, 2016 †
- Granaria frumentum (Draparnaud, 1801)
- † Granaria fustis (O. Boettger, 1889)
- † Granaria grossecostata (Gottschick & Wenz, 1919)
- † Granaria helicidarum (Jooss, 1924)
- † Granaria intrusa (Slavík, 1869)
- Granaria lapidaria (Hutton, 1849)
- † Granaria moedlingensis Harzhauser & H. Binder, 2004
- † Granaria multicostulata (Gutzwiller, 1905)
- † Granaria oryza (F. E. Edwards, 1852)
- Granaria persica Gittenberger, 1973
- † Granaria schlosseri (Cossmann, 1908)
- † Granaria schuebleri (Klein, 1846)
- Granaria stabilei (Martens, 1865)
- † Granaria subvariabilis (Sandberger, 1858)
- Granaria variabilis (Draparnaud, 1801)

Species brought into synonymy

- Granaria antiqua (Zieten, 1832) † : synonym of Granaria schuebleri (Klein, 1846) † (junior homonym of Pupa antiqua Matheron, 1832)
- Granaria braunii (Rossmässler, 1842): synonym of Graniberia braunii (Rossmässler, 1842) (superseded generic combination)
- Granaria illyrica (Rossmässler, 1835): synonym of Granaria frumentum illyrica (Rossmässler, 1835) (unaccepted rank)
- Granaria pachygastra K. Miller, 1900 † : synonym of Granaria crassiventer Salvador, Höltke, Rasser & Kadolsky, 2016 †
