= List of mayors of Medford, Massachusetts =

This is a list of the past and present mayors of Medford, Massachusetts.

== Mayors ==
No.	Mayor	Picture	Term	Party
1	Samuel C. Lawrence		1893 – 1894	Republican
2	Baxter E. Perry		1895 – January 4, 1897	Republican
3	Lewis H. Lovering		January 4, 1897 – January 1901	Republican
4	Charles S. Baxter		January 1901 – 1904	Republican
5	Michael F. Dwyer		1905 – 1907	Democrat
6	Clifford Merton Brewer		1908 – 1910	Republican
7	Charles S. Taylor		1911 – 1914	Republican
8	Benjamin F. Haines		1915 – 1922	Republican
9	Richard B. Coolidge		1923 – 1926	Republican
10	Edward H. Larkin		1927 – 1931	Republican
11	John H. Burke		1932 – 1933	Democrat
12	John J. Irwin		1934 – 1937	Republican
13	John C. Carr		1938 – 1943	Democrat
Acting	George L. Callahan		1943 – 1944	
14	Walter E. Lawrence		1944 – 1949	Republican
15	Frederick T. McDermott		1950 – 1951	
16	John C. Carr Jr.		1952 – 1954	
17	Arthur DelloRusso		1955	
18	Alfred P. Pompeo		1956 – 1957	
19	John C. Carr Jr.		1958 – 1961	
20	John J. McGlynn		1962 – 1967	
21	Patrick J. Skerry		1968 – 1969	
22	John J. McGlynn		1970 – 1971	
23	Angelo Marotta		1972 – 1973	
24	Frederick Dello Russo		1974	
25	James K. Kurker		1975	
26	John J. McGlynn		1976 – 1977	
27	Eugene F. Grant		1978 – 1979	
28	Paul Donato		1980 – 1985	Democrat
29	Marilyn Porreca		1986 – 1987	Democrat
30	Michael J. McGlynn		1988 – 2016	Democrat
31	Stephanie Muccini Burke		2016 – 2020	
32	Breanna Lungo-Koehn		2020 – Present	

== City managers ==
From 1950 to 1988, an appointed city manager served as the chief administrative manager of the city.

No.	City Manager	Term
1	James Shurtleff	1950– 1956
2	John B. Kennedy	1957– 1958
3	Edward J. Conroy	1958– 1960
4	John C. Carr	1961– 1962
5	Howard Reed	1962– 1970
6	James O. Nicholson	1970– 1980
7	Carroll Sheehan	1980– 1982
8	John Ghiloni	1982– 1985
9	Richard Lee	1985– 1988
