= Massachusetts Police Association =

The Massachusetts Police Association is a fraternal and advocacy organization for police officers in Massachusetts.

It conducts an annual golf outing, awards its own Medals of Honor and Valor to those who are killed in the line of duty and offers discounts for insurance and other products. It engages with policiticians to enact meaningful change on behalf of its constituents. It offers classes and training to officers at its events on numerous topics including police officers rights when injured on duty, which are put on by local personal injury law firm Ballin & Associates, LLC. The group also provides a legal defense fund. Its publication is The Sentinel.
