= Angelo Marotta =

American politician

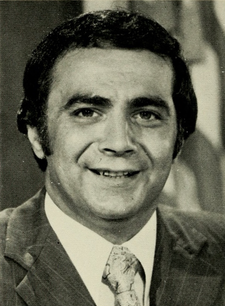
- Angelo Marotta

Member of the Massachusetts House of Representatives
- In office 1975–1989
- Succeeded by: Anthony P. Giglio

Mayor of Medford, Massachusetts
- In office 1972–1973
- Preceded by: John J. McGlynn
- Succeeded by: Frederick Dello Russo

Personal details
- Born: October 16, 1937 (age 88) Boston
- Party: Democratic
- Education: Seton Hall University
- Occupation: Real estate developer Politician

Angelo Marotta (born October 16, 1937) is an American politician who served as a member of the Medford, Massachusetts, city council and the Massachusetts House of Representatives.

== Early life ==
Marotta was born in Boston. He attended Medford High School, Mercersburg Academy, and Seton Hall University.

== Political career ==
Marotta began his political career as a member of the Medford city council from 1972 to 1973 he also served as the city's mayor, which also gave him a seat on the Medford school committee.

From 1975 to 1989, Marotta was a member of the Massachusetts House of Representatives. In 1984, Marotta served as the assistant majority leader.

== Business career ==
While serving the House, Marotta worked in real estate and was described as "the most successful condominium developer in [Medford]". By 1987 he had constructed or planned nearly 1,200 condominiums. He specialized in developing, constructing, selling and, occasionally, mortgaging high-rise buildings, mostly in Medford.

== Campaign funding conviction ==
During the 1990 gubernatorial election, Marotta exceeded the maximum amount an individual could contribute to a political campaign in Massachusetts by purchasing $22,000 in money orders under the names of friends and associates. According to a federal prosecutor, Marotta admitted that he hid the donations because the candidate, John Silber, who at the time was expected to win the governor's race, might give him a job. Marotta pled guilty and agreed to six months of house arrest and $35,000 in state and federal fines.
