= Fannie M. Buzzell =

American politician

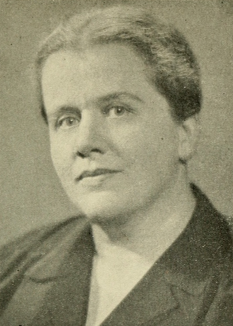

Member of the Massachusetts House of Representatives from the 10th Middlesex district
- In office 1945–1948

Personal details
- Party: Republican
- Spouse: Joseph E. Dettling (m. 1947)
- Occupation: Politician

Fannie M. Buzzell was an American politician who served in the Massachusetts House of Representatives from 1945 to 1948, representing the 10th Middlesex district of Massachusetts as a Republican.

== Career ==
Buzzell served in the Massachusetts House of Representatives from 1945 to 1948, representing the 10th Middlesex district of Massachusetts as a Republican in the 1945–1946 Massachusetts legislature and the 1947–1948 Massachusetts legislature.

== Personal life ==
Buzzell married Joseph E. Dettling on December 23, 1947. She resided in Hudson, Massachusetts.

== See also ==
- 1945–1946 Massachusetts legislature
- 1947–1948 Massachusetts legislature

Massachusetts House of Representatives
Preceded by —	Member of the Massachusetts House of Representatives from the 10th Middlesex district 1945–1948	Succeeded by —
