= 5th Massachusetts Militia Regiment =

5th Regiment Massachusetts Volunteer Militia
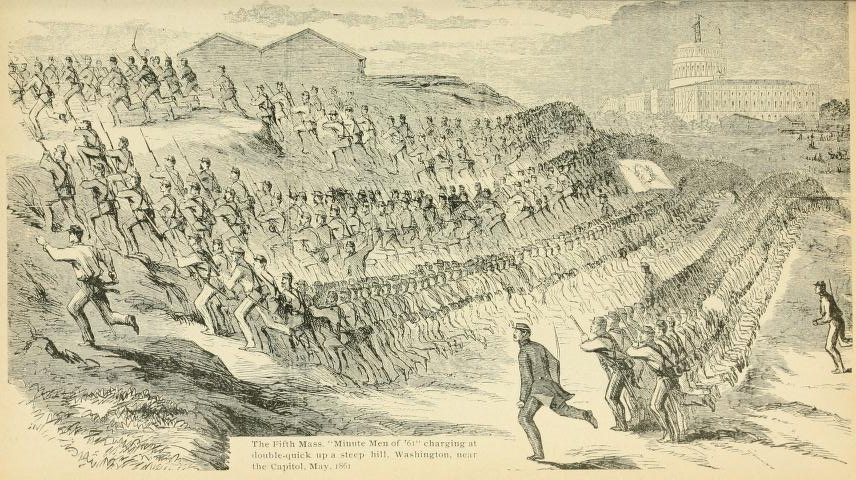
- The 5th Massachusetts charges up a hill in Washington D.C. during training, May 1861. The U.S. Capitol is shown in the background.
- Active: April 21, 1861 – July 29, 1861; September 16, 1862 – July 2, 1863 and July 16, 1864 – November 16, 1864
- Country: United States of America
- Allegiance: Union
- Branch: Union Army
- Type: Infantry
- Part of: In 1863: 1st Brigade, 1st Division, XVIII Corps

Commanders
- Notable commanders: Colonel Samuel C. Lawrence; Colonel George H. Peirson

Insignia
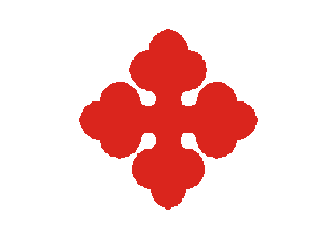
- XVIII Corps, 1st Division badge

The 5th Regiment Massachusetts Volunteer Militia was a peacetime infantry regiment that was activated for federal service in the Union army for three separate tours during the American Civil War. In the years immediately preceding the war and during its first term of service, the regiment consisted primarily of companies from Essex County as well as Boston and Charlestown.

The regiment first served a 90-day term of service from April to July 1861. Near the end of this first enlistment, the 5th Massachusetts was heavily engaged in the First Battle of Bull Run. Their second term of service lasted 9 months from September 1862 to July 1863 during which they were stationed in New Bern, North Carolina, participated in several expeditions and saw minor combat including the Battle of Goldsborough Bridge. Their third enlistment in response to the emergency call for troops to defend Washington, D.C. lasted 100 days from July to November 1864 during which they were stationed in various fortifications around Baltimore, Maryland, primarily in Fort McHenry.

== Earlier units ==
Other units dating back to the 18th century were given the designation 5th Regiment Massachusetts Militia. They were formed and disbanded repeatedly over more than a century prior to the Civil War. These included a regiment that served during King George's War in the siege of Louisbourg in 1745. During the Revolutionary War, the 5th Massachusetts Regiment saw action at the Battle of Bunker Hill, New York Campaign, Battle of Trenton, Battle of Princeton and Battle of Saratoga. The 5th Massachusetts that saw service during the Civil War was formed during the reorganization of the Massachusetts militia in 1855. At that time of its formation, the regiment was commanded by Colonel Charles B. Rogers. By the start of the Civil War in 1861, Samuel C. Lawrence commanded the unit and led it during its first term of service.

== 1861 term of service ==
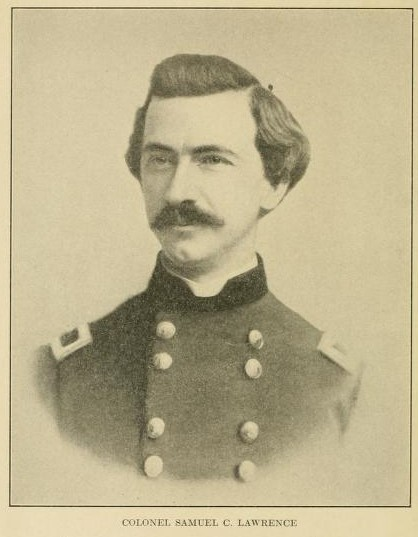
Colonel Samuel C. Lawrence, commanding officer of the 5th Massachusetts Militia in 1861

On April 15, when President Lincoln called for 75,000 troops in response to the attack on Fort Sumter, the 5th Massachusetts was ordered by Massachusetts Governor John A. Andrew to prepare for active service in the field. Andrew dispatched four regiments on April 17 and 18, holding the 5th Massachusetts in reserve for the time being. On April 19, pro-secessionist rioters in Baltimore attacked the 6th Massachusetts as that regiment attempted to make their way to Washington. Alarmed by the escalation in violence, Andrew summoned the 5th Massachusetts to Boston to prepare for departure. The first companies arrived in Boston that same day on April 19. By April 20 the remaining companies reported and the regiment was prepared to depart. That night, the unit barracked in Faneuil Hall and departed for Virginia on April 21, 1861.

The regiment spent their first month of service drilling in Washington D.C. During this time they were barracked in the U.S. Treasury Building. On May 25, they marched to Alexandria, Virginia where they set up camp and remained for a month and a half. During this time, President Lincoln and his cabinet reviewed the regiment and dubbed them the "Steady Fifth" due to their performance during the review. While encamped in Alexandria, the unit received new uniforms consisting of dark blue coats and trousers—the Regular Army uniform of the time. The 5th Massachusetts was one of very few volunteer units to take the field in Regular Army uniforms and were frequently mistaken for Regular troops during the Bull Run campaign. On July 13, the 5th Massachusetts received orders to march for Centreville, Virginia.

On July 21, 1861, just days before the end of their 90-day term of service, the 5th Massachusetts took part in the First Battle of Bull Run, the first major engagement of Civil War. Before their departure from Alexandria, Major General Irvin McDowell, commanding the Union Army of Northeastern Virginia, addressed the 5th Massachusetts and, in light of their term of service being nearly at an end, offered them the option of foregoing the campaign. The 5th Massachusetts voted unanimously to go with McDowell's army. Assigned to the First Brigade (Franklin's), Third Division (Heintzelman's) of the Army of Northeastern Virginia, the 5th Massachusetts was among those units sent to probe the Confederate right flank on July 18 resulting in the Battle of Blackburn's Ford. When this maneuver failed, McDowell opted to send a large portion of his forces on a wide flanking maneuver across Sudley Springs Ford, hoping to get around the Confederate left flank. On July 21, precisely three months after they departed Boston, the 5th Massachusetts crossed Sudley Springs Ford and participated in pitched combat on Henry House Hill.

The regiment advanced more than a mile from Sudley Springs Ford to Henry House Hill at the double-quick in full gear. This rapid pace executed with heavy knapsacks was a challenge for the inexperienced regiment. When they reached the foot of the hill, General Heintzelman led the 5th Massachusetts, the 11th Massachusetts and Ricketts's Battery up the slope in an effort to retake several Union batteries and turn the Confederate right flank. Confederate artillery stopped their advance and the 5th Massachusetts was ordered to lay prone on the slope of the hill under direct artillery fire. Color Sergeant W. H. Lawrence stood during this time and was killed by artillery fire. Colonel Lawrence, who also remained standing at the center of his regiment, was among the wounded and carried from the field. When Confederate General Thomas "Stonewall" Jackson led a counterattack, the 5th Massachusetts retreated in disorder from Henry House Hill with the rest of the Union Army. The unit suffered casualties of 9 killed and 11 wounded and 22 prisoners.

The 5th Massachusetts embarked for Boston less than a week after the Union army's retreat back to Washington. They were mustered out on July 30, 1861.

== 1862-1863 term of service ==
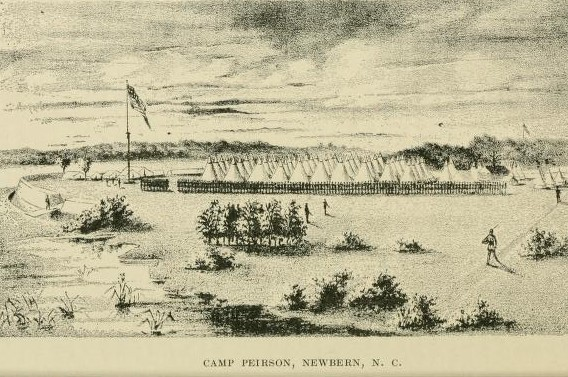
The 5th Massachusetts at Camp Peirson, New Bern, North Carolina, 1863

The regiment was again activated for federal service following Lincoln's call in August 1862 for 300,000 troops to serve for nine months. Five of the original companies (half the regiment) returned for the second tour. The other five companies were newly recruited. The unit was mustered in at Camp Lander in Wenham, Massachusetts beginning September 16, 1862. The regiment departed Massachusetts on October 22, assigned to Major General John G. Foster's Department of North Carolina, later designated as the XVIII Corps. Colonel George H. Peirson of Salem, Massachusetts commanded the regiment during its second term of service.

The 5th Massachusetts joined General Foster's command at New Bern, North Carolina at the end of October 1862. During November, they took part in an expedition to Williamston, North Carolina but met with no serious opposition from the enemy. In the fall of 1862, New Bern suffered from an outbreak of yellow fever which affected the soldiers encamped around the city. During their service in North Carolina, the 5th Massachusetts suffered no fatalities in combat but lost 16 men to disease.

In December, the regiment saw its first combat of their second enlistment during the Goldsborough Expedition. The objective of this maneuver was to disrupt the Confederate supply line along the Wilmington and Weldon Railroad by destroying the Goldsborough Bridge. Over the course of this expedition, the unit marched 180 miles and took part in the Battles of Kinston, White Hall and Goldsborough Bridge. During the latter engagement on December 15, 1862, the Goldsborough Bridge was destroyed by Union troops. On December 17, the expedition began its return march to New Bern while the 5th Massachusetts was posted to act as rear guard. In meeting these orders, they withstood heavy fire for two hours and repulsed one infantry charge. At the close of the expedition, the regiment had suffered light casualties of eight wounded.

In January 1863, the regiment received orders to fortify their camp outside of New Bern. The improved camp was named Fort Peirson in honor of their commanding officer. During the spring of 1863, the unit took part in several expeditions to reconnoiter and dislodge enemy positions along the Pamlico and Neuse Rivers. These expeditions involved only minor skirmishing.

The regiment left New Bern for Boston on June 22, 1863, arriving on June 25. On June 26, the 5th Massachusetts paraded through Boston and Charlestown accompanied by various ceremonial units and marching bands. On July 2, 1863, the unit was mustered out at Camp Lander.

== 1864 term of service ==
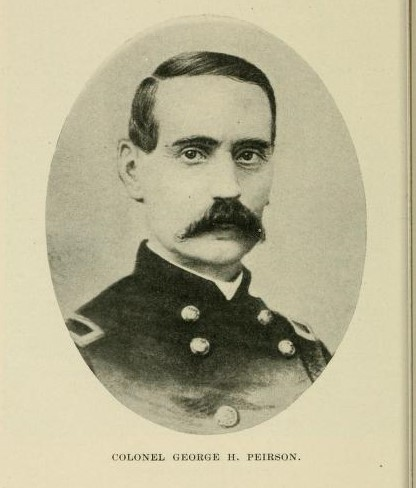
Colonel George H. Peirson commanded the 5th Massachusetts during its second and third terms of service.

In the spring of 1864, as Major General Ulysses Grant prepared to launch his Overland Campaign, he removed fresh troops from the defensive fortifications of Washington and transferred them into the field to strengthen the Army of the Potomac. Capitalizing on this reduction of manpower, Confederate General Robert E. Lee ordered Jubal Early to launch an offensive against the largely undefended capital from the Shenandoah Valley. The attack failed, however the fact that Confederate troops advanced to the outskirts of Washington D.C. caused widespread panic. This prompted Lincoln to issue a call for 500,000 troops to serve a brief term of 100 days to bolster defenses around the capital.

The 5th Massachusetts was activated for a third time in response to this call. Men began to be mustered in on July 16, 1864, at Camp Meigs just outside Boston. Colonel George H. Peirson again commanded the regiment. The roster of officers was fundamentally the same as that of the 9-months term of service as was that of the rank and file. Recruitment was rushed, new enlistments were given only most minimal training, and the regiment departed Boston on July 28, 1864, for Baltimore.

Shortly after reaching Baltimore, the 5th Massachusetts occupied Fort McHenry. Three companies were later detached to serve garrison duty at Fort Marshall. Other companies were stationed on Federal Hill. The 5th Massachusetts men who remained at Fort McHenry were present for the 50th anniversary of the famed bombardment of the fort during the Battle of Baltimore on September 13, 1814. The regimental historian noted that their duties in Baltimore were focused more on maintaining order in a city known for its secessionist views rather than external threats. During the presidential election in October 1864, detachments of the 5th Massachusetts guarded the election polls in various locations in and around Baltimore.

On November 1, 1864, the 5th Massachusetts departed Baltimore and reached Boston on November 7. They were mustered out for the final time at Camp Meigs on November 16, 1864.

== Memorials ==
Soldiers of the 5th Massachusetts who died during their second term of service with the Department of North Carolina are buried in the New Bern National Cemetery. The 5th Massachusetts is one of 17 Massachusetts regiments listed on the monument placed there by the Commonwealth of Massachusetts in 1908.

== See also ==
- List of Massachusetts Civil War units
- Massachusetts in the Civil War
