= Baxter E. Perry =

American politician

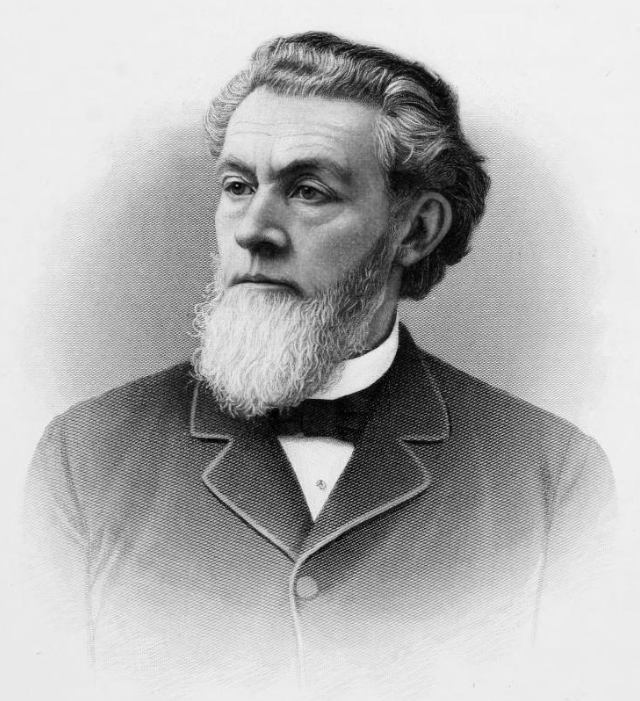

2nd Mayor of Medford, Massachusetts
- In office 1895 – January 4, 1897
- Preceded by: Samuel C. Lawrence
- Succeeded by: Lewis H. Lovering

Member of the Massachusetts House of Representatives

Personal details
- Born: April 26, 1826 Lyme, New Hampshire
- Died: August 28, 1906 (aged 80) Castine, Maine
- Party: Republican
- Spouse: Charlotte H. Hough (m. 1851)
- Education: Middlebury College
- Profession: Educator, Attorney
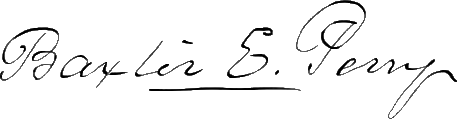
- Signature

Baxter Edwards Perry (April 26, 1826 – August 28, 1906) was a Massachusetts attorney and politician. Perry served in the Massachusetts House of Representatives and as the second Mayor of Medford, Massachusetts.

== Career as an attorney ==
Perry began the practice of law in Boston in May 1855. Perry was disbarred in 1897.

He died in Castine, Maine on August 28, 1906.

== See also ==
- 1877 Massachusetts legislature

== Notes ==
Political offices
Preceded by Samuel C. Lawrence	Mayor of Medford, Massachusetts; 1895 – January 4, 1897	Succeeded by Lewis H. Lovering
