= Eleanor Campobasso =

American politician

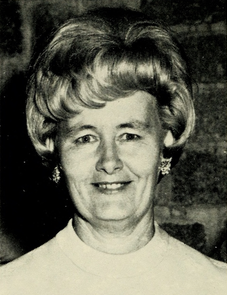
- Campobasso, circa 1975

Member of the Massachusetts House of Representatives from the 10th Middlesex district
- In office 1975–1978

Member of the Massachusetts House of Representatives from the 5th Middlesex district
- In office 1969–1974

Member of the Massachusetts House of Representatives from the 25th Middlesex district
- In office 1965–1968

Personal details
- Born: August 10, 1923 Lawrence, Massachusetts
- Died: May 23, 1998 (aged 74) Portsmouth, New Hampshire
- Party: Democratic

Eleanor M. Campobasso (née Lannon, August 10, 1923 – May 23, 1998) was an American Democratic politician from Arlington, Massachusetts. She represented the 10th Middlesex district in the Massachusetts House of Representatives from 1965 to 1978.

== Biography ==
Campobasso was born on August 10, 1923 in Lawrence, Massachusetts. Prior to becoming a state representative, Campobasso worked as a traffic supervisor for Thompson School in Arlington for eight years.

Campobasso first ran for the Massachusetts House of Representatives in 1962, but did not win election, losing by 40 votes in the primary. In 1964, she won the primary and was unopposed in the general election, becoming a representative for the 25th Middlesex district. She would later represent the 5th Middlesex district in 1968, and later was redistricted into the 10th Middlesex district in 1974. In 1978, she lost the Democratic primary to challenger John F. Cusack.

Campobasso died on May 23, 1998, at Portsmouth Regional Hospital in Portsmouth, New Hampshire. She was 74.
