= Peter Koutoujian =

American politician

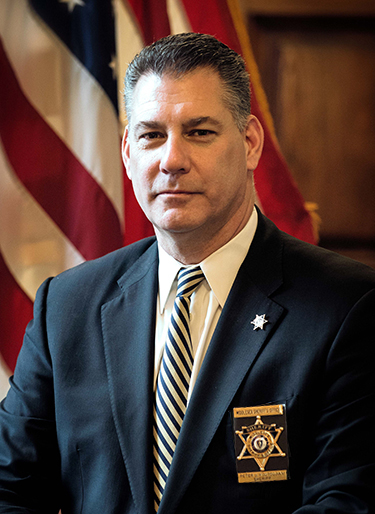

Sheriff of Middlesex County
- Incumbent
- Assumed office January 14, 2011
- Preceded by: John Granara

Member of the Massachusetts House of Representatives from the 10th Middlesex district
- In office 1997 – January 14, 2011
- Preceded by: Anthony Mandile
- Succeeded by: John J. Lawn

Personal details
- Born: Peter John Koutoujian Jr. September 17, 1961 (age 65) Newton, Massachusetts
- Party: Democratic
- Spouse: Elizabeth Cerda
- Education: Bridgewater State (BS); New England Law Boston (JD); Harvard University (MPA)
- Occupation: Sheriff; Attorney; Politician; Professor

Peter John Koutoujian (born September 17, 1961) is an American politician who is the current Sheriff of Middlesex County, Massachusetts, and a former member of the Massachusetts House of Representatives.

== Education ==
Koutoujian earned a Bachelor of Science in psychology from Bridgewater State University in 1983, a master's degree in public administration from Harvard University's Kennedy School of Government in 2003, a Juris Doctor degree from the New England School of Law in 1989.

== Massachusetts House of Representatives ==
A former Assistant District Attorney in Middlesex County, Koutoujian was elected to the Massachusetts House of Representatives in 1996. From 2001 to 2005, he was a member of Joint Committee on Health Care and was the chairman of the Committee from 2003 to 2005. From 2005 to 2009, he was the Chair of the Joint Committee on Public Health. From 2009 until his departure from the House, he was the Chair of Joint Committee on Financial Services.

== Sheriff of Middlesex County ==
On January 14, 2011, Koutoujian was appointed by Governor Deval Patrick to fill the term of Middlesex County Sheriff James DiPaola, who died on November 26, 2010.

As part of his role as Sheriff, Koutoujian opens the Harvard University commencement ceremony.

== Congressional campaign ==
Koutoujian was a candidate for the Democratic nomination in the 2013 special election for the U.S. House of Representatives. He ran to succeed Ed Markey as the U.S. representative for Massachusetts's 5th district. He finished second in the Democratic primary.

== Personal life ==
Koutoujian is of Armenian ancestry. In 2003, Koutoujian was named a Rappaport Urban Scholar by the Rappaport Institute for Greater Boston.
