= Frederick Dello Russo =

American politician and funeral director

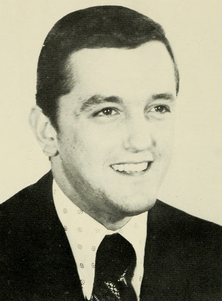

Member of the Massachusetts House of Representatives for the 20th Middlesex district
- In office 1975–1977
- Succeeded by: John Granara

Mayor of Medford, Massachusetts
- In office 1974–1974
- Preceded by: Angelo Marotta
- Succeeded by: James K. Kurker

Personal details
- Born: December 14, 1943 (age 82) Milford, Massachusetts
- Party: Democratic
- Education: New England Institute of Anatomy; Boston University (attended, but did not graduate)
- Occupation: Funeral director Politician

Frederick Dello Russo is an American politician and funeral director who served as a member of the Medford, Massachusetts city council, Mayor of Medford (a ceremonial position), and the Massachusetts House of Representatives.
