= James DiPaola =

American sheriff

- DiPaola speaking in 2010.

Sheriff of Middlesex County, Massachusetts
- In office November 27, 1996 – November 26, 2010
- Preceded by: Brad Bailey
- Succeeded by: John Granara (acting)

Member of the Massachusetts House of Representatives from the 36th Middlesex District
- In office January 1993 – November 27, 1996
- Preceded by: John C. McNeil
- Succeeded by: Christopher Fallon

Personal details
- Born: James Vincent DiPaola; May 5, 1953 Malden, Massachusetts
- Died: November 26, 2010 (aged 57) Wells, Maine
- Party: Democratic
- Children: 3

James Vincent DiPaola (May 5, 1953 – November 26, 2010) was county sheriff of Middlesex County, Massachusetts, from 1996 until his death in 2010. He had served as a Malden police officer for 18 years and was a Massachusetts state representative from 1993 to 1996. On November 26, 2010, DiPaola died by suicide. At the time of his death, he was facing multiple allegations from the state and press over ethics issues.

== Career ==
James Vincent DiPaola was born May 5, 1953, in Malden, Massachusetts, and attended Malden Catholic High School and Malden High School. After graduating he attended North Shore Community College, where he studied criminal justice, and the University of Massachusetts Boston, where he received a B.A. in political science. He was a patrolman, sergeant and undercover narcotics detective in the Malden Police Department for 18 years, and served 25 years in the United States Military Reserves. In November 1992 he was elected as a Democrat to the Massachusetts House of Representatives for the 36th Middlesex District, and he was sworn into office in January 1993. On November 27, 1996, he was sworn in as Middlesex County Sheriff after winning a special election. After serving the remainder of a partial term, he was elected to a full six-year term in November 1998 and re-elected in November 2004 and November 2010.

== Ethics charges and death ==
On November 19, 2010, DiPaola was questioned by reporters from The Boston Globe for exploiting a state pension loophole which allowed him to file for retirement, then announce a run for re-election. This would allow him to serve his third full term while collecting both a salary and pension. He maintained that it was a legal maneuver, and he had no reason to decline the opportunity: "There is nothing evil about it. I don't see it as grabbing something. I'm supposed to say no to it?" The next day, however, he phoned the Globe after a "sleepless night" and confessed his own feelings of guilt, saying, "I'd always be remembered for this, for double-dipping, that that would be my legacy." He abandoned the plan and decided not to serve the following term. The following week, DiPaola revealed that the State Ethics Commission was investigating his office over allegations that his employees were illegally raising money for his re-election. On November 27, 2010, DiPaola was found dead in a hotel in Wells, Maine, from a self-inflicted gunshot wound to the head. He had died between 5:30 pm and 7 pm the evening before.

== Personal life ==
DiPaola had a wife, Adeline, and three daughters.
