= 68th Venice International Film Festival =

Italian film festival in 2011

- Festival poster
- Opening film: The Ides of March
- Closing film: Damsels in Distress
- Location: Venice, Italy
- Founded: 1932
- Awards: Golden Lion: Faust
- Hosted by: Vittoria Puccini
- Artistic director: Marco Müller
- Festival date: 31 August – 10 September 2011
- Website: Website

Venice Film Festival chronology
- 69th 67th

The 68th annual Venice International Film Festival was held from 31 August and 10 September 2011, at Venice Lido in Italy.

American filmmaker Darren Aronofsky was the jury president for the main competition. Italian actress Vittoria Puccini was the Host of the opening and closing ceremonies. The Golden Lion was awarded to Faust by Alexander Sokurov.

Italian filmmaker Marco Bellocchio received the Golden Lion for Lifetime Achievement during the festival.

The festival opened with The Ides of March by George Clooney, and closed with Damsels in Distress by Whit Stillman.

== Juries ==
=== Main competition (Venezia 68) ===
- Darren Aronofsky, American filmmaker - Jury President
- Eija-Liisa Ahtila, Finnish visual artist and filmmaker
- David Byrne, British-American musician
- Todd Haynes, American filmmaker
- Mario Martone, Italian filmmaker
- Alba Rohrwacher, Italian actress
- André Téchiné, French filmmaker

=== Orizzonti ===
- Jia Zhangke, Chinese filmmaker - Jury President
- Stuart Comer, British Curator of Film at Tate Modern
- Odile Decq, French architect
- Marianne Khoury, Egyptian director
- Jacopo Quadri, Italian film editor

=== Controcampo Italiano ===
- Stefano Incerti, Italian author - Jury President
- Aureliano Amadei, Italian actor
- Cristiana Capotondi, Italian actress

=== Opera Prima (Venice Award for a Debut Film) ===
- Carlo Mazzacurati, Italian director - Jury President
- Aleksei Fedorchenko, Russian director
- Fred Roos, American producer
- Charles Tesson, French Artistic Director of the International Critics' Week at the Cannes Film Festival
- Serra Yilmaz, Turkish actress

== Official Sections ==
=== In Competition ===
The following films were selected for the main competition:

English title	Original title	Director(s)	Production country
4:44 Last Day on Earth		Abel Ferrara	United States, Switzerland, France
Alps	Άλπεις	Yorgos Lanthimos	Greece
A Burning Hot Summer (That Summer)	Un été brûlant	Philippe Garrel	France
Carnage		Roman Polanski	France, Germany, Spain, Poland
Chicken with Plums	Poulet aux prunes	Marjane Satrapi, Vincent Paronnaud	France, Belgium, Germany
A Dangerous Method		David Cronenberg	Canada, Germany, United Kingdom
Dark Horse		Todd Solondz	United States
The Exchange	ההתחלפות	Eran Kolirin	Israel, Germany
Faust	Фауст	Alexander Sokurov	Russia
Himizu	ヒミズ	Sion Sono	Japan
The Ides of March (opening film)		George Clooney	United States
Killer Joe		William Friedkin	United States
The Last Man on Earth	L'Ultimo Terrestre	Gipi	Italy
Life Without Principle	奪命金	Johnnie To	Hong Kong
People Mountain People Sea	人山人海	Cai Shangjun	China
Seediq Bale	賽德克·巴萊	Wei Te-sheng	Taiwan
Shame		Steve McQueen	United Kingdom
A Simple Life	桃姐	Ann Hui	Hong Kong
Terraferma		Emanuele Crialese	Italy
Texas Killing Fields		Ami Canaan Mann	United States
Tinker Tailor Soldier Spy		Tomas Alfredson	United Kingdom, France
When the Night	Quando la notte	Cristina Comencini	Italy
Wuthering Heights		Andrea Arnold	United Kingdom

=== Out of Competition ===
The following films were shown out of competition:

English title	Original title	Director(s)	Production country
Almayer's Folly	La Folie Almayer	Chantal Akerman	France, Belgium
Alois Nebel		Tomáš Luňák	Czech Republic, Germany
The Cardboard Village	Il Villaggio di Cartone	Ermanno Olmi	Italy
Contagion		Steven Soderbergh	United States
Damsels in Distress (closing film)		Whit Stillman	United States
The Disintegration	La Désintégration	Philippe Faucon	France, Belgium
Eva		Kike Maillo	Spain, France
The Field of Enchantment	La clé des champs	Claude Nuridsany, Marie Pérennou	France
Long Live the Antipodes!	Vivan las Antipodas!	Viktor Kossakovsky	Germany, Argentina, Netherlands, Chile, Russia
The Moth Diaries		Mary Harron	Canada, Ireland
Scossa		Francesco Maselli, Carlo Lizzani, Ugo Gregoretti, Nino Russo	Italy
The Sorcerer and the White Snake	白蛇傳說之法海	Ching Siu-tung	China, Hong Kong
Summer Games	Giochi d'estate	Rolando Colla	Switzerland, Italy
Tahrir 2011: The Good, the Bad, and the Politician	تحرير 2011 : الطيب والشرس والسياسي	Tamer Ezzat, Ahmad Abdalla, Ayten Amin, Amr Salama	Egypt
Tormented	ラビット・ホラー3D	Takashi Shimizu	Japan
W.E.		Madonna	United Kingdom
Wilde Salomé		Al Pacino	United States
Short films
The End		Collectif Abounaddara	Syria
Vanguard		Collectif Abounaddara	Syria
Evolution (Megaplex)		Marco Brambilla	United States
Marco Bellocchio, Venezia 2011		Pietro Marcello	Italy
La meditazione di Hayez		Mario Martone	Italy
Joule		David Zamagni, Nadia Ranocchi	Italy
Spell. The Hypnotist Dog		David Zamagni, Nadia Ranocchi	Italy
Spell. Suite		David Zamagni, Nadia Ranocchi	Italy
Special Events
Diana Vreeland: The Eye Has to Travel		Lisa Immordino Vreeland	United States
Don't Expect too Much		Susan Ray	United States
Duvidha		Mani Kaul	India
In the Name of the Father	Nel nome del padre	Marco Bellocchio	Italy
India: Matri Bhumi		Roberto Rossellini	Italy
Mildred Pierce		Todd Haynes	United States
Questa storia qua		Alessandro Paris, Sibylle Righetti	Italy
We Can't Go Home Again (1973)		Nicholas Ray	United States

=== Orizzonti ===
The following films were selected for the Horizons (Orizzonti) section:

English title	Original title	Director(s)	Production country
Main Competition
Alms of the Blind Horse	Anhe Ghore Da Daan	Gurvinder Singh	India
The Bird	L'Oiseau	Yves Caumon	France
Cut		Amir Naderi	Japan
The Flock of the Lord	Die Herde des Herrn	Romuald Karmakar	Germany
Hail		Amiel Courtin-Wilson	Australia
Hollywood Talkies		Óscar Pérez, Mia de Ribot	Spain
Hop-o'-My-Thumb	Le petit poucet	Marina de Van	France
The Invader	L'envahisseur	Nicolas Provost	Belgium
Kotoko		Shinya Tsukamoto	Japan
Love Flesh	Amore Carne	Pippo Delbono	Italy, Switzerland
Lung Neaw Visits His Neighbours		Rirkrit Tiravanija	Thailand, Mexico
Nocturnos		Edgardo Cozarinsky	Argentina
The Orator	O le tulafale	Tusi Tamasese	New Zealand, Samoa
P-047	Tae peang phu deaw	Kongdej Jaturanrasmee	Thailand
Photographic Memory		Ross McElwee	United States, France
Sal		James Franco	United States
Shock Head Soul		Simon Pummel	Netherlands, United Kingdom
Stateless Things	Jool-tak-dong-si	Kim Kyung-mook	South Korea
Summer	Verano	José Luis Torres Leiva	Chile
Swan	Cisne	Teresa Villaverde	Portugal
Swirl	Girimunho	Helvécio Marins, Jr., Clarissa Campolina	Brazil, Spain, Germany
The Sword Identity	Wokou de zongji	Xu Haofeng	China
Two Years at Sea		Ben Rivers	United Kingdom
Whores' Glory		Michael Glawogger	Austria, Germany
Would You Have Sex with an Arab?		Yolande Zauberman	France
Short Films Competition
663114		Isamu Hirabayashi	Japan
Accidentes gloriosos		Mauro Andrizzi, Marcus Lindeen	Sweden, Denmark, Argentina
All the Lines Flow Out		Charles Lim Yi Yong	Singapore
Black Mirror at the National Gallery		Mark Lewis	Canada
Conference: Notes on Film 05		Norbert Pfaffenbichler	Austria
Dialogical Abrasion	Dialogischer Abrieb	Yves Netzhammer	Switzerland
The Golden Bird	Sonchidi	Amit Dutta	India
Hypercrisis		Josef Dabernig	Austria
In attesa dell'avvento		Felice D'Agostino, Arturo Lavorato	Italy
From Tokyo	Iz Tokio	Aleksej German, Jr.	Russia
Late and Deep		Devin Horan	Norway
Louyre – This Our Still Life		Andrew Kötting	United Kingdom
Meteor		Christoph Girardet, Matthias Müller	Germany
Miss Candace Hilligoss' Flickering Halo		Fabio Scacchioloi, Vincenzo Core	Italy
Modern N° 2		Mirai Mizue	Japan
Movements of an Impossible Time	Movimenti di un tempo impossible	Flatform	Italy
Moving Stories		Nicolas Provost	Belgium
Notes sur nos voyages en Russie 1989–1990		Yervant Gianikian, Angela Ricci-Lucchi	Italy
Palaces of Pity	Palácios de pena	Gabriel Abrantes, Daniel Schmidt	Portugal
Parabeton – Pier Luigi Nervi und Römischer Beton		Heinz Emigholz	Germany
Passing Through the Night		Wattanapume Laisuwanchai	Thailand
Piattaforma Luna		Yuri Ancarani	Italy
River Rites		Ben Russell	United States
Snow Canon		Mati Diop	France
Start		Mattias Gustafsson	Sweden
The Sun's Incubator	Hadinat al shams	Ammar Al-Beik	Syria
The Tracks of My Tears 2		Axel Petersén	Sweden
Special Events
The Annunciation	Marian Ilmestys	Eija-Liisa Ahtila	Finland
Birmingham Ornament	Birmingemskiy ornament	Andrey Silvestrov, Yuri Leiderman	Russia
Century of Birthing	Siglo ng pagluluwal	Lav Diaz	Philippines
Monkey Sandwich		Wim Vandekeybus	Belgium, France
The Silence of Pelesjan	Il silenzio di Pelesjan	Pietro Marcello	Italy

=== Controcampo Italiano ===
The following films, representing "new trends in Italian cinema", were screened in this section:

In competition

English Title	Original title	Director(s)
Fiction
Easy!	Scialla!	Francesco Bruni
Maternity Blues		Fabrizio Cattani
Qualche nuvola		Saverio Di Biagio
The Arrival of Wang	L'arrivo di Wang	Manetti Bros.
Things from Another World	Cose dell'altro mondo	Francesco Patierno
Horses	Cavalli	Michele Rho
Tutta colpa della musica		Ricky Tognazzi
Feature documentaries
Black Block		Carlo Augusto Bachschmidt
Piazza Garibaldi		Davide Ferrario
Pugni chiusi		Fiorella Infascelli
Out of Tehran		Monica Maggioni
Pasta nera		Alessandro Piva
Quiproquo		Elisabetta Sgarbi
Short films
Il maestro		Maria Grazia Cucinotta
A chjàna		Jonas Carpignano
Alice		Roberto De Paolis
The Cricket		Stefano Lorenzi
Eco da luogo colpito		Carlo Michele Scririnzi
Prove per un naufragio della parola		Elisabetta Sgarbi
My Name is Sid		Giovanni Virgilio
Out of Competition
Io Sono. Storie di Schiavitù		Barbara Cupisti
Caldo grigio, caldo nero		Marco Dentici
Rudolf Jacobs, l'uomo che nacque morendo		Luigi M. Faccini
Andata e ritorno		Donatella Finocchiaro
Dai nostri inviati – La RAI racconta la Mostra del cinema 1968 – 1979		Giuseppe Gianotti, Enrico Salvatori, Davide Savelli
Pivano Blues. Sulla strada di Nanda		Teresa Marchesi
Schuberth – L'atelier della dolce vita		Antonello Sarno
Hollywood Invasion		Marco Spagnoli
Un foglio bianco		Maurizio Zaccaro

=== Italian avant-garde retrospective ===
The following films were shown as part of a retrospective section on Italian avant-garde films, titled Orizzonti 1961-1978, spanning the years 1961 to 1978.

English title	Original title	Director(s)
Anna (1975)		Alberto Grifi
Il potere (1972)		Augusto Tretti
On the Point of Death (1971)	In punto di morete	Mario Garriba
I parenti tutti (1967)		Fabio Garriba
Voce del verbo morire		Mario Garriba
Sul davanti fioriva una magnolia (1968)		Paolo Breccia
La quieta febbre (1964)		Romano Scavolini
Diario beat (1967)		Romano Scavolini
Attacco (1970)		Romano Scavolini
LSD (1970)		Romano Scavolini
Reflex (1964)		Mario Schifano
Ferreri (1967)		Mario Schifano
Souvenir (1967)		Mario Schifano
Film (1967)		Mario Schifano
Fotografo (1967)		Mario Schifano
Vietnam (1967)		Mario Schifano
Vieni dolce morte (dell'ego) (1969)		Paolo Brunatto
Bis (1966)		Paolo Brunatto
Hermitage (1967)		Carmelo Bene
Il canto d'amore di Alfred Prufrock (1967)		Nico D'Alessandria
Il respiro (1964)		Alex Rupp
The City (1961)		Alex Rupp
Zoommm, Track! (1968)		Mario Carbone
Kappa (1965-1966)		Nato Frascà
Soglie (1978)		Nato Frascà
Events of the Retrospective
Il vetturale del San Gottardo (1941)		Hans Hinrich and Ivo Illuminati
L'Accademia Musicale Chigiana (1950)		Franco Zeffirelli

== Independent Sections ==
=== Venice International Film Critics' Week ===
The following films were screened for this section:

English title	Original title	Director(s)	Production country
In competition
In The Open	El Campo	Hernán Belón	Argentina
Land of Oblivion	La Terre outragée	Michale Boganim	France, Germany, Poland, Ukraine
Là-bas: A Criminal Education	Là-bas: Educazione criminale	Guido Lombardi	Italy
Louise Wimmer		Cyril Mennegun	France
Machete Language	El Lenguaje de los Machetes	Kyzza Terrazas	Mexico
Totem		Jessica Krummacher	Germany
Wetlands	Marécages	Guy Édoin	Canada
Out of Competition
Mission Of Peace	Missione di pace	Francesco Lagi	Italy
Stockholm East	Stockholm Östra	Simon Kaijser da Silva	Sweden
Special Event in collaboration with Venice Days
You Are Here	Voi Siete Qui	Francesco Matera	Italy

=== Venice Days ===
The following films were screened as part of the Venice Days section The three nominees for the European Parliament's 2011 Lux Prize received screenings as part of this section.

English title	Original title	Director(s)	Production country
In competition
All Our Desires	Toutes nos envies	Philippe Lioret	France
Another Silence		Santiago Amigorena	France, Canada, Brazil, Argentina
Beyond the Glass (short)	Di là del vetro	Andrea di Bari	Italy
Café de Flore		Jean-Marc Vallée	Canada, France
Found Memories	Histórias que Só Existem Quando Lembradas	Júlia Murat	Brazil, France
Guilty	Présumé coupable	Vincent Garenq	France
Habibi	Habibi Rasak Kharban	Susan Youssef	Palestine, United Arab Emirates, Netherlands
Last Winter	Hiver dernier	John Shank	Belgium, France
Love and Bruises		Lou Ye	France
My Name Is Ki	Ki	Leszek Dawid	Poland
Rust	Ruggine	Daniele Gaglianone	Italy
Shun Li and the Poet	Io sono Li	Andrea Segre	Italy, France
Twilight Portrait	Portret v sumerkakh	Angelina Nikonova	Russia
Special Events
Crazy Horse		Frederick Wiseman	France, United States
Cuba in the Age of Obama	Cuba Nell'Epoca di Obama	Gianni Minà	Italy
The Kaiser of California	Der Kaiser von Kalifornien	Luis Trenker	Germany
Testimony	Edut	Shlomi Elkabetz	Israel
Open Space
La Penna di Hemingway		Renzo Carbonera	Italy
Hit the Road, Nonna		Duccio Chiarini	Italy
The Forgotten World Cup	Mundial olvidado	Lorenzo Garzella, Filippo Macelloni	Italy, Argentina
Radici		Carlo Luglio	Italy
More as an artist	Più come un artista	Elisabetta Pandimiglio	Italy
Dietro il buio		Giorgio Pressburger	Italy
Valdagno, Arizona		Pyoor	Italy, United States
Lux Prize
Attenberg		Athina Rachel Tsangari	Greece
The Snows of Kilimanjaro		Robert Guédiguian	France
Play		Ruben Östlund	Sweden

== Official Awards ==
=== In Competition (Venezia 68) ===
- Golden Lion: Faust by Alexander Sokurov
- Silver Lion for Best Director: Cai Shangjun for People Mountain People Sea
- Special Jury Prize: Terraferma by Emanuele Crialese
- Volpi Cup for Best Actor: Michael Fassbender for Shame
- Volpi Cup for Best Actress: Deanie Ip for A Simple Life
- Marcello Mastroianni Award: Shota Sometani and Fumi Nikaido for Himizu
- Golden Osella for Best Cinematography: Robbie Ryan for Wuthering Heights
- Golden Osella for Best Screenplay: Yorgos Lanthimos and Efthimis Filippou for Alps

=== Orizzonti ===
- Horizons Award: Kotoko by Shinya Tsukamoto
- Special Horizons jury prize: Whores' Glory by Michael Glawogger
- Horizons Award for medium-length film: Accidentes Gloriosos by Mauro Andrizzi and Marcus Lindeen
- Horizons Award for short film: In attesa dell'avvento by Felice D'Agostino and Arturo Lavorato
  - Special mentions:
    - O Le Tulafale by Tusi Tamasese
    - All The Lines Flow Out by Charles LIM Yi Yong

=== Controcampo Italiano ===
- Best Feature film: Scialla! by Francesco Bruni
- Best Short film: A Chjàna by Jonas Carpignano
- Best Documentary: Pugni chiusi by Fiorella Infascelli
  - Special Mentions:
  - Black Block by Carlo Augusto Bachschmidt
  - Franco Di Giacomo (cinematography) for Pugni chiusi

=== "Luigi de Laurentis" Award for a Debut Film ===
- Là-bas: A Criminal Education by Guido Lombardi

=== Golden Lion for Lifetime Achievement ===
- Marco Bellocchio

=== Glory to the Filmmaker ===
- Al Pacino

=== Special awards ===
- Jaeger-LeCoultre Glory to the Filmmaker Award: Al Pacino
- Persol 3D Award for the Most Creative Stereoscopic Film: Zapruder Filmmakers Group (David Zamagni, Nadia Ranocchi & Monaldo Moretti)
- L'Oréal Paris Award for Cinema: Nicole Grimaudo

== Independent Sections Awards ==
=== Venice International Film Critics' Week ===
- Critics' Week Audience Award: Là-bas by Guido Lombardi

=== Venice Days (Giornati degli Autori) ===
- Label Europa Cinemas Award: Guilty by Vincent Garenq
- Lina Mangiacapre Award: Shun Li and the Poet by Andrea Segre
- Laterna Magica Award: Shun Li and the Poet by Andrea Segre
- FEDIC Award: Shun Li and the Poet by Andrea Segre

== Independent Awards ==
=== FIPRESCI Award ===
- Best Film (Main competition): Shame by Steve McQueen
- Best Film (Horizons): Two Years at Sea by Ben Rivers

=== Queer Lion ===
- Wilde Salomé by Al Pacino

=== SIGNIS Award ===
- Faust by Alexander Sokurov
  - Special mention: A Simple Life by Ann Hui

=== Francesco Pasinetti Award (SNGCI) ===
- Best Film: Terraferma by Emanuele Crialese
- Best Debut (or Special mention): The Last Man on Earth by Gian Alfonso Pacinotti

=== Cicae Prize ===
- The Orator by Tusi Tamasese

=== Leoncino d'oro Agiscuola Award ===
- Carnage by Roman Polanski

=== Cinema for UNICEF Award ===
- Terraferma by Emanuele Crialese

=== C.I.C.T. UNESCO Enrico Fulchignoni Award ===
- Tahrir 2011: The Good, the Bad, and the Politician by Tamer Ezzat, Ahmad Abdalla, Ayten Amin, Amr Salama

=== Nazareno Taddei Award ===
- A Simple Life by Ann Hui

=== CinemAvvenire Award – Best Film ===
- Shame by Steve McQueen

=== Best Film – Il cerchio non è rotondo Award ===
- The Orator by Tusi Tamasese

=== Equal Opportunity Award ===
- A Simple Life by Ann Hui

=== Future Film Festival Digital Award ===
- Faust by Alexander Sokurov
  - Special mention: Kotoko by Shinya Tsukamoto

=== Gianni Astrei Award ===
- A Simple Life by Ann Hui

=== Brian Award ===
- The Ides of March by George Clooney

=== Lina Mangiacapre Award – Special mention ===
- Maternity Blues by Fabrizio Cattani

=== AIF Forfilmfest Award ===
- Easy! (Scialla!) by Francesco Bruni

=== Biografilm Lancia Award ===
- Black Block by Carlo Augusto Bachschmidt

=== Mimmo Rotella Foundation Award ===
- The Last Man on Earth by Gian Alfonso Pacinotti
  - Special mention: Pasta nera by Alessandro Piva (Controcampo Italiano)

=== Golden Mouse ===
- Killer Joe by William Friedkin

=== Premio Open ===
- Marco Müller
