= The Clearstream Affair =

- Film poster
- Directed by: Vincent Garenq
- Screenplay by: Stéphane Cabel; Vincent Garenq
- Based on: L'Affaire des affaires and La Boîte noire by Denis Robert
- Produced by: Philip Boëffard; Christophe Rossignon
- Starring: Gilles Lellouche; Charles Berling; Laurent Capelluto; Florence Loiret Caille
- Cinematography: Renaud Chassaing
- Edited by: Vincent Garenq; Elodie Codaccioni; Raphaël de Monpezat
- Music by: Erwann Kermorvant
- Production companies: Nord-Ouest Productions; Samsa Film; Artémis Productions; France 3 Cinéma; Mars Films; Cool Industrie; Belgacom
- Distributed by: Mars Distribution (France)
- Release dates: 11 November 2014 (Sarlat Film Festival); 11 February 2015 (France)
- Running time: 106 minutes
- Countries: France; Luxembourg; Belgium
- Language: French
- Budget: $4.4 million
- Box office: $208.000

The Clearstream Affair (French title: L'Enquête) is a 2014 thriller film directed by Vincent Garenq, based on the Clearstream scandal in 2001.

== Cast ==
- Gilles Lellouche as Denis Robert
- Charles Berling as Judge Renaud Van Ruymbeke
- Laurent Capelluto as Imah Lahoud
- Florence Loiret Caille as Géraldine Robert
- Christian Kmiotek as Régis Hempel
- Grégoire Bonnet as Laurent Beccaria
- Antoine Gouy as Florian Bourges
- Eric Naggar as Jean-Louis Gergorin
- Laurent D'Olce as Vincent Peillon
- Gilles Arbona as General Rondot
- Hervé Falloux as Dominique de Villepin
- Thomas Séraphine as Arnaud Montebourg
- Sarah Suco as The Assistant

== Accolades ==
Award / Film Festival	Category	Recipients and nominees	Result
César Awards	Best Adaptation	Stéphane Cabel and Vincent Garenq	Nominated
Magritte Awards	Best Supporting Actor	Laurent Capelluto	Won
Jacques Deray Prize	—N/a	—N/a	Won

== Other works ==
Vincent Garenq's other films include

Baby Love, 2008,
Comme les autres, 2009,
Guilty (Présumé coupable), 2011,
Kalinka (Au nom de ma fille), 2016
