= Peter Sciberras =

Australian film editor

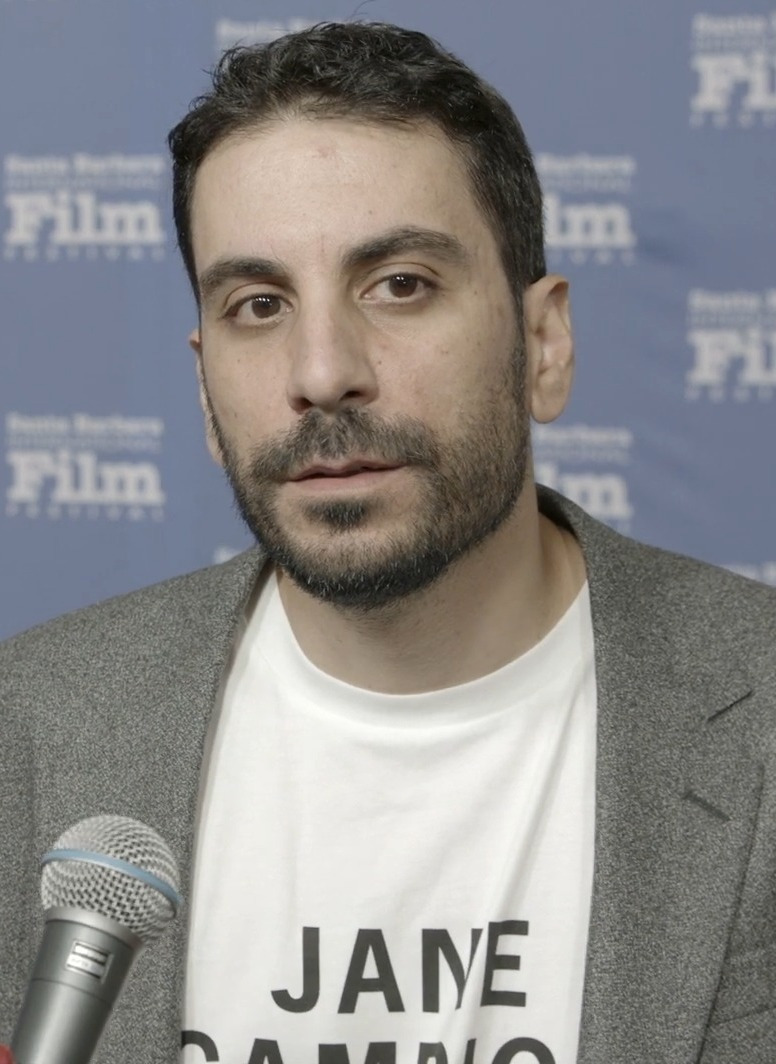
- Sciberras in 2022
- Occupation: Film editor

Peter Sciberras is an Australian film editor. He was nominated for an Academy Award in the category Best Film Editing for the film The Power of the Dog.

== Filmography ==
=== Film ===
Year	Title	Director	Notes
2011	Hail	Amiel Courtin-Wilson	1st of 2 collaborations with Wilson
2014	The Rover	David Michôd	1st of 3 collaborations with Michôd
2017	War Machine	David Michôd	
2019	The King	David Michôd	
2021	The Power of the Dog	Jane Campion	
2023	Carnation	Amiel Courtin-Wilson	Co-edited with Max Bowens, Luca Cappelli and Amiel Courtin-Wilson
2023	Foe	Garth Davis	
2024	Blitz	Steve McQueen	

=== Television ===
Year	Title	Director	Notes
2018	Mr Inbetween	Nash Edgerton	S1. E5 - "Hard Worker"; S1. E6 - "Your Mum's Got a Strongbox"

== Awards and nominations ==
Academy Awards

Year	Title	Category	Result	Notes
2022	The Power of the Dog	Best Film Editing	Nominated	

Alliance of Women Film Journalists

Year	Title	Category	Result
2022	The Power of the Dog	Best Editing	Won

Austin Film Critics Association Alliance of Women Film Journalists

Year	Title	Category	Result
2022	The Power of the Dog	Best Film Editing	Nominated

Chicago Film Critics Association Awards

Year	Title	Category	Result
2021	The Power of the Dog	Best Editing	Nominated

Critics' Choice Awards

Year	Title	Category	Result
2022	The Power of the Dog	Best Editing	Nominated

Gold Derby Film Awards

Year	Title	Category	Result
2022	The Power of the Dog	Best Film Editing	Nominated

Online Film Critics Society

Year	Title	Category	Result
2022	The Power of the Dog	Best Editing	Won

San Francisco Bay Area Film Critics Circle

Year	Title	Category	Result
2022	The Power of the Dog	Best Film Editing	Won

Santa Barbara International Film Festival

Year	Title	Category	Result
2022	The Power of the Dog	Variety Artisans Award	Won

Satellite Awards

Year	Title	Category	Result
2022	The Power of the Dog	Best Film Editing	Nominated

Seattle Film Critics Society

Year	Title	Category	Result
2022	The Power of the Dog	Best Film Editing	Nominated

Washington D.C. Area Film Critics Association

Year	Title	Category	Result
2021	The Power of the Dog	Best Editing	Nominated
