= Fa'afiaula Sagote =

Samoan actor (died 2022)

Fa'afiaula Sagote (1980 or 1981 – 24 October 2022) was a Samoan actor.

Sagote was working as a taro farmer and carpenter when he was approached by the director Tusi Tamasese, who offered him the lead part – that of dwarf farmer Saili – in what was to be Samoa's first ever feature film, The Orator (2011). The character is an ordinary man, looked down upon due to his lack of height, who seeks the strength to prove he can reclaim his father's chiefly status. In its review of the film, Variety described him as playing the part in a "tremendously soulful-eyed" way. For his performance, Sagote was a finalist for the Best Performance by an Actor Award at the 5th Asia Pacific Screen Awards.

Sagote used part of his earnings from the film to buy a taxi for his brother.

Sagote died on 24 October 2022, at the age of 41.
