= Vincent Garenq =

French filmmaker (born 1966)

- Garenq in 2026
- Born: 1966 (age 59–60); Saintes, Charente-Maritime, France
- Occupations: Film director, screenwriter

Vincent Garenq (French pronunciation: [vɛ̃sɑ̃ ɡaʁɑ̃k]; born 1966) is a French filmmaker. Known primarily for his works based on real-life events, he was nominated twice for the César Award for Best Adaptation for his films Guilty (2011) and The Clearstream Affair (2014).

== Early life ==
Garenq was born in Saintes, Charente-Maritime, France in 1966.

== Career ==
Garenq was admitted to the directing program at La Fémis in 1988. His 1992 graduation film, Vita sexualis, concerned the sexual awakening of an adolescent named Antoine.

After years working in television, Garenq's first feature film, the gay adoption dramedy Baby Love, debuted in 2008.

Garenq's 2011 film Guilty depicted the case of Alain Marécaux, a man falsely accused of pedophilia. The film debuted in the Venice Days section the 68th Venice International Film Festival.

The Clearstream Affair, Garenq's film based on the 2007 financial scandal, debuted in 2014. Garenq and co-writer Stéphane Cabrel were nominated for Best Adaptation at the 41st César Awards. His film Kalinka, based on the Kalinka Bamberski case, was released in 2016.

Garenq's film L'Abandon is slated to debut out of competition at the 2026 Cannes Film Festival.

== Filmography ==
Year	Title	Ref.
2008	Baby Love	
2011	Guilty	
2014	The Clearstream Affair	
2016	Kalinka	
2026	Forsaken	

== Awards and nominations ==
Year	Award	Category	Nominated work	Result	Ref.
2011	Venice Days	Label Europa Cinemas Award	Guilty	Won	
2011	Bratislava International Film Festival	Best Director	Guilty	Won	
2012	César Awards	Best Adaptation	Guilty	Nominated	
2016	César Awards	Best Adaptation	The Clearstream Affair	Nominated (Note: Shared with Stéphane Cabrel.)	
