= Villa 69 =

2013 film by Ayten Amin

- Directed by: Ayten Amin
- Written by: Muhammad El-Hajj; Mahmoud Ezzat
- Produced by: Khaled Abol Naga; Mohamed Hefzy; Wael Omar
- Starring: Khaled Abol Naga; Lebleba; Arwa Gouda
- Cinematography: Houssam Shahine
- Edited by: Emad Maher
- Music by: Samir Nabil
- Distributed by: Al Massa Art Production
- Release date: October 6, 2013
- Running time: 120 minutes
- Language: Arabic
- Budget: EGP 5.5 million

Villa 69 (Arabic: فيلا ٦٩) is a 2013 Egyptian film drama by director Ayten Amin, starring Khaled Abol Naga, Lebleba, and Arwa Gouda. The film stars Naga as a terminally ill architect who, while living happily in solitude, is forced to alter the way he lives when his sister and grandson move in with him. The film was directed by Amin and distributed by Al Massa Art Production. The film was shot in multiple locations in Egypt including Manial and Cairo.

The film Villa 69 was inspired by the director's (Ayten Amin's) father, who fell ill for two years before dying, which was the family's most intimate time with him. Amin states: "I realized that the last two years were the best ones." This experience with her father was not dramatic, but more about overcoming everyday conflicts. Therefore, in Amin's film, the terminally ill, moody old man, Hussein is a tribute to her own father; fighting with his elder sister and great-nephew, until his gentler side shows.

== Plot ==
Director Ayten Amin has created a film that falls somewhere in between a drama and a comedy, which offers a glimpse into the lifestyle and culture of everyday Egypt. By following the characters through times of illness, intimacy, joy, and death, Amin has created a film that truly engages her audience. The main character, Hussein (Khaled Abol Naga), is a cranky architect who suffers from a terminal illness (that is never explicitly mentioned in the film). Unable to connect emotionally with people, Hussein enjoys a life in solitary, living in his family’s old home. He takes pleasure in an occasional visit from his nurse, Hanaa (Heba Yousry) or lover, Sanna (Arwa Gouda). When Hussein’s sister, Nadra (Lebleba) and great-nephew Seif (Omar El Ghandour), move in with him, he becomes uncomfortable because he is forced to change his lifestyle. Hussein is now compelled to start thinking about someone other than himself.

Throughout the film, audience sees Hussein struggle with taking medication and having severe reactions to this medication which helps the audience know he is suffering from a deadly illness. Nadra and Seif are there to take care of Hussein by keeping up the house, helping him take medication, offering Hussein company, and keeping a watchful eye on him. Hussein hasn’t been into his office for work (architecture) in over a month, implying his deterioration.

Hussein warms up to Seif and Seif’s friend, Aya (Sally Abed), because of forced close-encounters. He becomes fond of Seif, his friends, and his garage band, eventually joining in and showing the young-ins “what real music is.” The film ends with a scene of Hussein, Seif, and Aya getting into an old car and driving into the city; revealing Hussein’s change of heart and his coming to terms with his own death.

== Cast ==
- Khaled Abol Naga as Hussein
- Lebleba as Nadra
- Arwa Gouda as Sanaa
- Omar El Ghandour as Seif
- Heba Yousry as Hanaa
- Khairy Beshara as The General
- Sally Abed as Aya
- Youssra El Hawary as Ehsan
- Emad Maher as Hamdy
- Amgad Riad as Heidar
- Sedky Sakhr as Salah

== Reception ==
Villa 69 has received a generally warm reception as a film which is complex and watchable, but perhaps too difficult a project for its young director Ayten Amin. Screen Daily's Mark Adams saw the film as both "impressively nuanced and dynamic," but also lacking consistency and focus. Thoraia Abou Bakr was generally happy with the performance, especially as the film could serve as a realistic window into Egyptian society for Westerners. She thought that Abol Naga gave a "convincing" performance, but also recognizes that "the first hour seems to stretch out mercilessly." Jenifer Evans wrote a much harsher critique for Mada Masr, describing how the film seemed aimless, and needed "a tough edit."

== Soundtrack ==
- Obscure, Object (2013-12-27). "Villa 69 (Soundtrack)". SoundCloud.

== Awards ==
Award	Category	Nominee	Result
Horus Award	Best Actor	Khaled Abol Naga	Win
Horus Award	Best Director (First Work)	Ayten Amin	Win
FIPRESCI Prize	N/A	Ayten Amin	Loss
