= Leiderman =

Leiderman is a surname. Notable people with the surname include:

- B. J. Leiderman (born 1956), American composer and songwriter
- Jay Leiderman (1971–2021), American criminal defense lawyer
- Leo Leiderman (born 1951), Israeli economist
- Yuri Leiderman (born 1963), Ukrainian artist and writer

== See also ==
- Liderman
