= Tahrir 2011: The Good, the Bad, and the Politician =

2011 Egyptian film by Ahmad Abdalla, Amr Salama

Tahrir 2011 : The Good, The Bad and the Politician
- Directed by: Tamer Ezzat; Ahmad Abdalla; Ayten Amin; Amr Salama
- Produced by: Frederic Sichler; Mohamed Hefzy
- Distributed by: Pacha Pictures
- Release date: September 8, 2011 (Venice)
- Running time: 90 minutes
- Country: Egypt
- Language: Arabic

Tahrir 2011: The Good, the Bad and the Politician (Arabic: تحرير 2011: الطيب والشرس والسياسي) is an Egyptian documentary directed by Tamer Ezzat, Ahmad Abdalla, Ayten Amin and Amr Salama. The film is divided in three parts covering respectively the protesters, the police forces and a profile of Hosni Mubarak by several political figures. The film mixes interviews and real footage from the demonstrations. It premiered at 68th Venice International Film Festival as an out of competition feature film and the 2011 Toronto International Film Festival in the Mavericks section.

== See also ==
- The Square, a 2013 Egyptian-American documentary film
