= Australian Film Critics Association =

Professional association of film critics and reviewers

The Australian Film Critics Association (AFCA, or Auscritic), formerly known as Melbourne Film Critics' Forum, is an Australian professional association for film critics, reviewers and journalists who work in the media, based in Melbourne. It is a member of the International Federation of Film Critics. The organisation is known for its film and writing awards, formerly Australian Film Critics Association or AFCA Awards, now known as Auscritic Awards. They are awarded annually in many categories.

== History ==
Formed in 1996, AFCA began as the Melbourne Film Critics' Forum, expanding to a national organisation in 2004. In the same year, AFCA became an Australian representative of the International Federation of Film Critics (FIPRESCI), which comprises the national organisations of professional film critics and film journalists from around the world. FIPRESCI has members in more than 50 countries worldwide. AFCA helped to establish the first FIPRESCI jury at the Adelaide Film Festival.

AFCA's members, several of whom contribute to internationally recognised media outlets, are professional film critics, film reviewers and film journalists, from all media forums, who provide informed discussion, analysis and comment on Australian and world cinema. Here are some of them (past and present):

- Adam Ross, Lachlan Marks, Alan James, Laura Bennett, Alex Thomas, Lawrence Barber, Alexandra Heller-Nicholas, Lee Zachariah, Lisa Thatcher, Ashley Beks, Luke Buckmaster, Marcella Papandrea, Bede Jermyn, Madeleine Swain, Mark Lavercombe, Cameron Williams, Matthew Toomey, Carol Van Opstal, Nicholas Brodie, Peter Krausz, Richard Alaba, David O'Connell, Andrew F Peirce, Nadine Whitney, Cerise Howard, Jamie Tran, Stephen A Russell, Travis Johnson, David Heslin, Jake Wilson, Karl Quinn, Glenn Dunks, Greg King, Lindsay Wilkins, Zak Hepburn, Emma Westwood, Thomas Caldwell, Josh Nelson, Lesley Chow, Sarah Ward, Jonathan Spiroff, Dave Griffiths

The body supports both mainstream and independent cinema and highlights significant or challenging films.

== Description and activities ==
The Australian Film Critics Association is an Australian professional association for film critics, reviewers, and journalists who work in the media, based in Collins Street West, Melbourne, Victoria. It serves as a network for dialogue among filmmakers, critics and reviewers, distributors, exhibitors, and other members of the film industry in Australia, and is a member of the International Federation of Film Critics (FIPRESCI).

AFCA hosts and co-hosts events in support of the Australian and international films. The organisation and its members have fostered relationships with the Australian Film Institute, the Melbourne Writers Festival, NFSA, the National Screenwriters Conference, Popcorn Taxi independent film festival and many other international film festivals. It also sponsors various events at film festivals in Australia.

== Awards ==
AFCA is known for its two major groups of awards: AFCA Writing Awards and the AFCA Film Awards.

The inaugural AFCA film awards, for films released in 2007, were announced on 22 January 2008. There were then four categories: Best Australian Film, Best Overseas Film, Best Documentary, and Best Unreleased Film. Since then, the categories have expanded, and now include acting (introduced in 2011), cinematography, screenwriting, and international films. Best Unreleased Film was discontinued.

AFCA writing awards began in 2009.

Now known as Auscritic Film Awards, as of 2026 awards are given in the following categories:

- Best Australian Film
- Best Director
- Best Actor
- Best Actor in a Supporting Role
- Best Editing
- Best Screenplay
- Best Cinematography
- Best Australian Documentary
- Best International Documentary
- Best International Film (English Language)
- Best International Film (Not in the English Language)

As of 2026 there are five Auscritic Writing and Broadcast Awards, with cash prizes:

- Ivan Hutchinson Award for best long-form writing on an Australian film ($500; named in honour of critic Ivan Hutchinson)
- Award for best review of an individual Australian film ($250)
- Award for best review of an individual non-Australian film ($250)
- Jim Murphy Broadcast award for best radio show or podcast ($250)
- Lee Gambin Award for Repertory Film Criticism: Cultural Coverage of a Film Made Prior to 1995 ($250) – in collaboration with Cinemaniacs

== Film award winners and nominees ==
Year		Best Australian	Best Overseas	Best Documentary	Best Unreleased
2007	Winner:	Noise	No Country for Old Men (US)	Forbidden Lie$ (Australia)	The Band's Visit (Israel)
2007	Commended:	The Home Song Stories	The Lives of Others (Germany)	Deep Water (UK)	-
2007	Commended:	Romulus, My Father	4 Months, 3 Weeks and 2 Days (Romania)	Sicko (US)	-
2008	Winner:	The Black Balloon	There Will Be Blood (US)	Man on Wire (UK)	In the City of Sylvia (Spain)
2008	Commended:	The Square	The Dark Knight (US)	Not Quite Hollywood (Australia)	Romance of Astree and Celadon (France/Italy/Spain)
2009	Winner:	Balibo	Let the Right One In (Sweden)	Of Time and the City (UK)	Un Lac (France)
2009	Commended:	Mary & Max, Samson and Delilah	Moon (UK), Wrestler (US), Up (US)	Encounters at the End of the World (Germany), Capitalism: A Love Story (US)	Love Exposure (Japan)
2010	Winner:	Animal Kingdom	The Social Network (US)	Exit Through the Gift Shop (UK)	Air Doll (Japan)
2010	Commended:	Beneath Hill 60, The Waiting City, Bran Nue Dae	Toy Story 3 (US), The Hurt Locker (US), Inception (US/UK)	Food, Inc. (US), La Danse (France/US), Gasland (US)	Tetro (US/Argentina/Spain/Italy), Film Socialisme (Switzerland/France), Berlin 36 (Germany)

In 2011 acting awards were introduced and the Best Unreleased Film category was discontinued.

Year	Best Film	Best International Film (English Language)	Best International Film (Foreign Language)	Best Documentary
2011	Snowtown	The Tree of Life (US)	Incendies (Canada)	Senna (UK)
2012	The Sapphires	Hugo (France/UK/US)	A Separation (Iran)	Searching for Sugar Man (Sweden/UK/Finland)
2013	Mystery Road	Django Unchained (US)	Amour (France/Germany/Austria)	Stories We Tell (Canada)
2014	The Babadook	The Grand Budapest Hotel (US/Germany)	Two Days, One Night (Belgium/France/Italy)	Jodorowsky's Dune (US/France)
2015	Mad Max: Fury Road	Birdman (US)	Phoenix (Germany)	Amy (UK)
2016	Girl Asleep	Arrival (US)	Mustang (France/Germany/Turkey)	Sherpa (Australia)
2017	Hounds of Love	Moonlight (US)	Toni Erdmann (Germany/Austria)	I Am Not Your Negro (France/US/Switzerland/Belgium)
2018	Sweet Country	You Were Never Really Here (UK/US/France)	Roma (Mexico)	Gurrumul (Australia)

Best Film (2019-2023):

Year	Film
2019	Sweet Country
2021	Nitram
2022	The Stranger
2023	Of an Age

== Writing award winners ==
In conjunction with its 2009 film awards, AFCA announced the results of its inaugural writing awards. The categories and winners are:

Year	Ivan Hutchinson Award for Writing on Australian Film	Award for Writing on Non-Australian Film	Award for a Review of an individual Australian Film	Award for a Review of an individual Non-Australian Film
2009	Loving Samson and Delilah, Therese Davis	Fake Politics for the Real America, Martyn Pedler	Disgrace, Alice Tynan	2012, Stephen Rowley
2010	Some of the Finest Films, Thomas Caldwell	A Feast of Love – Eros, Agape and The Food Film, Bernard Hemingway	The Loved Ones, Anders Wotzke	I'm Still Here, Luke Buckmaster
2011	Who's Afraid of the Working Class? We Are, Rebecca Harkins-Cross	Islands and Ghosts: Roman Polanski's The Ghost Writer, Jake Wilson	Griff the Invisible, Alice Tynan	Uncle Boonmee Who Can Recall His Past Lives, Josh Nelson
2012	God in all things: Amiel Courtin-Wilson's Hail, Josh Nelson	The Shape of Rage: David Cronenberg's Dangerous Methods, Rebecca Harkins Cross	All the Way Through Evening, Michael Scott	The Perks of Being a Wallflower, Laurence Barber
2013	Launching The Rocket: Beyond the Typical Australian Film, Glenn Dunks	Through the Mind: Paul Thomas Anderson's The Master, Scott MacLeod	The Great Gatsby, Simon Miraudo	To the Wonder, Simon Di Berardino
2014	Anger and Banality in Ghosts... of the Civil Dead, Thomas Caldwell	Time Enough at Last: The Long History of the Long Film, Jake Moody	The Babadook, Alexandra Donald	Boyhood, Kristen S. He
2015	The Shadow of the Rock, Rebecca Harkins-Cross	–	Mad Max: Fury Road, Alexandra Heller-Nicholas	Bridge of Spies, Luke Goodsell
2016	South of Ealing: recasting a British studio's antipodean escapade, Adrian Danks	–	Joe Cinque's Consolation, Lauren Carroll Harris	No Home Movie, Ivan Cercina
2017	Dog Day, Every Day: Gillian Leahy’s Baxter and Me and the Essay Film, Adrian Martin	–	Ellipsis, Luke Buckmaster	Risk, Glenn Dunks
2018	The art of metamorphosis: Julian Rosefeldt's 'Manifesto, Gabrielle O'Brien	–	West of Sunshine, Andrew Peirce	Disobedience, Glen Falkenstein

== See also ==
- List of film awards
