= Lung Neaw Visits His Neighbours =

2011 documentary film

- Directed by: Rirkrit Tiravanija
- Written by: Rirkrit Tiravanija
- Produced by: Cristian Manzutto; Rirkrit Tiravanija
- Starring: Neaw Lung
- Cinematography: Cristian Manzutto; Rirkrit Tiravanija
- Edited by: Cristian Manzutto
- Release date: 2011
- Running time: 154 min.
- Language: Thai

Lung Neaw Visits His Neighbours is a 2011 Thai-Mexican documentary film co-directed by Rirkrit Tiravanija. A portrait of a retired Thai rice farmer from the Chiang Mai province, it premiered at the 68th edition of the Venice Film Festival, in the Horizons competition.

== Reception ==
Stephen Holden noted the film "rewards concentration once you adjust to its glacial pace and its radically minimalist aesthetic". Michael Atkinson also praised the film, writing it is "so pure, uninflected, and empty of intent that over its length (more than 2.5 hours), it feels like a meditation you had by accident. Finally, a doc that’s an experience, not just an infantilized civics lesson".
