= Untitled (free still) =

Series of artworks by Rirkrit Tiravanija

Untitled (free/still) 1992/1995/2007/2011 is a series of artworks by Thai artist Rirkrit Tiravanija. Trained in Canada, the New York-based artist's installations often take the form of stages or rooms for sharing meals, cooking, reading or playing music; architecture or structures for living and socialising are a core element in his work.

In this conceptual piece, Tiravanija invites the visitor to interact, in a sociable manner, with this contemporary art. The artist aims to bridge the distance between the viewer and the artist. The viewer is part of the art, and is constantly creating the art as they eat curry and talk with friends or new acquaintances.

== Origins ==
Tiravanija's first solo exhibition was called Untitled (Free). In 1992, the 303 Gallery in the SoHo neighbourhood of Manhattan, played host to the exhibition. The contents within the gallery's back rooms, were moved by the artist into the exhibition space. The business of art was on display, as an emptied office was transformed into temporary kitchen, where anyone who wanted a portion of Thai green vegetable curry was served some by Tiravanija's.

== Iterations ==
Since 1992, the work had several iterations. "Still," was added to the title by the artist when the piece was re-presented at 'The Carnegie International exhibition,' in Pittsburg in 1995.

The David Zwirner Gallery in Manhattan played host to the artwork when the artist restaged it once again in 2007. This time, Tiravanija recreated the space of the original exhibition and reemployed the furnishings and leftovers from past presentations. This included the likes of crates, boxes, empty cans and food items. As part of MoMA’s collection, today, the piece can be displayed either as a vestige of its earlier manifestations or reactivated with food prepared in the Museum’s kitchen.

== Today ==
Rirkrit Tiravanija's work was on display at the Hirshhorn Museum and Sculpture Garden, as a piece of performance art, performed by the visitors and local muralists. Thursdays through Sundays, curry is served between 11:30 am and 1:30 pm, through July 24th 2019, to the first 150 or co comers, or until they run out of supplies.

The Museum has had to alter the exhibition in order to deliver in to the Washington D.C. community. This included not allowing an open flame. The Museum director Melissa Chiu said she is "excited to introduce Tiravanija's interactive culinary experience to the Washington, D.C. community” with a piece that “offers new perspectives on the ways in which art and creativity are used to interpret political and social issues of our time.”

MoMA recreated the landmark piece as part of the installation 'Contemporary Galleries:1980-Now.' On display and replicate to scale on the second floor, this back office curry kitchen benefitted from the aid of Tiravanija to recreate the experience.
