= Forsaken (2026 film) =

2026 French film by Vincent Garenq

- French: L'Abandon
- Directed by: Vincent Garenq
- Written by: Vincent Garenq; Alexis Kebbas; Mickaëlle Paty
- Based on: The Last Days of Samuel Paty by Stéphane Simon
- Produced by: Stéphane Simon; Marion de Blaÿ; François Kraus; Denis Pineau-Valencienne
- Starring: Antoine Reinartz; Emmanuelle Bercot; Nedjim Bouizzoul; Azize Kabouche; Mounira Barbouch; Marie-Sohna Condé; Barbara Bolotner
- Cinematography: Renaud Chassaing
- Edited by: Aurique Delannoy
- Music by: Nicolas Errèra
- Production companies: Outside Films; Les Films du Kiosque; UGC; France 3 Cinéma; Umedia
- Distributed by: UGC
- Release dates: 13 May 2026 (Cannes); 13 May 2026 (France)
- Running time: 100 minutes
- Country: France
- Language: French
- Box office: $5.5 million

Forsaken (French: L'Abandon) is a 2026 French biographical drama film directed by Vincent Garenq, co-written with Alexis Kebbas and Mickaëlle Paty, based on the nonfiction book "The Last Days of Samuel Paty" by Stéphane Simon. Starring Antoine Reinartz as Samuel Paty, it follows the last eleven days of the French teacher, who was attacked and killed by an Islamic fundamentalist in Paris in 2020.

The film had its world premiere out of competition of the 2026 Cannes Film Festival on 13 May, and was theatrically released in France by UGC on the same day.

== Premise ==
The film follows the last eleven days of Samuel Paty, a history and geography teacher who was murdered with a knife and beheaded on his way home in Conflans-Sainte-Honorine, Paris, on 16 October 2020, by a Chechen jihadist, after being defamed on social media by the father of a student for showing Charlie Hebdo's caricatures of Muhammad during a lesson on freedom of expression.

== Cast ==
- Antoine Reinartz as Samuel Paty
- Emmanuelle Bercot as Victoire Lanion, the school principal
- Nedjim Bouizzoul as Kader Saidi
- Azize Kabouche as Tahar Amara
- Emma Boumali as Bashira Saidi
- Diamadoua Sissoko as Omar
- Mounira Barbouch as Malika
- Marie-Sohna Condé as Firmine
- Barbara Bolotner as Colette
- Alexandre Blazy as Alain
- Emmanuel Lemire as Bernard
- Jean-Michel Lahmi as Guislain
- Émilie Pierson as Véronique
- Pascale Mariani as Isabelle
- Camille Levy Brito-Mendes as Thomas
- Éric Génovèse
- François Pérache

== Production ==
It was produced by Outside Films and Les Films du Kiosque, in co-production with UGC, France 3 Cinéma and Umedia, with the support of Canal+ and La Région Île-de-France, and the participation of Ciné+ OCS and France Télévisions.

The screenplay was written by Vincent Garenq and Alexis Kebbas, in collaboration with one of Samuel Paty's sisters, Mickaëlle Paty, and is loosely based on the investigative book, "Les Derniers Jours de Samuel Paty" (The Last Days of Samuel Paty), written by French journalist Stéphane Simon and published in 2023.

Garenq states that the film didn't seek any physical resemblance between the actors and the people they portray; he did not want to film a copy of reality, but to be as close as possible to the facts.

=== Filming ===
Principal photography began on 2 July 2025 in Noisy-le-Roi, in the Yvelines. Shooting wrapped by 4 August.

UGC confirmed that the film was shot in secrecy, its release was announced only a few hours after the verdict in Paty's appeal trial concerning the four men involved in the assassination: "We chose not to communicate in order to give priority to justice and the appeal trial. With the verdict now delivered, we hope that this film will take over, so that the story of Samuel Paty does not fall into oblivion".

== Release ==
The film had its world premiere out of competition of the 2026 Cannes Film Festival on 13 May, and was theatrically released in France by UGC on the same day.

== Response ==
=== Box office ===
It grossed $5.5 million at the French box office.
