= My Aunt's Theory =

- Film poster
- Arabic: نظرية عمتى
- Directed by: Akram Farid
- Written by: Omar Taher
- Produced by: Walid Al Kurdi
- Starring: Lebleba; Horria Farghali; Hassan Al Radad
- Production company: New Century production
- Release date: August 7, 2013
- Country: Egypt
- Language: Arabic

My Aunt's Theory (Arabic: نظرية عمتى) is a comedy film directed by Akram Farid. The film stars Lebleba and Hassan Al Radad (who plays three different characters), and follows a woman trying to attract the attention of the host of the talk show that she edits.

== Plot ==
The movie follows a young lady on a search for the perfect man, according to her aunt's theory on love and relationships. She finally falls in love with a famous TV program presenter, but their problems begin due to his fame and the growing number of his female fans.
