= Luxor (film) =

- Theatrical release poster
- Directed by: Zeina Durra
- Written by: Zeina Durra
- Produced by: Mohamed Hefzy; Gianluca Chakra; Mamdouh Saba; Zeina Durra
- Starring: Andrea Riseborough; Michael Landes; Salima Ikram; Shahira Fahmy
- Cinematography: Zelmira Gainza
- Edited by: Andrea Chignoli
- Production company: Film Clinic
- Release date: January 2020 (Sundance)
- Running time: 85 minutes
- Countries: Egypt; United Kingdom
- Languages: English; Arabic

Luxor is a 2020 romantic drama film directed by Zeina Durra. It is about a young aid worker, Hanna, who becomes overwhelmed by treating victims from the Syrian war, takes a solo trip to Egypt and runs into an old flame. It was released on 6 November 2020 in digital format.

== Plot ==
When British aid worker Hana returns to the ancient city of Luxor, she comes across Sultan, a talented archaeologist and former lover. As she wanders, haunted by the familiar place, she struggles to reconcile the choices of the past with the uncertainty of the present.

== Cast ==
- Andrea Riseborough as Hana
- Michael Landes as Carl
- Shereen Reda as Dunia
- Karim Saleh as Sultan
- Zahra Indigo Rønlov as Indigo
- Violet Brannan as Jane

== Release ==
The film was screened at the 2020 Sundance Film Festival in the World Cinema Dramatic Competition. It was released on 6 November 2020 in digital format.

== Reception ==
On the review aggregator website Rotten Tomatoes, 90% of 73 critics' reviews are positive, with an average rating of 6.8/10. The website's consensus reads: "Led by Andrea Riseborough's layered performance, Luxor empathetically surveys the crossroads between trauma and recovery." Metacritic, which uses a weighted average, assigned the film a score of 69 out of 100, based on 5 critics, indicating "generally favorable" reviews.

Leslie Felperin of The Guardian gave the film 4/5 stars, praising the actors' performances and writing, "Like director Joanna Hogg, Durra excels at suggesting subtexts and undercurrents threaded through everyday conversations." Tara Brady of The Irish Times gave the film 3/5 stars, writing, "A straight companion piece for Hong Khaou's meditative Monsoon, Luxor offers a strange marriage of travelogue, post-traumatic stress disorder, spirituality and something like romance."

Robert Abele of the Los Angeles Times called the film "a satisfyingly meditative, history-laden space, one that asks us to consider how we reconcile our experiences with our present, and, as a result, with whom we want to be."Variety's Jay Weissberg wrote, "Saleh has a solid résumé in international productions including TV, and he's well-paired with Riseborough in the way he exudes a gentle solidity that Hana needs yet also partly resists, unsure if she can cope with any more emotional attachments."
