= Seeking Haven for Mr. Rambo =

2024 film

- Directed by: Khaled Mansour
- Written by: Khaled Mansour; Mohamed El-Hosseiny
- Produced by: Mohamed Hefzy; Rasha Hosny
- Starring: Essam Omar; Rakeen Saad; Ahmed Bahaa; Samaa Ibrahim
- Cinematography: Ahmed Tarek Bayoumi
- Edited by: Yasser Azmy
- Music by: Ahmad Mostafa Zaky
- Production company: Film Clinic
- Distributed by: Film Clinic Indie Distribution (worldwide); Misr International Films (Egypt); Front Row Filmed Entertainment (GCC)
- Release dates: 4 September 2024 (Venice); 1 January 2025 (Egypt)
- Running time: 102 minutes
- Countries: Egypt; Saudi Arabia
- Language: Arabic

Seeking Haven for Mr. Rambo (Arabic: البحث عن منفذ لخروج السيد رامبو, romanized: Al Bahs an Manfaz i Khoroug al Sayed Rambo) is a 2024 drama film co-written and directed by Khaled Mansour in his directorial debut. A co-production between Egypt and Saudi Arabia, the film had its world premiere in the Orizzonti Extra sidebar of the 81st Venice International Film Festival, marking Egyptian cinema's return to Venice's official selection after a twelve-year absence, the previous entry having been Ibrahim El Batout's Winter of Discontent in the Orizzonti programme in 2012. The film went on to win the Grand Prize and the Critics' Prize at the Cinemamed Brussels Mediterranean Film Festival, the Yusr Jury Award at the Red Sea International Film Festival, and a Special Mention from the international jury at the 35th Carthage Film Days, before being released in Egyptian and wider Arab cinemas in January 2025.

== Plot ==
Thirty-year-old Hassan lives in a working-class neighbourhood of Cairo with his mother and his dog, Rambo, having largely withdrawn from life since his father abandoned the family in his childhood. Hassan and his mother face eviction from their long-time home by their landlord Karem, a car mechanic who wants to expand his workshop and has abandoned the goodwill his late father once showed the family's tenants. When Hassan's mother takes legal action to fight the eviction, Karem responds with escalating hostility, and during a violent confrontation Rambo bites Karem to defend Hassan. Humiliated, Karem vows revenge on the dog, forcing Hassan to go on the run across Cairo in search of somewhere safe to hide Rambo.

The search takes Hassan back into his own past: he calls on his estranged uncle, his last link to his absent father, and reconnects with Asmaa, a former romantic interest who has since moved on but with whom old feelings resurface. Assisted by a friend who works at an under-resourced government veterinary hospital, and later by an animal-welfare activist, Hassan eventually arranges to have Rambo smuggled to safety outside the country. Robbed of his target, an enraged Karem has Hassan and his mother evicted from their home, leaving mother and son to an uncertain fate. According to Mansour, the story was inspired by a real incident that took place in 2015 in Giza, although the real-life case ended far more grimly than the film's.

== Cast ==
- Essam Omar as Hassan
- Rakeen Saad as Asmaa
- Ahmed Bahaa as Karem
- Samaa Ibrahim as Hassan's mother

Ahmed Bahaa, co-founder of the band Sharmoofers, made his acting debut in the role of Karem. The supporting cast includes Basma, Yosra El Lozy, Hassan El-Adl, Ahmed Al Salakawi, Khaled Gawad, Hager Hatem, Gehad Hossam El-Din, Nancy Alam El-Din, Fahd Ibrahim, Hisham Hussain and Nezar El-Maghriby.

== Production ==
Khaled Mansour, born in Cairo in 1991, studied history at Cairo University and pursued filmmaking independently, directing three short films and a number of commercials between 2015 and 2022 before making his feature debut with this film. The project, then produced by Patchwork Productions, won the $10,000 Lagoonie Film Production Prize at the CineGouna SpringBoard development lab, held during the 4th El Gouna Film Festival in 2020, to support the film through its development phase. It was subsequently developed through the Red Sea Film Foundation's Red Sea Lodge programme in 2021, and received production grants from the Red Sea Film Fund, the Arab Fund for Arts and Culture (AFAC) and Fonds Image de la Francophonie, as well as a Visual Identity and DCP Services Award from Creative Media Solutions at the fifth Amman Film Industry Days and Amman Project Market. By the time of its Venice premiere, the film was produced by Mohamed Hefzy through Film Clinic, with Rasha Hosny making her debut as a feature film producer.

== Release ==
Seeking Haven for Mr. Rambo had its world premiere at the 81st Venice International Film Festival on 4 September 2024, in the Orizzonti Extra sidebar, with a further public screening the following morning. It went on to screen in the official competition of the 24th Cinemamed Brussels Mediterranean Film Festival on 29–30 November 2024, where, alongside Red Path, it was one of two Egyptian-linked films to dominate the festival's awards. The film then competed at the 11th Duhok International Film Festival in Iraq and, in the official competition for the Tanit d'Or, at the 35th Carthage Film Days (JCC) in Tunisia between 14 and 21 December 2024, and screened in competition at the fourth edition of the Red Sea International Film Festival in Jeddah in December 2024.

The film opened theatrically in Egypt on 1 January 2025, distributed by Misr International Films, followed on 9 January 2025 by a wider release across roughly 100 cinemas in Morocco, Saudi Arabia, the United Arab Emirates, Bahrain, Kuwait and Oman (about 90 screens in the Gulf and 10 in Morocco), handled internationally by Film Clinic Indie Distribution and, in the GCC, by Front Row Filmed Entertainment. It subsequently opened in additional Gulf territories, including the UAE and Saudi Arabia, on 5 and 6 February 2025 respectively, and had its United States premiere at the Santa Barbara International Film Festival in California, with screenings on 9, 11 and 14 February 2025. The film later had its United Kingdom premiere at the SAFAR Film Festival in June 2025 and its Jordanian premiere at the Amman International Film Festival in July 2025, and was also shown at festivals including the Minneapolis St. Paul International Film Festival, the Festival International du Film de Fribourg and the Aflam festival in Marseille. It is also available to stream on Shahid VIP.

== Reception ==
The film was awarded the Grand Prize in the official competition, as well as the Critics' Prize, at the 2024 Cinemamed Brussels Mediterranean Film Festival. At the fourth Red Sea International Film Festival, held in Jeddah, it received the Yusr Jury Award from the festival's international jury, chaired by Spike Lee. It also received a Special Mention from the international jury at the 35th Carthage Film Days. The film's teaser separately won Best Teaser (MENA Region) at the 2024 Global Entertainment Awards.

Screen International's film critic Wendy Ide praised the film, describing it as "a quality picture that announces Mansour as a notable talent in Egyptian independent filmmaking", and wrote that "the theme [...] is hardly a new one. Still, this feature [...] impresses, bringing a distinctively gritty flavour to its vision of lives on the fringes of working class Cairo". Ali Benzekri from International Cinephile Society praised Mansour's "deliberate sobriety that grounds the film in an extreme realism" as well as Essam Omar's performance, that "places him firmly in the conversation about the future of Egyptian cinema, particularly for up-and-coming actors. His ability to convey profound emotional depth without relying heavily on dialogue speaks volumes about his range and presence on screen". Writing for IONCINEMA, Kevin Jagernauth called the film a "tough yet compassionate feature debut" and an "intriguing study of different kinds of self-interested masculinity", giving it three and a half out of five stars and singling out Ahmed Tarek Bayoumi's cinematography and the lead performances of Essam Omar and Rakeen Saad.

== Accolades ==
Festival / award	Category	Result	Ref
CineGouna SpringBoard (4th El Gouna Film Festival), 2020	Lagoonie Film Production Prize	Won	
5th Amman Film Industry Days (AFID)	Visual Identity and DCP Services Award (Creative Media Solutions)	Won	
81st Venice International Film Festival, 2024	Orizzonti Extra (Official Selection)	Selected	
Cinemamed Brussels Mediterranean Film Festival, 2024	Grand Prize (Official Competition)	Won	
Cinemamed Brussels Mediterranean Film Festival, 2024	Critics' Prize	Won	
Red Sea International Film Festival, 2024	Yusr Jury Award	Won	
35th Carthage Film Days (JCC), 2024	Special Mention (International Jury)	Won	
Global Entertainment Awards, 2024	Best Teaser (MENA Region)	Won	
