= Rirkrit Tiravanija =

Thai artist

- Born: 1961 (age 64–65); Buenos Aires, Argentina

Rirkrit Tiravanija (Thai: ฤกษ์ฤทธิ์ ตีระวนิช, pronounced [rɯkrit tirawanit]) is a Thai contemporary artist who lives and works in New York City, Berlin, and Chiang Mai, Thailand. He was born in Buenos Aires, Argentina, in 1961. His installations often take the form of stages or rooms for sharing meals, cooking, reading or playing music; spaces for living and socialising are a core element of his work.

== Early life and education ==
The son of a Thai diplomat and an oral surgeon, Tiravanija was born in Buenos Aires in 1961 and was raised in Thailand, Ethiopia and Canada. He learned English at an international school in Ethiopia before being sent to a Catholic school back home in Thailand, where his grandmother ran a garden restaurant.

After initially studying history at Carleton University, he subsequently enrolled at the Ontario College of Art in Toronto (1980–84), the Banff Center School of Fine Arts (1984), the School of the Art Institute of Chicago (1984–86), and the Whitney Independent Studies Program in New York (1985–86). He moved to Manhattan in 1982.

== Work ==
=== EATING ===
According to the art historian Rochelle Steiner, Tiravanija's work "is fundamentally about bringing people together". The artist's early-1990s installations involved cooking meals for gallery-goers. In one of his best-known series, beginning with pad thai (1990) at the Paula Allen Gallery in New York, he rejected traditional art objects altogether and instead cooked and served food to exhibition visitors. He used a Westernised recipe that was being popularised by an expatriate Englishwoman who had written a cookbook after visiting Bangkok; the recipe substituted ketchup for tamarind paste, and the meal was prepared in a West Bend wok, a recently introduced appliance.

This work also led to Tiravanija's first solo exhibition in SoHo, which reused the title of his earlier piece, Untitled (free/still). The installation allowed participants to interact with one another as they were served pad Thai curry; the artist sought not only to encourage conversation among visitors but also to offer comfort through the shared experience of eating the same meal together.

Tiravanija later recreated the installation in 2007 at the David Zwirner Gallery in Chelsea, using the original elements and retitling the work Untitled (free still). In 1995 he presented a similar untitled work at the Carnegie International exhibition at the Carnegie Museum of Art, where he included wall text that provided written instructions for cooking South-east Asian green curry, which was then prepared for visitors. As a prelude to the opening of La Triennale in 2012, Tiravanija was invited to transform the main nave of the Grand Palais into a large-scale, twelve-hour festive banquet centred on a single dish, tom kha soup (Soup/No Soup, 2012).

In 2015, Tiravanija and Gavin Brown opened Unclebrother, a combined restaurant and gallery in a former car dealership in Hancock, New York.

Tiravanija's work has been widely discussed in relation to the deep understanding of social experience rather than material objects. His installations often require participation, conversation and shared activity, positioning the viewer as an active contributor rather than a passive observer. By focusing on people gathering, eating and interacting, his work challenges the traditional distinctions between artist and audience. Critics have noted that these projects foreground everyday actions as meaningful artistic gestures, emphasising the role of community and human connection in contemporary art.

=== Living ===
Other exhibitions are also based on interaction and exchange among participants. Some viewers, like the students who lived in Untitled 1999, a recreation of Tiravanija's East Village apartment, actually moved in for the duration of an exhibition. A 2005 solo show at Serpentine Gallery, London, featured two new, full-scale replicas of this apartment, complete with kitchen, bath, and bedroom. In other projects, he has bricked up the entrance to gallery spaces, rendering them impenetrable for the duration of the respective exhibition. Tiravanija painted the words " Ne Travaillez Jamais" on the wall, a phrase lifted from the May 1968, protest riots in Paris.

When Tiravanija does make objects, they are most often multiples and ephemera connected with exhibitions. Since the early 1990s, Tiravanija has published multiples in the form of backpacks, cooking utensils, and maps as part of his practice. These commonplace objects used for cooking or camping serve today as memories of the artist's earlier projects and also stimulate new interactions, whether physical or purely in the imagination. In Untitled 2008–2011 (the map of the land of feeling), Tiravanija presents a visual chronology of his life and work between 1988 and 2008, as told through the pages of his expansive passport.

In 1997 Tiravanija began an engagement with modernist architecture when he installed in the Museum of Modern Art's sculpture garden Untitled: 1997 (Glass House), a child-size version of Philip Johnson's Glass House (1949). Similarly, untitled 2002 (he promised) is an arena of activities ranging from DJ sessions to film screenings within a chrome and steel structure inspired by Rudolf M. Schindler's Kings Road House (1922) in West Hollywood. In Tiravanija's untitled 2006 (pavilion, table and puzzle) installation, visitors are welcome to gather at a picnic table to assemble an expansive puzzle depicting Eugène Delacroix's 1830 masterpiece, Liberty Leading the People; a pavilion-like structure, a replica of one designed by Jean Prouvé for use in French colonial Africa, completes the tableau. For Asile Flottant (2010), he constructed a sketch of Le Corbusier's boat of the same name and inserted a section of it into a gallery. Le Corbusier's barge was designed for the Salvation Army literally as a floating asylum meant to provide temporary overnight shelter for vagrants wandering the streets of Paris; Tiravanija's barge, constructed in Chiang Mai, was to serve as a pavilion that houses both political T-shirts designed by the artist, and others that have been collected from all over the world.

In 2004 the Solomon R. Guggenheim Museum in New York honoured Tiravanija with the Hugo Boss Prize and presented an exhibition of his work, which had more overtly political tones. Featured in this exhibition, Untitled 2005 (The Air Between the Chain-Link Fence and the Broken Bicycle Wheel) was an installation in which the artist addressed governmental control of popular media by installing a low-tech pirate television station within the museum, using a simple metal antenna and cables as broadcasting equipment, accompanied by a small wooden structure housing a television set and chairs. On the gallery walls Tiravanija featured the text of the US Constitution's First Amendment (advocating freedom of speech), a history of radio and television communication in America, and simple directions for constructing low-tech broadcasting equipment. Tiravanija's support of free speech is conveyed by his choice to broadcast the low-budget film Punishment Park (1971), a documentary on the suppression of Vietnam War protests.

=== Opera ===
For the season 2006/2007 in the Vienna State Opera, Tiravanija designed the large scale picture (176 sqm) "Fear Eats the Soul" as part of the exhibition series "Safety Curtain", conceived by museum in progress.

Alongside Hans Ulrich Obrist and Philippe Parreno, Tiravanija staged the opera Il Tempo del postino ('Postman Time') with the participation of a number of leading contemporary visual artists, first unveiled at the Manchester International Festival in 2007 and later at Art Basel fair in an expanded form in 2009.

"It is not what you see that is important but what takes place between people."

=== Film ===
Tiravanija released Chew the Fat in 2008. The work presents filmic portraits of twelve artists, all chosen by Tiravanija, that belong to the same generation as him, that rose to critical attention in the 1990s. All good friends, they rose to international success. Relating to the name, they create a relaxed situation where conversation flows naturally, with personal issues arising to do with work and career.

It premiered as part of the exhibition "theanyspacewhatever" at the Solomon R. Guggenheim Museum in New York. Tiravanija's second feature film, Lung Neaw Visits His Neighbours was released in 2011. The film was shown at the Orizzonti section of the 68th Venice International Film Festival. The documentary features a retired farmer that lives in a tranquil village in Chiang Mai, far from the recent political turmoil in Bangkok. At a moment when many people are demanding equality, opportunity, and democracy, we see in Lung Neaw an existence marked by compassion for his environment and his fellow villagers. The film offers a contemplative look at one man's humble dialogue with his surroundings.

== Other activities ==
=== Curatorial projects ===
Tiravanija was the co-curator of the Station Utopia project at the 2003 Venice Biennale together with Hans Ulrich Obrist and Molly Nesbit. In 1998, he co-founded a collaborative educational-ecological project known as The Land Foundation with Thai artist Kamin Lerdchaiprasert, located in the northern part of Thailand, near the village of Sanpathong, 20 km southwest from the provincial city of Chiang Mai. The project combines contemporary art interventions and agricultural traditional values; the six-hectare land is intended to be cultivated as an open space or community free from ownership, and residents and artists are welcomed to use a plot of land as a laboratory for development‚ cultivating rice, building sustainable houses, or channeling solar power. Tiravanija is also part of a collective alternative space called Gallery VER located in Bangkok. He maintains his primary residence and studio in Chiang Mai.

In 2009, Tiravanija was a member of a think tank established to define the model and architecture of the Guggenheim Urdaibai, an annex for the existing Guggenheim Museum Bilbao.

=== Teaching ===
Tiravanija is a Professor of Professional Practice in Visual Arts in the Faculty of the Arts at Columbia University.

=== Juries ===
Tiravanija served on the jury that awarded the inaugural Serpentine x FLAG Art Foundation Prize to Gozo Yoshimasu in 2026.

== Exhibitions ==
Tiravanija's work has been presented widely at museums and galleries throughout the world including solo exhibitions at the Drawing Center, New York (2008); Musée d'Art Moderne de la Ville de Paris (2005); Serpentine Gallery, London (2005); Galerie für Zeitgenössische Kunst, Leipzig (2003); Secession, Vienna (2002); Portikus, Frankfurt (2001); Center for Contemporary Art, Kitakyushu, Japan (2000); Los Angeles County Museum of Art (1999); and the Museum of Modern Art, New York (1997).

He had a retrospective exhibition at the Museum Boijmans Van Beuningen in Rotterdam that then was presented in Paris and London. He has participated in such notable group exhibitions as the Sharjah Biennial 8, United Arab Emirates (2007); 27th São Paulo Biennial, Brazil (2006); Whitney Biennial 2006: Day for Night, New York City (2005); the 50th Venice Biennale (2003); and Skulptur Projekte Münster (1997). Tiravanija participated in the 9th Gwangju Biennale (2012).

In 2019, the Hirshhorn Museum and Sculpture Garden in Washington, D.C. premiered Rirkrit Tiravanija: (who's afraid of red, yellow, and green) which, in addition to transforming the museum's galleries into a communal dining space, invited local artists to participate in the creation of a communal mural over the course of the three-month long exhibition. Visitors of the museum were given the opportunity to have a bowl of curry whilst also discussing with each other the murals that were displayed around them, notably, portraying significant historical events such as Martin Luther King Jr.'s March on Washington in 1963. The title of the exhibition and the colours of the curry referred to the different colours worn by the various factions in recent Thai government protests. Tiravanija claimed that the purpose of this exhibition and the three colours of the curry is "nourishing food for the belly while contemplating the images' food for thought."

== Critical reception ==
Tiravanija's work, which explores the social role of the artist, has been regularly cited by the French curator Nicolas Bourriaud as exemplary of his conception of relational art. In challenging the emancipatory claims made for Tiravanija's practice and for relational art more broadly, however, Claire Bishop has criticised him for benefiting from a "ubiquitous presence on the international art scene" and for "collaps[ing] into compensatory (and self-congratulatory) entertainment".

== Recognition ==
Tiravanija's work has been recognised with numerous awards and grants, including a Gordon Matta Clark Foundation Award, the Louis Comfort Tiffany Foundation Biennial Competition Award (1993), a National Endowment for the Arts Visual Artist Fellowship (1994), the Benesse Prize from the Naoshima Contemporary Art Museum in Japan, the Lucelia Artist Award from the Smithsonian American Art Museum (2003), and the Hugo Boss Prize from the Solomon R. Guggenheim Museum in New York (2004). In 2011, Stefano Pasquini dedicated a song to him on the CD Canzoni che costano un po' meno del solito.

== Notable works in public collections ==
- Untitled (pad-see-ew) (1990/2002), San Francisco Museum of Modern Art
- Untitled (free/still) (1992/1995/2007/2011-), Museum of Modern Art, New York
- Untitled (rucksack installation) (1993), Museum of Modern Art, New York
- Catalogue (Back of Postcard Reads) Memories (1997), Walker Art Center, Minneapolis
- Untitled (he promised) (2002), The Guggenheim, New York
- (a film title for an unrealized film) (2004), Whitney Museum of American Art, New York
- Untitled (Cooking corner version # 3) (2005), Centre Pompidou, Paris
- Untitled (sleep on earth, eat on sand) (2005), Tate, London
- Untitled (pavilion, table, and puzzle representing the famous painting by Delacroix La Liberté Guidant le Peuple, 1830) (2006), Walker Art Center, Minneapolis
- Untitled (bicycle shower) (2010), Baltimore Museum of Art
- (Who's Afraid of Red, Yellow, and Green) (2010), Hirshhorn Museum and Sculpture Garden, Smithsonian Institution, Washington, DC
- Fear Eats the Soul (2011), Glenstone, Potomac, Maryland
- Untitled (up against the wall motherfucker) (2014), Hammer Museum, Los Angeles

== Personal life ==
Tiravanija was married to the painter Elizabeth Peyton in 1991. The couple separated in the late 1990s and divorced in 2004. Both are represented by Gavin Brown's Enterprise in New York and neugerriemschneider in Berlin.

Tiravanija has a weekend home in the Catskills.
