= Lebleba =

Egyptian actress (born 1946)

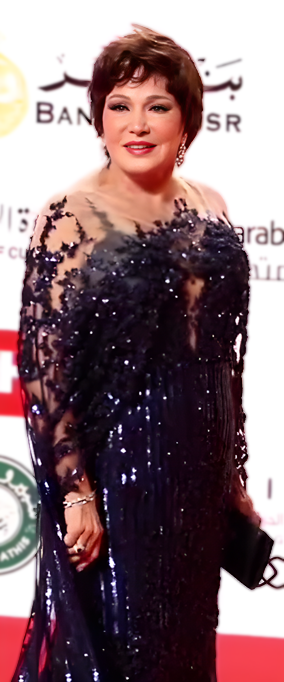
- Lebleba at the 45th CIFF, 2024
- Born: Ninochka Manoug Kupelian; November 14, 1946 (age 79); Cairo, Kingdom of Egypt
- Occupation: Actress
- Years active: 1950–present
- Spouse: Hassan Youssef (m. 1964; div. 1972)
- Relatives: Nelly (cousin); Feyrouz (cousin)

Ninochka Manoug Kupelian (Arabic: نينوتشكا مانوج كوبليان; Armenian: Նինոչկա Մանուկ Կուպելյան; born November 14, 1946), better known by stage name Lebleba (Arabic: لبلبه, pronounced [lebˈlebæ]), is an Egyptian actress.

Her legacy as an actress has become firmly established within Egyptian culture, with her career contributing significantly to the development of Egyptian cinema. Through her work, she has influenced numerous artists and helped broaden the representation and role of women in the entertainment industry.

== Life and career ==
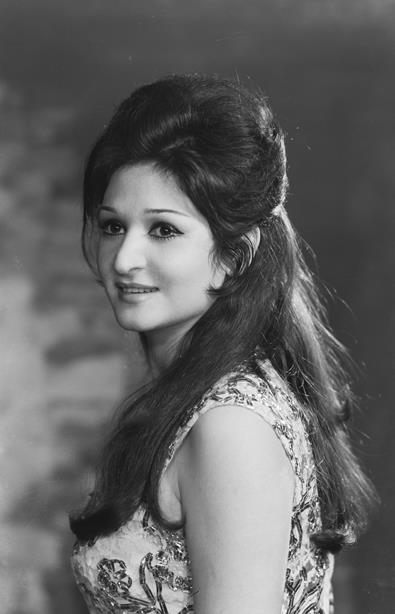
Young Lebleba

She was born in Cairo to an Armenian-Egyptian family. She started as a child actress imitating other actresses, including appearances on the Egyptian National Theater promoted by Muallem Sadiq.

Lebleba was given her stage name when director Niazy Mustafa and screenwriter Abul Seoud El-Ebiary cast her as a child in ‘‘Habibti Sousou’’ (’‘My Love Sousou’’, 1951). The following year, she starred opposite Hussein Sedki in ‘‘Al-Bayt Al-Said’’ (’‘The Happy Home’’, 1952). Her major breakthrough came after producer, director, and actor Anwar Wagdy attended her performance of ‘‘Adwaa Al-Madina’’ (’‘City Lights’’) in Alexandria while disguised to avoid recognition. Impressed by her performance, he later cast her in his successful 1954 film ‘‘Arba’ Banat wi Zabett’’ (’‘Four Girls and an Officer’’).

As her film career developed, Lebleba continued performing celebrity impressions and became so popular that legendary singer Abdel-Halim Hafez reportedly requested that she perform on stage immediately before his appearances.

In the 1970s, she acted alongside leading man Salah Zulfikar in Borg El-Athraa (1970) and Fi Saif Lazim Nohib (1974). She also acted alongside Ahmed Zaki in Ma'ali al Wazir (2003).

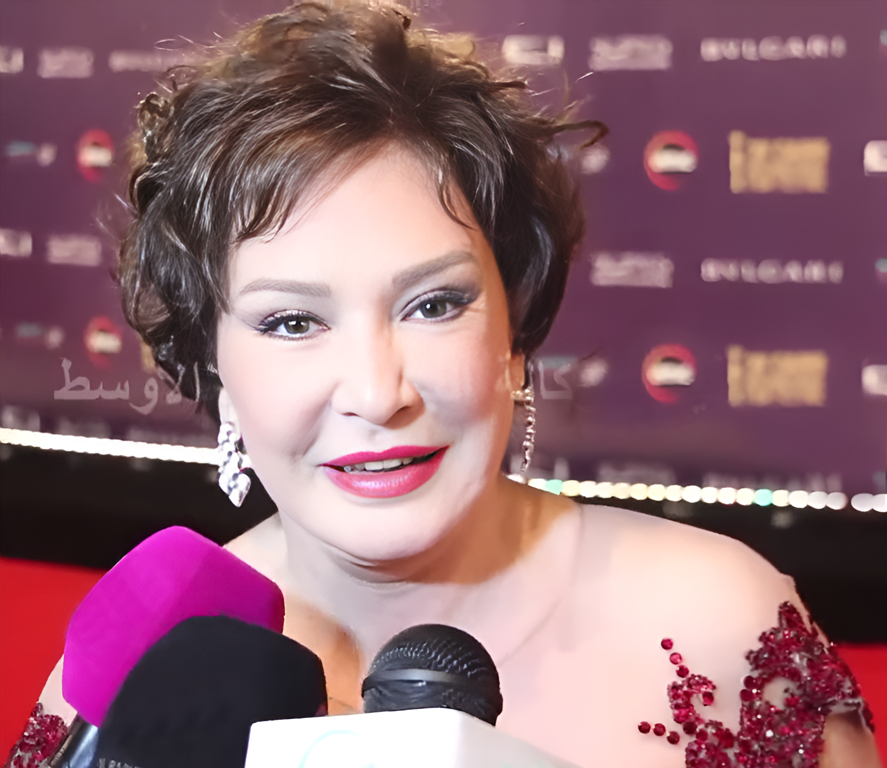
Lebleba attending the Cairo International Film Festival in 2017

She acted alongside leading actors Omar Sharif and Adel Imam in Hassan and Marcus (2008). In the 1990s, Lebleba worked alongside leading man Nour El-Sherif in Lela Sakhena (1995), in which she earned Best Actress award at the National Film Festival, among other honors. She married actor Hassan Youssef, but they divorced. She never remarried.

== Awards ==
She received several Best Actress awards, most notably at the Arab Film Biennale, organized by the Arab World Institute (IMA) in Paris, for her performance in Atef al-Tayeb’s ‘‘Laila Sakhina’’ (’‘Hot Night’’) in 1996. That same year, she also won a Best Actress award at the “All Africa” Festival in Cape Town for the same film.

In 2022, The Cairo International Film Festival (CIFF) honored renowned actress Lebleba with its prestigious Lifetime Achievement Award during the festival’s 44th edition, held from 13 to 22 November. The award recognized her extensive career, which began when she was a child, and her contributions to Egyptian cinema through numerous memorable films, television dramas, and entertainment performances. She described the award as a dream for every Egyptian actor and expressed her happiness at being honored on the festival’s stage.

== Other ventures ==
Lebleba has also been involved in philanthropic work, supporting various charitable causes over the years, particularly those related to education, healthcare, and the preservation of culture. Her commitment to helping her community has contributed to the respect and admiration she receives beyond her career in entertainment.

== Filmography ==
- Al Beit Al Said
- Kadi Gharam
- Rehla Shahr Al Asal
- Habibti Soo Soo
- Arba3 Banat We Zabet
- Borj El-Athraa
- Al Nagham Al Hazeen
- Al Milionair AL Mouzayaf
- AL Habib AL Maghool
- Agaza Bel Afia
- Bent Badi3a
- Al Banat Wel Hob
- Al Banat Wel Marcedes
- Al Sokareya
- Ya Zalemni
- Shei2 Men Al Hob
- Aris AL Hana
- Ehtares Men Al Regal Ya Mama
- Hekayti Maa Al Zaman
- Fi El Seif Lazem Neheb
- Emraa Bala 2Alb
- Hob Fo2 Al Bourkan
- Al Sheyateen Fi Agaza
- 3aga2eb Ya Zaman
- 24 Sa3a Hob
- Mouled Ya Donia
- AL Kadeia Al Mashhoura
- Bezour Al Sheytan
- Al Hesab Ya Madmouazel
- Bos Shouf Sokar Beta3mel Eih
- Ragol Fi Segn Al Nesa2
- Moughameroon Hawl Al 3alam
- Eli Dehek Ala Al Sheytan
- Al Gana Taht Kadamayha
- AL Ba3d Yazhab Lel Ma2zoun Maratein
- Esabet Hamada We Tootoo
- Arba3a Etnin Arba3a 4-2-4
- Setouhi Fawk Al Shagara
- AL Kadab We shabou
- Ehtares Men Al Khot
- Lahib El Entekam
- Ehna Betou3 AL Esa3af
- Al Mokhber
- Emraa Taht El Ekhtebar
- Enohom Yasrekoun Al Araneb
- Lak Youm Ya Beih
- Mehatet LA Ens
- Awlad El Esoul
- Giran Akher Zaman
- Sheytan Men 3asal
- Bokra Ahla Men Al Neharda
- Al Sheytana Alati Ahabatni
- Leyla Sakhena
- Ded Al Hekouma
- Ganat Al Shayateen
- Al Akhar
- Al Na3ama Wel Tawous
- Ma'ali al Wazir
- Booha
- 3aris Men Geha Amneya
- Wesh Egram
- Eskenderia New York
- Hassan wa Morcus
- Nathariat Amti
- Al Fil Al Azraq
- Villa 69
