= Strange Colours =

- DVD cover
- Directed by: Alena Lodkina
- Starring: Kate Cheel; Daniel P. Jones; Justin Courtin
- Distributed by: Bonsai Films
- Release date: 2017
- Country: Australia
- Language: English

Strange Colours is a 2017 Australian film set in the opal-mining town of Lightning Ridge, New South Wales. It was directed by Alena Lodkina.

== Plot ==
A young woman, Milena, visits her estranged father Max, an opal miner who is in hospital, apparently dying.

== Cast ==
- Kate Cheel
- Daniel P. Jones
- Justin Courtin

== Production ==
Strange Colours was shot with financial assistance from the Venice Biennale College Cinema fund. It was filmed in Lightning Ridge, New South Wales.

The director was Russian-born Alena Lodkina, who is based in Melbourne. It is her debut feature film as director.

== Release ==
The film premiered at the 2017 Venice International Film Festival, and was subsequently screened at the 2018 Sydney Film Festival, followed by screenings at the Brisbane International Film Festival and the Melbourne International Film Festival.

The film has been released on DVD by Bonsai Films.

== Awards and nominations ==
Strange Colours was nominated for the inaugural AACTA Award for Best Indie Film in the 8th edition of the AACTA Awards.
