= Hail (2011 film) =

2011 Australian film

- Directed by: Amiel Courtin-Wilson
- Written by: Amiel Courtin-Wilson
- Starring: Daniel P. Jones
- Cinematography: Germain McMicking
- Edited by: Peter Sciberras
- Music by: Steve Benwell
- Release date: 2011
- Country: Australia
- Language: English

Hail is a 2011 Australian drama film written and directed by Amiel Courtin-Wilson, in his narrative feature debut.

The film premiered at the 68th edition of the Venice Film Festival.

== Cast ==
- Daniel P. Jones as Daniel
- Leanne Letch as Leanne
- Tony Markulin as Tony
- Jerome Velinsky as Jerome

== Production ==
The film was produced by Flood Projects and funded by Screen Australia, Film Victoria and the Adelaide Film Festival. It features Daniel P. Jones, an ex-convict who had previously appeared in Courtin-Wilson's documentary short Cicada, and her partner Leanne Letch playing fictionalized versions of themselves.

== Release ==
The film premiered at the 68th Venice International Film Festival, in the Horizons competition. It was distributed domestically by Madman Entertainment.

== Reception ==
On the review aggregator website Rotten Tomatoes, 71% of 10 critics' reviews are positive, with an average rating of 6.4/10.

The Age's critic Philippa Hawker described the film as "singular and striking", noting it "has an extreme sense of documentary fidelity but it is intercut with a kind of hallucinatory, over-reaching, vivid excess: it's a fierce, sometimes harrowing combination of the real and the surreal, the visceral and the abstract." Richard Kuipers wrote on Variety: "pic boasts a relatively conventional storyline peppered with heavy verbal violence, trippy visual metaphors and a cacophonous soundtrack that mark it as a strictly outre item for dedicated arthouse buffs". Film critic Megan Lehmann described the film as "dissonant and brutal, but also unexpectedly tender", "a risky piece of experimental cinema" that "melds coarse reality, extreme close-ups, nightmarish montages [...] and a soundtrack that’s alternately jarring and lovely".

The film ranked third in The Guardian's list of the best Australian films of the 2010s.
