= Kalinka (film) =

- Theatrical release poster
- Directed by: Vincent Garenq
- Written by: Vincent Garenq; Julien Rappeneau
- Produced by: Hugo Bergson-Vuillaume; Cyril Colbeau-Justin; Jean-Baptiste Dupont
- Starring: Daniel Auteuil; Sebastian Koch; Marie-Josée Croze
- Cinematography: Renaud Chassaing
- Edited by: Valérie Deseine
- Music by: Nicolas Errèra
- Production companies: LGM Productions; Black Mask Productions; StudioCanal; TF1 Films Production
- Distributed by: StudioCanal
- Release date: 16 March 2016 (France)
- Running time: 86 minutes
- Countries: France; Germany
- Language: French
- Budget: $8.6 million
- Box office: $1.1 million

Kalinka (French: Au nom de ma fille) (released on home video and VOD as In Her Name) is a 2016 French-German drama film directed by Vincent Garenq. The film is based on the true story of the Kalinka Bamberski case which took place in 1982. The film was released on 16 March 2016.

== Plot ==
In the summer of 1982, 14-year-old Kalinka Bamberski died at her stepfather's house in Germany, where she was staying for the holidays of her boarding school. When the case was closed by the German authorities without a real explanation as to how the teenager died, her French biological father, André Bamberski, became certain that her stepfather, a German doctor, was involved in her death. He spent the next 30 years fighting for the truth, pressuring both French and German authorities into investigating further.

== Cast ==
- Daniel Auteuil as André Bamberski
- Marie-Josée Croze as Dany
- Sebastian Koch as Dieter Krombach
- Christelle Cornil as Cécile
- Lilas-Rose Gilberti as Kalinka (6-year-old)
- Emma Besson as Kalinka (14-year-old)
- Christian Kmiotek as Robert
- Serge Feuillard as Maître Gibault
- Fred Personne as Bamberski's Father
