= Nino Russo =

Italian film director, screenwriter and playwright (1939–2026)

Nino Russo (14 April 1939 – 11 April 2026) was an Italian stage and film director, screenwriter and playwright. He died on 11 April 2026, at the age of 86.
