= Kalinka Bamberski case =

French-German court case

- Court: European Court of Human Rights
- Decided: March 2018

Case history
- Appealed from: French and German courts

Kalinka Bamberski, a French teenager, was killed in 1982 in the house of her German stepfather, Dieter Krombach, a serial rapist and former physician. Suspicious autopsy results caused the girl's French father André Bamberski to pressure German authorities into investigating Krombach's involvement in the death.

When Germany closed the case and denied extradition to France, Krombach was tried in absentia in France and convicted of involuntary manslaughter in 1995, a verdict later overturned by the European Court of Human Rights on procedural grounds. In 2009, Bamberski had Krombach abducted in Germany and driven to France. Krombach stood trial there, was convicted in 2011 of having caused intentional bodily harm resulting in unintentional death, and was sentenced to 15 years in prison. The European Court of Human Rights upheld the verdict on appeal in 2018. A French court gave Bamberski a one-year suspended sentence for the abduction. The Kalinka Bamberski case caused considerable publicity as it raised issues of French–German relations and vigilante justice.

== Family background ==
André Bamberski was born in France around 1938; his father's family had come from Poland. During World War II, the Germans took him to Germany and Poland. In the early 1970s, André Bamberski worked as an accountant. With his wife Danièle Gonnin and their two children, they lived in Casablanca, Morocco, where they met Dieter Krombach (born 1935) and his second wife; Krombach's first wife had died suddenly at age 24. Krombach worked at the German consulate as a doctor and was a cardiologist. Krombach and Gonnin began a secret affair and eventually left their spouses; they married in 1977. Bamberski's children eventually went to live with the Krombachs in Lindau, Germany.

== Death of Kalinka Bamberski and investigation in Germany ==
Kalinka Bamberski, a healthy and athletic 14-year-old girl, was attending a French-language boarding school in Germany in 1982. She spent the summer vacation at the home of her mother and her stepfather in Lindau. Krombach stated that on the evening of 9 July 1982 right after dinner he injected her with Kobalt-Ferrlecit, a cobalt-iron preparation that he liked to use on several family members and friends. Initially he said it was intended to aid in tanning, later he contradicted himself and claimed it was intended to treat anemia. He said that he told her to switch off the light at midnight and found her dead in her room in the morning. He administered various injections intended to revive her, and he then called emergency services. He later said that he also had given her a sleeping pill that night.

The autopsy, conducted two days later, could not establish a cause of death. Among the findings were aspirated stomach contents in the airway and lungs, undigested contents in the stomach, several injection marks, a superficial vaginal tear (judged to have occurred after death), fresh bloody stains around the genitals, and a whitish substance in the vagina; the substance was not tested. The genitals were removed and have been missing ever since.

The prosecutor declined to open a case. Once André Bamberski had obtained a copy of the autopsy report, he pressed for another investigation. Additional investigations were ordered in Germany and found that the Kobalt-Ferrlecit injection must have happened very close to Kalinka's death and that Kobalt-Ferrlecit is a dangerous drug that could cause an adverse reaction, but it would do so immediately after injection, not several hours later. The undigested stomach contents pointed to a death soon after a meal; the aspirated stomach contents in the lungs pointed to a death during coma or anesthesia. The expert concluded that the timeline given by Krombach was not convincing and that it was more likely that an injection right after dinner had caused circulatory failure, unconsciousness, vomiting, and death.

In 1983, Bamberski distributed leaflets in Lindau accusing Krombach of the rape and murder of his daughter. Krombach sued for defamation and received a judgement of 500,000 German marks, which Bamberski refused to pay. Bamberski hired well-known German lawyer Rolf Bossi to press for a trial against Krombach. The case ended before the Oberlandesgericht (Higher Regional Court) in Munich in 1987 with a finding that there was insufficient evidence to prove that Krombach's injection negligently or intentionally caused the girl's death.

== First trial in France ==
Kalinka's body had been interred in Toulouse and was exhumed in 1985. The genitals could not be found and no new analyses could be performed. An evaluation by French doctors was ordered, which pointed to the poor quality of the original toxicological analyses and concluded that the injection site at the right arm occurred close to death, not several hours before.

In 1995, following intense lobbying by Bamberski, Krombach was tried in France in absentia and received a sentence of 15 years in prison for "intentionally afflicting of bodily harm which caused unintentional death". In 2000, a police officer on a train in western Austria recognized Krombach from a photo distributed by Bamberski and arrested him. Krombach spent three weeks in jail before an Austrian judge accepted his attorney's argument that the trial in France had been illegal and had him released. The French verdict was annulled in 2001 by the European Court of Human Rights, which censured France because Krombach had not been able to defend himself; Krombach received compensation of 100,000 francs.

== Convictions of Krombach in Germany and further allegations ==
In the 1970s, Krombach had been investigated in Germany because he was suspected of having killed his wife with an injection. No charges were filed.

In a trial in Germany in 1997, Krombach admitted having drugged a 16-year-old patient and raped her in his medical office. He received a two-year suspended sentence and lost his medical license. Several other victims came forward, but the cases were not pursued for lack of physical evidence. In 2006, he was sentenced to 28 months in prison for having practiced medicine without a license. After serving 11 months in prison, he was released and the remainder of the sentence was suspended.

The 2006 German TV documentary Kalinkas letzte Reise (Kalinka's Final Journey) contains an interview with two teenage sisters who say they were befriended by Krombach, injected with iron cobalt, and raped.

== Abduction to France, conviction of Krombach, and further proceedings ==
A German court declined the French authorities' extradition request of Krombach in 2004, stating that the case was closed. Bamberski, concerned that the statute of limitations would run out in 2012, paid several men to abduct Krombach and deliver him to French authorities. On 17 October 2009, Krombach, by then 74 years old, was beaten up by three men in his home town of Scheidegg, Bavaria, and driven to Mulhouse, France, where he was left chained to a fence near the police station. He suffered a fractured skull. Bamberski was soon arrested with €19,000, the amount that he intended to pay the kidnappers; he was released on bail. Germany demanded Krombach's return to Germany and the extradition of Bamberski and the perpetrators, but France refused.

Krombach was imprisoned in France and a new trial was scheduled for 2011. Testimony of a German woman came to light, who said she had had an affair with Krombach when she was 16 years old; Krombach would drug his wife during their encounters. Several women testified at trial that Krombach had sexually abused them as teenagers, always using cobalt-iron injections. On 22 October 2011, Krombach was sentenced to 15 years in prison for causing intentional bodily harm resulting in unintentional death. The prosecutors believed that Krombach had drugged Kalinka in order to rape her. The verdict was confirmed on appeal in December 2012. Krombach's lawyer immediately vowed to appeal further to the Court of Cassation, but the appeal was rejected on 2 April 2014.

Krombach appealed to the European Court of Human Rights, claiming that he had been prosecuted twice for the same crime. The Court rejected the appeal in March 2018, holding that the independent prosecutions in Germany and France were not ruled out by the European Convention on Human Rights. In 2016, a court in Melun ordered Krombach's release for health reasons, but the prosecution's appeal was successful and he remained imprisoned. He was eventually released from prison in February 2020 for health reasons, and he died on 12 September 2020 in an old-age home in Germany.

== Case against Bamberski ==
Germany's demand to have Bamberski extradited to stand trial for the kidnapping was rejected in 2011 by a court in Toulouse with the argument that Bamberski would be tried in France. Bamberski's trial for the kidnapping took place on 22–23 May 2014. He confessed that he had agreed to have Krombach abducted. He was given a one-year suspended jail sentence.

== Films ==
- The 2006 German TV documentary Kalinkas letzte Reise deals with the case.
- The 2016 French-German drama film Kalinka (Au nom de ma fille, "In the Name of My Daughter"; released on home video and on-demand as In Her Name) is based on the case.
- The 2022 Netflix documentary My Daughter's Killer, a French true crime-documentary film about the case directed by Antoine Tassin.

== See also ==
- List of kidnappings (2000–2009)
- Marianne Bachmeier – German mother (1950–1996)
