= Yuri Leiderman =

Yuri Leiderman (born in 1963, Odesa, Ukraine) is an artist and writer, one of the Moscow Conceptualists. He participated in apartment exhibitions in Moscow and Odesa since 1982. He graduated from the Moscow Institute of Chemical Technology named after D. Mendeleyev in 1987. He was one of the founding members of the "Medical Hermeneutics" group in 1987, leaving the group in 1990. He was awarded the Andrei Belyi literature prize in 2005. He was a member of the groups "Kapiton" and "Corbusier", 2008–2010. He was a participant in the 68th Venice International Film Festival. He resides and works in Berlin.

== Participation in biennale ==
- Biennale Venedig 1993 und 2002
- Manifesta 1 1996 in Rotterdam
- Biennale of Sydney 1998
- 50th Venice Biennial in 2003
- Shanghai Biennale 2004
