= Baby Love (2008 film) =

- French: Comme les autres
- Directed by: Vincent Garenq
- Written by: Vincent Garenq
- Produced by: Christophe Rossignon
- Starring: Lambert Wilson; Pilar López de Ayala; Pascal Elbé
- Cinematography: Jean-Claude Larrieu
- Music by: Laurent Levesque; Loïc Dury
- Production company: Nord-Ouest Films
- Release date: 13 June 2008 (CFF)
- Running time: 96 minutes
- Country: France
- Language: French

Baby Love (French: Comme les autres) is a 2008 French comedy film directed and written by Vincent Garenq starring Lambert Wilson, Pilar López de Ayala and Pascal Elbé.

== Cast ==
- Lambert Wilson - Le docteur Emmanuel François Xavier Bernier
- Pilar López de Ayala - Josefina Maria Paredes
- Pascal Elbé - Philippe
- Anne Brochet - Cathy
- Andrée Damant - Suzanne
- Florence Darel - Isa
- Marc Duret - Marc

== Plot ==
Emmanuel is in a relationship with Phillippe. However, Emmanuel wants to become a dad and submits the paperwork required for couples to start the process of adoption. Phillippe is not keen on the idea of parenthood, wishing for a life of fun, dinners, and parties. His decision is also influenced by his queerness which at the time, was viewed in negative light by society. Emmanuel.proceeds with the process of adoption and before the social worker pays him in a visit, he attempts to remove any indication of queerness as well as of his relationship with Phillippe from his apartment. However, during the visit, the social worker stumbles upon a picture of Phillippe and Emmanuel kissing and immediately rejects his application for adoption.

Phillippe and Emmanuel had previously crashed into Fina's car. She is an immigrant from Argentina who has been having issues with her immigration status in France. After several, unsuccessful rounds of meeting with other queer couples looking to adopt or have children, Emmanuel contacts Fina, inviting her to dinner. She believes it to be a date until he admits to her that he is gay and asks her to have his child in exchange for a fake marriage which will guarantee that she can stay in France legally. She throws her wine in his face.

However, upon being arrested, Fina calls Emmanuel, after claiming that he is her fiancé to the police. He agrees to let her stay at his place for as long as she needs. Realizing how shaky her immigration status is, she agrees to Emmanuel's deal: They will get married so she can become a permanent resident of France, she will carry his child and once the child is born, they'll get divorced and go their separate ways. Emmanuel undergoes several rounds of medical tests to start the first few rounds of insemination but is told by his friend Cathy — who is a gynaecologist — that he is sterile and cannot have children. Fina comforts him, and the camera pans to a scene picturing Fina holding Emmanuel who is lying down on the floor in a fetus position with his nephew. Emmanuel finally resorts to asking Phillippe for his sperm for the insemination process.

Having announced that she is pregnant to Emmanuel, Fina asks if she can sleep in her room one night. They have sex. The next morning, Emmanuel goes to Phillippe's place and upon returning home, he tells Fina that this cannot happen again. Fina is heartbroken during the wedding since the gay man she's in love with has rejected her. In the meanwhile, Emmanuel and Phillippe rekindle their relationship. Aggravated by this turn of events, Fina admits to Emmanuel that she is in love with him and runs away. Months later, Emmanuel and Phillippe are meeting with other queer couples to restart the process of getting a child of their own when they get a call from Fina. She is at the hospital, delivering the baby. Despite Emmanuel asking Fina to come back home with him and Phillippe, she refuses, choosing to once again to part ways with them.

During dinner with Cathy, Emmanuel and Phillippe ask her to be their child's godmother and Cathy suddenly bursts into tears, displaying very negative feelings regarding homosexuality and parenthood. She claims it is unfair that she hasn't had the chance to have children while two gay men get to experience parenthood. Cathy decides to get started with the process of adoption and opens up to the social worker, stating that she never had the chance to think about having children since she's been single for a while. During the house tour, the social worker closes the door behind them. It is unsure whether the act is consensual or not.

Wishing for Fina to be part of their child's life, Emmanuel and Phillippe find her at her workplace, waiting outside. Once she notices them with the baby, Fina smiles. showing no discontentment at the surprise visit.

== Reception ==
Isabelle Regnier from Le Monde, while praising the believable and sympathetic portrayal of a gay couple and the comprehensive depiction of social issues such as surrogacy and gay adoption, found the film "average" and noted that it resembles more a standard American romantic comedy than a French film. Jordan Mintzer from Variety Wrote "Uppity perf by Wilson adds plenty of sugar to the brew, and it’s contrasted nicely by Elbe’s commanding stoicism as the main character’s boyfriend. Spanish thesp Lopez De Ayala’s convincing turn as an immigrant caught among friendly but domineering interests is another plus" The Hollywood Reporter wrote that "Although the photography of Paris is fairly stock, the film is well-paced. Everyone pretty much gets what he or she wants by the end of the story, and while the triumphs are too easily earned, the actors and characters are so engaging that we don’t begrudge them their bliss"

Mirito Torreiro of Fotogramas rated the film with 3 out of 5 stars. He deemed the film's screenplay to be better than its making, ultimately considering however that, TV-movie looks notwithstanding, it is enjoyable to watch.

== See also ==
- List of French films of 2008
