= Giorgio Pressburger =

Italian writer

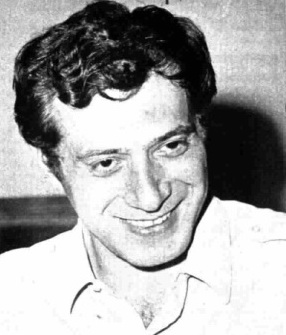
Pressburger in 1975

Giorgio Pressburger (born Pressburger György; 21 April 1937 – 5 October 2017) was an Italian writer of novels and short stories.

Born in Budapest to Hungarian Jewish parents and saved from the Holocaust by Giorgio Perlasca, Pressburger settled in Italy in 1956, where he worked as a film and theatre director. He later became the Director of the Institute of Italian Culture in Hungary. His book The Law of White Spaces was shortlisted for the Independent Foreign Fiction Award in 1992. His other works include the novel Teeth and Spies and the short story collection Snow and Guilt.
