= Mohamed Hefzy =

Egyptian film producer

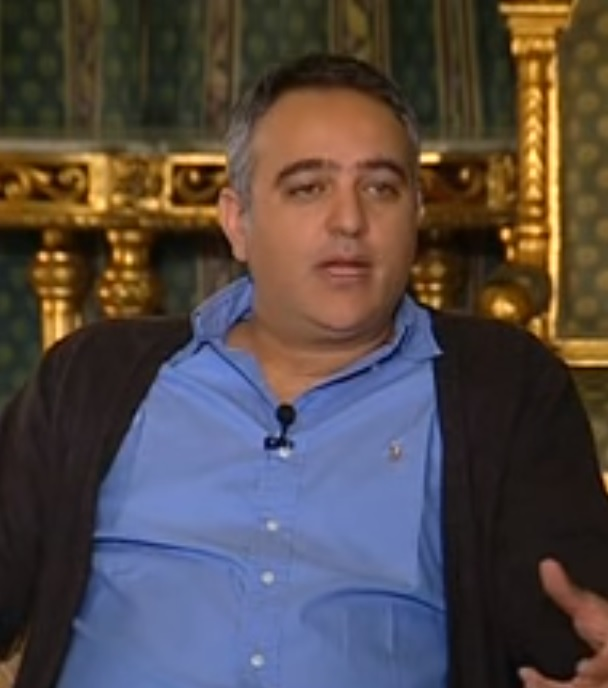
- Mohamed Hefzy, is an Egyptian film producer and screenwriter.
- Born: Cairo, Egypt
- Occupations: Film producer, screenwriter
- Years active: 2005–present

Mohamed Hefzy is an Egyptian film producer and screenwriter. He is known for producing the 2024 drama film Seeking Haven for Mr. Rambo, and as an influential figure in Arab cinema.

== Early life and education ==
Mohamed Hefzy was born in Cairo, Egypt.

Before entering cinema, he studied metallurgical engineering in London.

== Career ==
Hefzy is a film producer and screenwriter.

is the founder of the production company Film Clinic, which he established in 2005. Through the company, he offered workshops and training programs for Arabian and African film people cooperating with international organizations and institutes. In 2010, he became one of the jury members at the Cairo International Film Festival. Then in 2011, he became a jury member of Abu Dhabi Film Festival and then became a jury member at the Venice International Film Festival in 2018. From 2015 to 2017, Hefzy worked as the director of the Ismailia International Film Festival for Documentaries and Shorts, as well as on the advisory board of Cairo International Film Festival. Since 2013, he has been a board member of the Egyptian Chamber of Cinema.

In 2016, he produced the film Clash. The film was later selected as the opening film of the 'Un Certain Regard' section of Cannes International Film Festival. In 2018, he worked as the co-producer of the film Yomeddine. The film was also selected to screen at Cannes in the official competition. In 2020, he produced the film Luxor which competed at the World Dramatic Competition at Sundance Film Festival. In the meantime, his co-production, Souad, entered official selection at the first virtual edition of Cannes Film Festival, which became his third entry into Cannes.

In March 2018, he became the youngest president in the history of the Cairo International Film Festival, when Hefzy was assigned by the minister of culture. In the same year, he won the Arab Cinema Center's "Arab Cinema Personality of the Year", presented by The Hollywood Reporter, for his contribution to the world cinema. Later in June 2019, he was invited as a member of the Academy of Motion Picture Arts and Sciences in the Producers branch.

Hefzy was selected as a jury member for the 2022 International Emmy Awards.

== Recognition ==
Hefzy is regarded as one of the leading film producers in the Middle East and Africa. Screen International named him as the only Arab among 30 future leaders in film production in 2013.

In 2016, he was chosen by Variety on top of a list of "Ten names you need to know in the Arab Film Industry" and included him in the Variety 500.

== Partial filmography ==
Year	Film	Role	Genre	Ref.
2014	From A to B	Producer	Film	
2020	Luxor	Producer	Film	
2020	New Year	Producer	Film	
2020	Bloodline	Producer	Film	
2020	Paranormal	Producer	TV series	
2020	Souad	Producer	Film	
2024	Seeking Haven for Mr. Rambo	Producer	Film	
