= Souad (film) =

2020 film

- Film poster
- Directed by: Ayten Amin
- Release date: 2020
- Running time: 90 minutes
- Country: Egypt
- Language: Egyptian Arabic
- Box office: $ 10 637

Souad (Arabic: سعاد, romanized: Suʾād) is a 2020 Egyptian drama film directed by Ayten Amin. It was selected to be shown at the 2020 Cannes Film Festival. It was selected as the Egyptian entry for the Best International Feature Film at the 94th Academy Awards.

== Plot ==
In Zagazig, a teenage girl experiences a conflict between her social media use and the constraints of traditional religion.

== See also ==
- List of submissions to the 94th Academy Awards for Best International Feature Film
- List of Egyptian submissions for the Academy Award for Best International Feature Film
