= Ayten Amin =

Egyptian film director

- Born: Ayten Amin; 1978 (age 47–48); Alexandria, Egypt
- Education: American University in Cairo
- Occupations: Filmmaker, Director, Screenwriter
- Years active: 2005-present
- Notable work: Souad, Villa 69, Tahrir 2011: The Good, the Bad, and the Politician

Ayten Amin (Arabic: آيتن أمين) is an Egyptian film director, writer, and producer. She began her career making documentary films during the Egyptian Revolution of 2011 and is best known for Souad, Villa 69, and Tahrir 2011: The Good, the Bad, and the Politician

== Early life ==
Amin was born in Alexandria, Egypt. Her debut was in 2005, when she made short films about belly dancing, and the Egyptian actress Madiha Kamel. Amin studied film criticism at the American University in Cairo, where she directed and produced the film Her Man (راجلها), which was screened in 10 international film festivals. Amin began working as an assistant director in 2008. Her breakout was in 2011 with Spring 89, which was shown at Cannes Film Festival.

== Career ==
Amin was in the streets of Cairo during the protests of January 25 as well as the Egyptian Revolution, and her interest in the protests prompted her filming them, and co-directing Tahrir 2011: The Good, the Bad, and the Politician in 2011: with her contribution to the film being "the Bad." This film catapulted her career, allowing her to create Villa 69, and gain notable roles in writing, and producing. Amin then went on to direct the critically acclaimed television series Sabe' Gar, in collaboration with filmmakers Heba Yousry and Nadine Khan. Amin's social drama Souad, which premiered at the 2021 Tribeca Film Festival, was included in The Guardian's 50 Best Films of 2021 in the UK and represented Egypt in the 94th Academy Awards. Amin, along with Hassan Esasam and Ahmed Ismail, wrote Al Shanab; a comedy film. Amin went on to direct the project, and the film was released in 2023.

== Reception ==
As a filmmaker, her contribution to Tahrir 2011: The Good, the Bad, and the Politician was viewed as unique, but nothing extraordinary, in that the proponents of the Mubarak regime she interviewed fell within their expected role, and were predictable. The series Sabe' Gar brought a great deal of praise from critics, due to its refreshingly candid depiction of Egyptian society. Amin also received a widely positive response for her film Souad, which she both wrote and directed.

== Personal life ==
Amin is a Muslim. Her relationship status is unknown.
