= Amiel Courtin-Wilson =

Australian film director

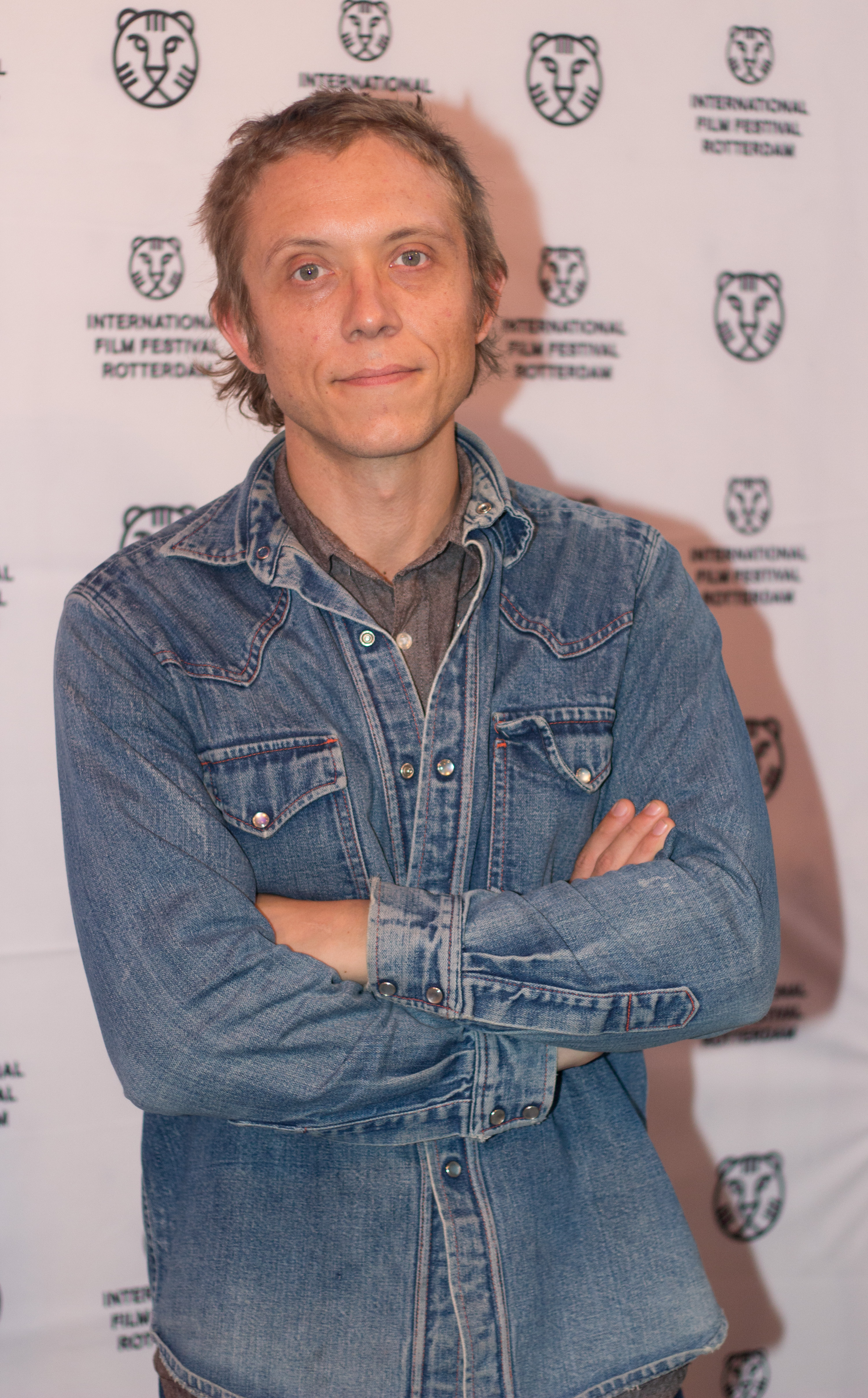
- Amiel Coutin-Wilson at the 2017 International Film Festival Rotterdam
- Born: Melbourne

Amiel Courtin-Wilson is an Australian filmmaker. He has directed over 20 short films and several feature films. His debut feature film, Hail, premiered internationally at Venice Film Festival in 2011. He is also a musician, music producer, and visual artist.

== Early life and education ==
Amiel Courtin-Wilson was born and raised in Melbourne. His parents Peter Wilson and Polly Courtin are both artists.

He made his first film at age nine years old, and attended Elwood College, a state secondary school, from 1992 to 1997.

== Career ==
At the age of 17, Courtin-Wilson won the Longford Nova Award at the 1996 St Kilda Film Festival for his co-directed half-hour documentary Almost 18. At 19, Courtin-Wilson wrote, directed and produced his debut feature documentary Chasing Buddha, about his aunt Robina Courtin, a Buddhist nun. The film premiered at Sundance Film Festival in 2000 and won best documentary at the IF Awards and the Sydney Film Festival.

Since the beginning of his career Courtin-Wilson has been involved in the Australian arts, directing work for Opera Australia and Chunky Move, screening his films at the National Gallery of Victoria and Art Gallery of New South Wales and exhibiting as a visual artist. Courtin-Wilson's co-directed documentary Islands, about second-generation Samoan Australians, premiered at the Museum of Natural History, New York.

Courtin-Wilson has contributed to national and international film and art magazines and has lectured at universities across Australia as well as overseas. In 2008 Amiel formed a Melbourne-based production entity called Flood Projects, with the aim of fostering "collectivist and artist-driven film making practice in Australia".

Courtin-Wilson's second feature documentary, Bastardy, about Indigenous actor and then petty burglar Jack Charles, was released in Australia in 2009. The film won Best Documentary Jury Prize at the 2009 Film Critics Circle of Australia Awards, Best Documentary at the ATOM Awards and was nominated for three AACTA Awards.

In 2012 Courtin-Wilson directed film sequences that featured in the East Timorese theatre production Doku Rai. Doku Rai premiered at Darwin and Adelaide Festivals before being shown at Brisbane Festival the same year.

Courtin-Wilson co-directed the 2013 film Ruin with Michael Cody. Ruin was selected for the Venice Film Festival, where it won a Special Jury Prize.

Courtin-Wilson directed The Silent Eye (2016), which premiered at the Whitney Museum in 2016 and screened at several film festivals and museums. In the same year, Courtin-Wilson exhibited his moving-image work Charles at the National Portrait Gallery in Canberra. The work won the annual Award for Digital Portraiture.

In 2020 Courtin-Wilson created a moving-image work called Burn, as well as a feature-length film Eden Eden Eden at 50 about the novel by French author Pierre Guyotat.

His feature documentary Man on Earth is due for release in 2023, following its world premiere at Sheffield DocFest, along with his feature-length thermal imaging documentary Traces.

== Selected films ==
=== Chasing Buddha (2000) ===
Amiel’s debut feature documentary film Chasing Buddha follows Australian ex-Catholic, ex-political activist and feminist Robina Courtin. The film premiered internationally at the 2000 Sundance Film Festival and was in competition at the Sydney Film Festival, AFI Awards and the Singapore International Film Festival. It earned good reviews.

=== Bastardy (2008) ===
Bastardy (2008) is a feature documentary following the Australian Aboriginal actor Jack Charles, filmed over a period of seven years. The film won the Grand Jury Prize at the 2010 FIFO (film festival) and Best Documentary at the Film Critics Circle of Australia in 2009. It was selected at several film festivals worldwide, including Sydney, Melbourne, Kyiv International Film Festival, and Singapore International Film Festivals.

=== Hail (2011) ===
Courtin-Wilson's narrative feature film debut Hail premiered internationally at the 2011 Venice Film Festival. The film explores the relationship between ex-prisoner Daniel P. Jones and his long-term partner Leanne Letch. It screened at over 30 festivals around the world, including Rotterdam, Istanbul Film Festival, Karlovy Vary and Munich. It won several awards, including the Sequence Jury Prize for Best International Feature at Fantasia International Film Festival, and The Age Critics Award for Best Australian Feature Film at the Melbourne International Film Festival. Hail was also listed in The Guardian as one of the top ten Australian films of the decade.

=== Ruin (2013) ===
Ruin (2013) is a narrative feature film co-directed by Courtin-Wilson, with Michael Cody. It won the Special Jury Prize at the 2013 Venice Film Festival, best cinematography at the Moscow International Film Festival, Best Editing at the Asia-Pacific Film Festival, Best Film at the Sopot International Film Festival in 2015, and Best Direction at the 2014 Fantaspoa International Fantastic Film Festival.

=== The Silent Eye (2016) ===
The Silent Eye (2016) is a feature-length documentary feature film that charts the delicate collaboration between free jazz pioneer Cecil Taylor and Butoh performer Min Tanaka over three days in Taylor's Brooklyn home. The Silent Eye was commissioned by the Whitney Museum of American Art and curated by Jay Sanders and Lawrence Kumpf. The Wall Street Journal wrote the work "savors a glimmering quality, observing what looks like a private ritual".

=== Man on Earth (2022) ===
Man on Earth (2022) is a feature documentary film following Bob, a 65-year-old man who has decided to end his life due to Parkinson's disease. It premiered at the 2022 Sheffield DocFest, where it was listed as one of the Audience Top 10 films. The film was also selected for the 2022 Melbourne International Film Festival and Cork International Film Festival.

=== Warm Blood (2022) ===
Warm Blood (2022) is a narrative feature film directed by Rick Charnoski co-written and produced by Amiel Courtin-Wilson. Warm Blood is set in the underbelly on 1980s Modesto, California and uses the real-life diary of a teenage runaway named Red returning home to find her father. Shot on 16mm by Christopher Blauvelt, Warm Blood is a politically subversive, raw, searing collage of sound, narrative, documentary, and trash B movie meta-narratives, which paints an evocative portrait of an underseen American underclass.

== Awards and nominations ==
Won

- 2000 Sydney Film Festival – winner, Rouben Mamoulian Award for Chasing Buddha
- 2000 Sydney Film Festival – winner, Dendy Award Best Documentary for Chasing Buddha
- 2000 IF Awards – winner, Best Australian Documentary, Nominated Best Director for Chasing Buddha
- 2009 St Kilda Film Festival – winner, SBS Television Award for Cicada
- 2009 Australian Film Critics Circle – winner, Best Documentary Jury Prize for Bastardy
- 2009 ATOM Awards – winner, Best Documentary Human Story for Bastardy
- 2010 FIFO International Documentary Film Festival – winner, Grand Jury Prize for Bastardy
- 2012 Fantasia International Film Festival – winner, Sequence Jury Prize Best International for Hail
- 2012 Melbourne International Film Festival – winner, Age Critics Award Best Australian Feature for Hail
- 2015 Australian Academy of Cinema and Television Arts (AACTA) awards – winner, Byron Kennedy Award for outstanding creative enterprise in film and television
- 2018 Harlem International Film Festival – winner, Best Experimental Film

Nominations

- 2009 Australian Film Institute Awards – nominated, Best Documentary, Best Direction, Best Editing for Bastardy
- 2009 Sydney Film Festival – nominated, Best Documentary for Bastardy
- 2009 Asia Pacific Awards – nominated, Best Documentary for Bastardy
- 2017 Australian Academy of Cinema and Television Arts (AACTA) awards – nominated, Best Indie Film AACTA Award
- 2017 Film Critics Circle of Australia – nominated, Best Film
- 2017 Australian Film Critics Association – nominated, Best Film

== Art ==
Courtin-Wilson is a member of Badfaith, a virtual reality collective of video artists.

Tag (2004) was exhibited at Australian Centre for the Moving Image and National Gallery of Victoria as part of the major exhibition 2004: AUSTRALIAN CULTURE NOW, a landmark national survey which showcased new work by more than 130 leading and emerging Australian artists.

Pash (2005) is a 16mm single-screen projection curated by Alexie Glass and Sarah Tutton, which was part of the 2005 exhibition I THOUGHT I KNEW BUT I WAS WRONG, an exploration of the impact of video art on Australian contemporary art over the previous five years. Other contributing artists include Patricia Piccinini, Tracey Moffatt and Shaun Gladwell.

Like Trying to Coax A Lion Out of My Chest (2009) is a solo exhibition consisting of drawings and mixed media work. The images, originally in five years of journal entries, are enlarged on the walls of the Utopian Slumps Gallery.

Death of a King (2014) is a single-screen installation curated by Joel Stern and Danni Zuvela as part of the Yoko Ono retrospective Yoko Ono: WAR IS OVER at the Museum of Contemporary Art Australia. Death of a King is a response to the Yoko Ono Film Script No. 4 Ask the Audience to Stare at the Screen Until It Becomes Black.

The American Experiment (2015) is a solo exhibition curated by Gertrude Contemporary Art Spaces. Representing a collection of expanded fragments assembled over 17 years of filmmaking in the US, the exhibition comprises moving image installation, audio recordings and diagrammatic endeavours to find new graphic representations of cinematic structure.

A single-channel video installation, Charles (2016) is an immersive portrait of a homeless man living on the streets of Oklahoma City. Charles won the Australian National Portrait Gallery's Digital Portraiture Prize.

Breaking Waves (2016) is a two-channel video installation commissioned by the Melbourne International Arts Festival and exhibited at Ian Potter Museum of Art.

Under the Wire (2016) is a three-channel video installation as part of a group exhibition at the Monash University Museum of Art commissioned by the Melbourne International Arts Festival. Other artists included in the exhibition included Bill Morrison, Rick Charnoski and Peter Knight.

The Silent Eye (2016) is a feature-length single-channel work that charts the delicate collaboration between free jazz pioneer Cecil Taylor and Butoh performer Min Tanaka over three days in Taylor's Brooklyn home. The Silent Eye was commissioned by the Whitney Museum of American Art and curated by Jay Sanders and Lawrence Kumpf.

Exquisite Corpse (2018) is a collaborative VR work created by BADFAITH, a VR collective consisting of Courtin-Wilson and Luci Schroder, Shaun Gladwell, video artist Daniel Crooks, Indigenous artist Tony Albert, Samantha Matthews, Natasha Pincus, and writer and futurist Dr Jordan Nguyen.

Eden Eden Eden at 50 (2020) is a contribution to an international project celebrating the 50th anniversary of Pierre Guyotat’s eponymous 1970 text Eden Eden Eden. The project included a new film by Courtin Wilson in Melbourne, a reading by Philippe Parreno in Berlin, and a concert by Scott McCulloch in Tbilisi.

== Filmography ==
=== Feature fiction ===
- Carnation (2023) writer, director, producer, editor
- Friends and Strangers (2021) executive producer
- Strange Colours (2017) executive producer
- Ruin (2013) co-writer, co-director, co-producer (with Michael Cody)
- Hail (2011) writer, director, producer, co-editor

=== Feature documentary ===
- Man on Earth (2022) director, producer, editor
- Eden Eden Eden at 50 (2020) director, producer
- The Silent Eye (2016) director, producer, editor
- Ben Lee: Catch My Disease (2011) director, cinematographer, producer, editor
- Bastardy (2009) writer, director, producer, cinematographer
- Chasing Buddha (2000) writer, director, producer

=== Short films ===
- Grace (2020)
- Tag (2010)
- Cicada (2009 short documentary)
- On the Other Ocean (2006)
- Adolescent (2003)
- Stranglefilm (2001)
- & It’s POLITIkAL (2001 short documentary)
- Melbourne 2:36AM (2001)
- Persona in the Home (2001 short documentary)
- Islands (2000 short documentary)
- Re:constitution (2000 short documentary)
- Cosmonaut (1998)
- Mix Master Mike – Live (1998 music clip)
- Living with Mental Illness (1998)
- Avalanches ‘Rolling High’ (1997 music clip)
- Bubble Choke Squeak (1997)
- Charlie’s Toy Meets Madeline Moritz (1995)
- Numb (1995)

=== Collaborations ===
Executive Producer

- Friends and Strangers (2021)
- Strange Colours (2017)
