= Tusi Tamasese =

Samoan New Zealander film director (born 1975)

Tusi Tamasese (born in 1975 or 1976 in Samoa) is a Samoan New Zealander film director.

He is of high chiefly descent, of the Tupua Tamasese lineage.

He came to New Zealand at the age of 18 with the intention to go to university, but, lacking a scholarship, began by working "picking tomatoes". He eventually did study at the New Zealand Film School, at the International Institute of Modern Letters at Victoria University of Wellington and at the University of Waikato; he obtained a bachelor's degree in social sciences, and a Master of Arts degree in creative writing. The feature film script that Tamasese wrote for his MA degree won the Embassy Trust Award and Dominion Post Award. He lives in Wellington.

He wrote and directed his first short film, Va Tapuia (Sacred Spaces), which was "screened at the 2010 NZ Film Festival and then at festivals around the world". He went on to make Samoa's first ever feature film, The Orator (O Le Tulafale), which was screened in 2011 and submitted to the 84th Academy Awards. It was funded by the New Zealand Film Commission and the Samoan government. He described it as "my image of what I see of growing up in Samoa".

Tamasese received the New Generation award from the Art Foundation in 2015.

One Thousand Ropes was released in 2017, directed by Tusi Tamasese, produced by Catherine Fitzgerald. It is the story of a father and daughter relationship in Samoa, in Samoan and English, mixing reality and mythological narratives. It was the Panorama Special at the Berlin Film Festival.

In 2023 he released Freedom Fighter, a film inspired by New Zealand's racist Dawn Raids against the Pasifika community.

In July 2026 he was invited to join the Academy of Motion Picture Arts and Sciences.
