= Guilty (2011 film) =

2011 film

- Film poster
- French: Présumé coupable
- Directed by: Vincent Garenq
- Written by: Hubert Delarue; Serge Frydman; Vincent Garenq
- Produced by: Christophe Rossignon
- Starring: Philippe Torreton; Noémie Lvovsky
- Cinematography: Renaud Chassaing
- Edited by: Dorian Rigal-Ansous
- Release date: 7 September 2011
- Running time: 102 minutes
- Country: France
- Language: French
- Budget: $6.1 million
- Box office: $3 million

Guilty (French: Présumé coupable, lit. 'Presumed guilty') is a 2011 French drama film directed by Vincent Garenq about the Outreau trial. Garenq was nominated for the 2012 Best Adaptation César Award and Philippe Torreton was nominated as Best Actor.

== Synopsis ==
The movie tells the story of Alain Marécaux, one of the defendants of the Outreau case. Arrested in November 2001 along with 13 other people, wrongly accused of acts of pedophilia, he had spent 23 months in jail. He was forced to give up his training to be a court bailiff, his wife left him and he had been separated from his children before finally being acquitted in December 2005. His mom had let herself die of sadness (of hunger) during the first months of his imprisonment. He had made many suicide attempts and went on a hunger strike and was nearly close to death at the time of his release. Ten years later, he has partially rebuilt himself: a new wife, a new study... but never succeeded in recreating true bonds with his children.

== Cast ==
- Philippe Torreton as Alain Marécaux
- Wladimir Yordanoff as Maître Hubert Delarue
- Noémie Lvovsky as Edith Marécaux
- Raphaël Ferret as judge Burgaud
- Michelle Goddet (credited as Michèle Goddet) as Thessy, Alain's sister
- Farida Ouchani as Myriam Badaoui
- Olivier Claverie as the prosecutor
- Jean-Pierre Bagot as Alain's father
- Sarah Lecarpentier as Aurélie Grenon
- Kevin Tholliez as Thomas Marécaux
- Loris Rouah as Sébastien Marécaux
- Charlotte Ghristi as Cécilé Marécaux
