= Rossi (surname) =

Rossi ([ˈrossi]) is an Italian surname, said to be the most common surname in Italy. Due to the diaspora, it is also very common in other countries such as Argentina, Brazil, Canada, France, Switzerland, the United States and Uruguay. Rossi is the plural of Rosso (meaning "red-haired" in Italian).

== Variations ==
Some variations derived from regional traditions and dialects. Other variations derived from medieval scribes spelling names based on how they sounded instead of how they were actually spelt. Recorded variations (in alphabetical order): De Rossi, De Rubeis, De Russi, De Russo, Del Rossi, Del Rosso, Della Rossa, DeRossi, Di Rosso, Di Russo, La Russa, Larussa, Lo Russo, Lorusso, Rossa, Rossato, Rosselini, Rosselino, Rosselli, Rossello, Rossetti, Rossetto, Rossillo, Rossini, Rossit, Rossitti, Rossitto, Rosso, Rossoni, Rossotto, Roussini, Rubiu, Ruggiu, Ruiu, Ruju, Russa, Russello, Russetti, Russi, Russiani, Russino, Russo, and Russotti.

== Geographical distribution ==
=== Number by country ===
Rank	Country	number
1	Italy	347,433
2	Brazil	63,342
3	United States	36,659
4	Argentina	34,476
5	France	19,046
6	Switzerland	4,773
7	Canada	3,432
8	Finland	2,588
9	Uruguay	2,572
10	England	2,314

As of 2014, 63.2% of all known bearers of the surname Rossi were residents of Italy (frequency 1:176), 13.2% of Brazil (1:2,807), 6.7% of the United States (1:9,854), 6.3% of Argentina (1:1,240) and 3.5% of France (1:3,492).

In Italy, the frequency of the surname was higher than the national average (1:176) in the following regions:

1. Liguria (1:87)
2. Umbria (1:92)
3. Tuscany (1:96)
4. Emilia-Romagna (1:98)
5. Marche (1:115)
6. Lombardy (1:116)
7. Lazio (1:122)
8. Veneto (1:172)

In Argentina, the frequency of the surname was higher than the national average (1:1,240) in the following provinces:

1. Santa Fe Province (1:672)
2. Buenos Aires (1:850)
3. Córdoba Province (1:888)
4. Buenos Aires Province (1:1,026)
5. La Pampa Province (1:1,038)
6. Entre Ríos Province (1:1,233)

In Uruguay, the frequency of the surname was higher than the national average (1:1,333) in the following departments:

1. Salto (1:555)
2. Colonia (1:621)
3. Durazno (1:914)
4. Montevideo (1:1,133)
5. Canelones (1:1,171)
6. Paysandú (1:1,244)

In Finland, the frequency of the surname was higher than the national average (1:2,251) in the following regions:

1. Central Finland (1:503)
2. South Karelia (1:794)
3. Southern Savonia (1:1,144)
4. Kymenlaakso (1:1,315)
5. Northern Savonia (1:1,595)
6. Päijänne Tavastia (1:1,949)

In Brazil, the frequency of the surname was higher than the national average (1:2,807) in the following states:

1. São Paulo (1:1,173)
2. Paraná (1:1,757)
3. Santa Catarina (1:1,815)
4. Espírito Santo (1:1,855)
5. Rio Grande do Sul (1:1,891)

== Notable people ==
=== A ===
- Aaron Rossi (1980–2025), American musician
- Adolfo Rossi (1857–1921), Italian journalist, writer and diplomat
- Agnes Rossi (born 1959), American writer
- Agustín Rossi (born 1959), Argentine politician
- Agustín Rossi (footballer) (born 1995), Argentine footballer
- Aldo Rossi (1931–1997), Italian architect and designer
- Alessandro Rossi (disambiguation), several people
- Alessandro Pesenti-Rossi (1942–2026), Italian racing driver
- Alexander Rossi (disambiguation), several people
- Alexandre Pongrácz Rossi, Brazilian zootechnician and TV presenter
- Alfredo Rossi (1906–1986), Italian pianist
- Anacristina Rossi (born 1952), Costa Rican author
- Anafesto Rossi (1883–1933), Italian opera singer
- Andrea Rossi (disambiguation), several people
- Andrew Rossi, American filmmaker
- Ángel Sixto Rossi (born 1958), Argentine Catholic archbishop
- Angela Carlozzi Rossi (1901–1977), American social worker
- Angelo Joseph Rossi (1878–1948), American politician from San Francisco
- Anthony T. Rossi (1900–1993), American founder of Tropicana Products
- Antonio Rossi (born 1968), Italian canoer
- Antonio Rossi (painter) (1700–1773), Italian painter
- Antonio Anastasio Rossi (1864–1948), Italian Catholic prelate
- Assunta De Rossi (born 1983), Italian-Filipina actress
- Azariah dei Rossi (1511–1578), Italian physician and scholar

=== B ===
- Bruno Rossi (1905–1993), Italian physicist

=== C ===
- Camila Rossi (born 1999), Brazilian rhythmic gymnast
- Carlo Rossi (disambiguation), several people
- Carlos Rossi (born 1949), Argentine politician
- Chantal Rossi, Canadian politician
- Charles Rossi RA (1762–1839), English sculptor

=== D ===
- Daniel Rossi (disambiguation), several people
- Dino Rossi, American politician from Washington

=== E ===
- Enrico Rossi (disambiguation), several people
- Enrico Rossi Chauvenet (born 1984), Italian footballer
- Ernesto Rossi (disambiguation), several people

=== F ===
- Francesca Rossi (born 1962), Italian computer scientist
- Francesca Rossi (basketball) (born 1968)
- Francis Rossi (born 1949), British singer, guitarist and songwriter, member of Status Quo
- Francisco Rossi (born 1940), Brazilian politician from Osasco

=== G ===
- Gaetano Rossi (1774–1855), writer and opera librettist
- George Rossi (1960–2022), Scottish actor
- Gian Maria Rossi (born 1986), Italian footballer
- Giorgia Rossi (born 1987) Italian journalist
- Giovanni Rossi (1926–1983), Swiss bicycle racer
- Giuseppe Rossi (born 1987), Italian-American footballer
- Graziano Rossi (born 1954), Italian motorcycle racer

=== H ===
- Hugh Rossi (1927–2020), British politician
- Hugo Rossi (born 1935), American mathematician

=== I ===
- Ítalo Rossi (1931–2011), Brazilian actor
- Iván Rossi (born 1993), Argentine footballer

=== J ===
- Javier Rossi (born 1982), Argentine footballer
- Jorge Rossi Chavarría (1922–2006), Costa Rican politician

=== K ===
- Kim Rossi Stuart (born 1969), Italian actor, director

=== L ===
- Lemme Rossi (died 1673), Italian music theorist
- Len Rossi (1930–2020), American wrestler
- Liane Marcia Rossi, Brazilian chemist
- Louis Rossi (born 1989), French motorcycle racer
- Lucas Rossi (born 1985), Argentine field hockey player
- Lucas Rossi (canoeist) (born 1994), Argentine slalom canoeist
- Luigi Rossi (ca. 1597–1653), Italian composer
- Luigi Felice Rossi (1805–1863), Italian composer
- Lukas Rossi (born 1976), Canadian rock musician and lead singer of Rock Star Supernova

=== M ===
- Marcelo Rossi (born 1967), Brazilian Catholic priest
- Marco Rossi (disambiguation), several people
- Maria Veronica Rossi (born 1988), Italian politician
- Mariarosaria Rossi (born 1972), Italian senator
- Mario Rossi (1897–1961), Italian architect
- Mario Rossi (1902–1992), Italian conductor
- Matías Rossi (born 1984), Argentine racing driver
- Maurizio Rossi (disambiguation), several people
- Melissa Rossi (born 1965), American journalist
- Michaël Rossi (born 1988), French racing driver
- Michelangelo Rossi (1601–1656), Italian composer

=== N ===
- Néstor Rossi (1925–2007), Argentine football player and manager
- Nicholas Rossi (born 1987), aka Nicholas Alahverdian
- Nicola Rossi-Lemeni (1920–1991), bass opera singer

=== O ===
- Oscar Rossi (1930–2012), Argentine footballer

=== P ===
- Pablo Rossi (born 1992), Argentine footballer
- Paolo Rossi (1956–2020), Italian footballer
- Paul-Louis Rossi (1933–2025), French critic and poet
- Pellegrino Luigi Odoardo Rossi (1787–1848), Italian economist, politician and jurist
- Peter H. Rossi (1921–2006), American sociologist
- Pietro Rossi (disambiguation), several people

=== R ===
- Rachel Rossi (born 1983), American criminal justice lawyer
- Reginaldo Rossi (1944–2013), Brazilian singer
- Richard Rossi (born 1963), American filmmaker, actor, and writer
- Rico Rossi (ice hockey) (born 1965), Canadian-Italian ice hockey coach
- Rosa Diletta Rossi (born 1988), Italian actress

=== S ===
- Salamone Rossi (ca. 1570–1630), Italian violinist and composer
- Sebastiano Rossi (born 1964), Italian footballer
- Semino Rossi (born 1962), Argentine-Austrian schlager singer
- Sergio Rossi (1935–2020), Italian fashion designer
- Shorty Rossi (born 1969), star of the Animal Planet show Pit Boss
- Simone Rossi (born 1968), Italian businessman
- Steve Rossi (1932–2014), stage name of Joseph Charles Michael Tafarella (1932–2014), American stand-up comedian

=== T ===
- Teofilo Rossi (1865–1927), Italian lawyer and politician
- Teofilo Rossi di Montelera (1902–1991), Italian bobsleigher
- Theo Rossi (born 1975), American actor
- Tino Rossi (1907–1983), Corsican singer and actor
- Tony Rossi (baseball) (born 1943), American baseball coach
- Tullio Rossi (1948–2025), Italian cyclist

=== V ===
- Valentino Rossi (born 1979), Italian motorcycle racer
- Valeria Rossi (born 1969), Italian singer-songwriter
- Vasco Rossi (born 1952), Italian singer-songwriter
- Víctor Rossi (born 1943), Uruguayan politician
- Viktor Rossi (born 1968), Swiss politician
- Vittorio Rossi (1865–1938), Italian philologist and literary historian
- Vittorio Luciano Rossi (born 1961), Canadian playwright, actor, and screenwriter

=== W ===
- Walter Rossi (sound editor) (1894–1978), sound editor

=== Y ===
- Youssef Rossi (born 1973), Moroccan football player

== Fictional characters ==
- David Rossi, one of the main protagonists of the crime drama Criminal Minds
- Lila Rossi, a character from the television series Miraculous: Tales of Ladybug & Cat Noir
- Giovanni "Gio" Rossi, a character from the television series Ugly Betty
- Marco Rossi (Metal Slug), a protagonist of the Metal Slug video game series
- Marco Rossi (3000 Leagues in Search of Mother), the main character in 3000 Leagues in Search of Mother
- Michael Rossi, a character from the book Peyton Place
- Mr. Rossi, an Italian cartoon character

== See also ==
- De Rossi
- Rossa (surname)
- Rosso (surname)
- Rossi (disambiguation)
- Ríos (disambiguation)
