= Russo (surname) =

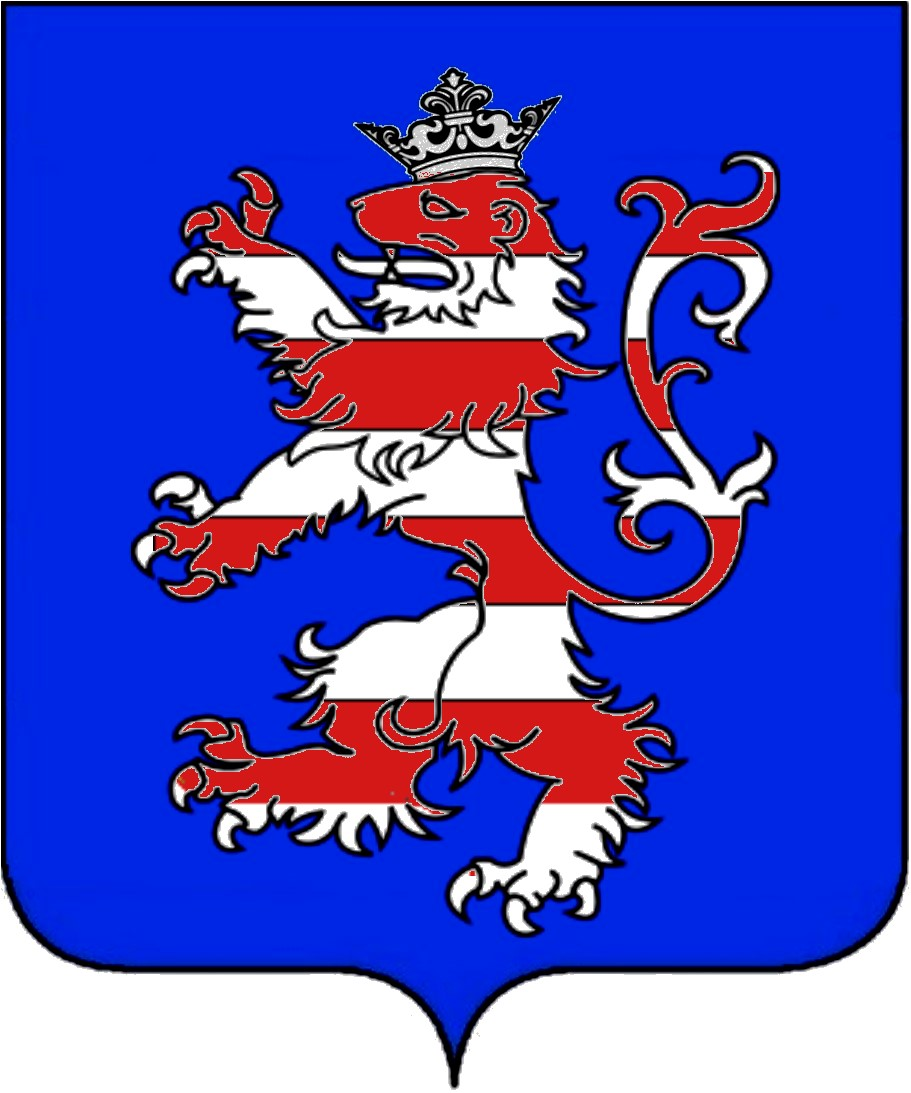
- Coat of arms of Lo Russo family
- Pronunciation: Italian: [ˈrusso] Sicilian: [ˈrʊssʊ]
- Languages: Italian, Neapolitan, Sicilian

Origin
- Language: Latin
- Meaning: "red haired" "russian"
- Region of origin: Southern Italy

Other names
- Alternative spelling: Lorusso; Larussa
- Variant forms: Russi; De Russi; De Russo; Lo Russo; La Russa; Russolillo; Russomanno; Russumando
- Related names: Rossi; Rosso

Russo is a common Southern Italian and Sicilian surname. It is the Southern counterpart of Rossi and comes from a nickname indicating red hair or beard, from russo, russë and russu, from Late Latin russus or rubius, Classical Latin rubeus, "red".

== Geographical distribution ==
As of 2014, 61.5% of all known bearers of the surname Russo were residents of Italy (frequency 1:277), 18.6% of the United States (1:5,429), 5.1% of Argentina (1:2,347), 4.6% of Brazil (1:12,345), 1.1% of France (1:17,406) and 1.0% of Australia (1:6,667).

In Italy, the frequency of the surname was higher than the national average (1:277) in the following regions:

1. Campania (1:72)
2. Sicily (1:123)
3. Calabria (1:155)
4. Apulia (1:205)
5. Basilicata (1:213)

In Argentina, the frequency of the surname was higher than the national average (1:2,347) in the following provinces:

1. Buenos Aires (1:1,034)
2. Buenos Aires Province (1:1,657)

In the United States, the frequency of the surname was higher than the national average (1:5,429) in the following states:

1. Connecticut (1:1,360)
2. Rhode Island (1:1,384)
3. New Jersey (1:1,433)
4. New York (1:1,560)
5. Massachusetts (1:1,920)
6. Florida (1:3,605)
7. Pennsylvania (1:3,637)
8. New Hampshire (1:3,888)
9. Louisiana (1:3,949)
10. Delaware (1:3,981)
11. Nevada (1:4,507)
12. Maine (1:4,594)

In Brazil, the frequency of the surname was higher than the national average (1:12,345) only in one state:

1. São Paulo (1:4,431)

== Notable people named Russo ==
- Aaron Russo (1943–2007), libertarian entertainment businessman
- Adam Russo (born 1983), Canadian/Italian professional ice hockey goaltender
- Adriana Russo (born 1954), Italian actress and television personality
- Adriano Russo (born 1987), Italian footballer who plays as a defender
- Albert Russo (born 1943), Belgian bilingual (English and French) writer
- Alecu Russo (1819–1859), Moldavian Romanian writer, literary critic and publicist
- Alejandro Russo (born 1968), Argentine professional footballer
- Alessandra Russo, professor in Applied Computational Logic
- Alessia Russo (born 1999), English footballer
- Alexander Russo (athlete) (born 1994), Brazilian track and field sprinter
- Alexander Russo (writer), education writer
- Ana Bedran-Russo (née Ana Karina Bedran de Castro), an associate professor in restorative dentistry
- Andrew Russo (born 1975), American pianist
- Andy Russo (born 1948), American college basketball coach
- Angelo Russo (born 1961), Italian actor
- Anna Russo, Italian writer
- Anthony Russo (disambiguation), several people, including:
  - Anthony Russo (American football) (born 1997), American football quarterback
  - Anthony Russo (director) (born 1970), Emmy Award-winning film and television director
  - Anthony Russo (mayor) (1946–2021), the 35th mayor of Hoboken, New Jersey
  - Anthony Russo (mobster) (1916–1979), Genovese crime family figure
  - Anthony Russo (whistleblower) (1936–2008), involved in the Pentagon Papers leak
- Antonino Russo Giusti (1876–1957), Italian dramatist
- Avraam Russo (né Abraham Ipjian in 1969), Syrian-born Russian pop singer of Armenian origin
- Bartolomeo Russo (1866–1941), New Zealand fisherman, horticulturist and farmer
- Basil Russo (born 1946), American attorney, politician of the Democratic Party, and judge
- Bill Russo (1947–2021), American former football coach
- Cailin Russo (born 1993), American model and musician
- Carmen Russo (born 1959) Italian dancer, actress, television personality and singer
- Catherine Allison Russo (born 1976), American healthcare consultant and politician
- Carine Russo (née Collet; born 1962), Belgian politician, member of Ecolo, and author
- Charles-Édouard Russo (born 1980), French professional golfer
- Christopher "Mad Dog" Russo (born 1959), American sports radio host
- Cristian Cuffaro Russo (born 1988), Argentine footballer
- Cindy Russo (born 1952), American women's basketball head coach
- Claudia Russo (born 1983), Italian candidate for Miss World 2008
- Clement Russo (born 1995), French road and cyclo-cross cyclist
- Clemente Russo (born 1982), Italian Boxer
- Daniel Russo (born 1948), French film actor, comedian and director
- Danilo Russo (born 1987), Italian footballer
- Danny Russo (1885–1944), American violinist and big band leader
- Dario Russo, Australian film director, director of the 2025 film The Fox
- Darko Russo (born 1962), Serbian professional basketball coach
- David C. Russo (born 1953), American Republican Party politician
- Deanna Russo (born 1979), American actress
- Eddie Russo (1925–2012), American racecar driver
- Elena Russo (born 1972), Italian actress of cinema, television and theatre
- Erminia Russo (born 1964), Canadian volleyball player
- Evandro Russo Ramos (born 1985), Brazilian footballer
- Federico Russo (born 1997), Italian actor
- Felice Angelo "Felix" Russo (1926–2005), Australian rules footballer
- Ferdinando Russo (1866–1927), Italian journalist and dialect poet from Naples
- Francesco Russo (actor) (born 1993), Italian actor
- Francesco Russo (footballer) (born 1981), Italian footballer
- Francois Russo (born 1966), the creative director and founder of Maison Takuya
- Frederick Dello Russo (born 1943), American politician and funeral director
- George Russo (born 1980), English actor
- Giacomo Russo (1937–1967), Italian racing driver
- Giada Russo (born 1997), Italian figure skater
- Gianni Russo (born 1943), American actor and singer
- Giovanni Russo (or Dovani Roso; born 1972), Croatian-born Israeli former footballer
- Giuni Russo (1951–2004), Italian singer-songwriter
- Giuseppe Russo (born 1983), Italian footballer who plays as a midfielder
- Giuseppe Genco Russo (1893–1976), Italian mafioso
- Gus Russo, American author and researcher of the assassination of John F. Kennedy
- Ignacio Ezequiel Russo (futbolista profesional argentino nacido en el 2000)
- James Russo (born 1953), American film and television actor
- Jamie Russo (born 1981), Australian former professional rugby league footballer
- Jason John Russo (born 1973), American heavy metal singer, songwriter and session recording vocalist
- Jason Sebastian Russo (born 1973), American rock musician and writer
- Jeff Russo (born 1969), American composer and music producer
- Jodean Russo (1932–2010), American actress, wife of Tony Russel and mother of Del Russel
- Joe Russo, including:
  - Joe Russo (director) (born 1971), an Emmy Award-winning film and television director
  - Joe Russo (racing driver) (1901–1934), an American auto racer active in the 1930s
  - Joe Russo (musician) (b. 1976), a jazz/rock and roll drummer
- John Russo, including:
  - John F. Russo (1933–2017), politician from New Jersey
  - John A. Russo (born 1939), American screenwriter and film director
  - John Russo (baseball) (born 1973), baseball coach
- Jonathan Judge-Russo (born 1983), American actor and producer
- José Luis Russo (1958–2026), Uruguayan footballer
- Julee Russo (also known as Julee Rosso), American cook and food writer
- Justin Russo (born 1976), American musician
- Kevin Russo (born 1984), American former professional baseball player
- Kristin Russo (born 1980), American speaker, personality, and LGBTQ activist
- Laura Garcia Moreno Russo (1915–2001), Brazilian librarian
- Luciano Russo (born 1963), Italian prelate of the Catholic Church who works in the diplomatic service of the Holy See
- Lucio Russo (1944–2025), Italian physicist, mathematician and historian of science
- Lucio F. Russo (1912–2004), American lawyer and politician from New York
- Luigi Fontana Russo (1868–1953), Italian economist and lecturer
- Marcella Russo (born 1969), Australian actress
- Marcelo Fabián Méndez Russo (born 1981), Uruguayan former footballer
- Marco Russo (born 1982), Italian footballer
- Margaret Russo (1931–2006), All-American Girls Professional Baseball League player
- Mariné Russo (born 1980), Argentine former field hockey player
- Mario Russo (born 1967), Argentine politician
- Marisabina Russo (née Stark) (born 1950), a children's book author and illustrator
- Marius Russo (1915–2005), American starting pitcher in Major League Baseball
- Martin A. Russo (born 1944), a U.S. Democratic politician and lobbyist
- Matías Russo (born 1985), Argentine racing driver
- Melissa Russo (born 1968), American television journalist
- Meredith Russo (born ca 1986/1987), American young adult and middle grade fiction author
- Michael Dello-Russo (born 1956), Argentine football player and manager
- Michael Russo (disambiguation), several people
- Michele Russo (born 1986), Italian footballer in the role of defender
- Michele Russo (bishop) (1945–2019), Italian Roman Catholic bishop of Doba, Chad
- Miguel Ángel Russo (1956–2025), Argentine football player and manager
- Monette Russo (born 1988), Australian former artistic gymnast
- Nadia Russo-Bossie (1901–1988), a pioneering Romanian aviator
- Nancy Russo (born 1943), American psychologist
- Nat Russo (born 1970), American fantasy fiction author
- Neal Russo (1920–1996), American sportswriter
- Nello Russo (born 1981), Italian former footballer
- Nicholas Russo (1845–1902), Italian priest, philosopher, Boston College president, and church founder
- Nicola Russo (born 1990), Italian football midfielder
- Nino Russo (1939–2026), Italian stage and film director, screenwriter and playwright
- Orazio Russo (1973–2026), Italian football (soccer) player
- Pasquale Russo (born 1947), Italian Camorrista and boss
- Pat Russo (born 1941), American model
- Patricia Russo (born 1952), American businessperson
- Patti Russo (born 1966), American singer, songwriter and actress
- Paul Russo (1914–1976), American racecar driver
- Paul A. Russo (born 1943), American diplomat
- Perry Russo (1941–1995), a key witness in Jim Garrison's investigation of the JFK assassination
- Peter Russo (born 1959), Australian former rules footballer
- Peter Russo (politician) (born 1955), Australian politician
- Pietro Russo (fl. 1507), Sicilian mapmaker
- Philippe Russo (born 1961), French singer-songwriter
- Pietro Paolo Russo (1611–1657), Roman Catholic bishop of Nusco
- Raffaele Russo (born 1999), Italian football player
- Rebecca Russo (born 1992), American-born women's ice hockey player
- Renato Russo (1960–1996), Brazilian singer and songwriter
- Rene Russo (born 1954), American actress, producer and model
- Riccardo Russo (born 1992), Italian motorcycle racer
- Richard Russo (born 1954), American novelist
- Richard Paul Russo, American science fiction writer
- Robbie Russo (born 1993), American ice hockey defenceman
- Roberto Russo (musician) (born 1966), Italian pianist and composer
- Rosa Russo Iervolino (born 1936), Italian politician and former Mayor of Naples
- Russ Russo (born 1975), American film actor
- Ry Russo-Young (born 1981), American filmmaker
- Salvatore Russo (born 1958), Italian Camorrista and boss of the Russo clan
- Salvatore Russo (footballer) (born 1971), Italian former footballer
- Sarina Russo (born 1951), Italian entrepreneur
- Sean Russo (born 1991), Australian swimmer
- Santo J. "Sonny" Russo (1929–2013), American jazz trombonist
- Stefano Russo (footballer, born 1989), Italian footballer
- Stefano Russo (footballer, born 2000), German-Italian footballer
- Tal Russo (born 1959), Israeli general
- Thomas "Thom" Russo, American record producer, engineer, mixer and songwriter
- Tommaso Russo (born 1971), Italian boxer
- Vanessa Rousso (also known as Vanessa Ashley Rousso; born 1983), American professional poker player
- Vince Russo, American author, podcaster, professional wrestling writer and pundit
- Vincenza Carrieri-Russo (born 1984), American model, actress, entrepreneur and beauty pageant titleholder
- Vito Russo (1946–1990), American LGBT activist, film historian and author
- Vittorio Russo (born 1939), Italian football manager and former player
- William Russo (musician) (1928–2003), American composer, arranger, and musician

== Fictional characters ==
- Alex Russo, one of the main characters in the TV Series Wizards of Waverly Place
- Billy Russo, Marvel comic villain
- Blossom Russo, one of the main characters on the TV series Blossom
- Coach Russo, a character from the series The Amazing World of Gumball
- Dominic Russo, one of the main characters on the TV series Chasing Life
- Giada Russo, one of the main characters in the TV Series Wizards Beyond Waverly Place
- Jamie Russo, a character from the series The Amazing World of Gumball
- Jerry Russo, one of the main characters in the TV Series Wizards of Waverly Place
- Justin Russo, one of the main characters in the TV Series Wizards of Waverly Place and Wizards Beyond Waverly Place
- Ladd Russo, one of the main characters in the anime series Baccano!
- Max Russo, one of the main characters in the TV Series Wizards of Waverly Place
- Milo Russo, one of the main characters in the TV Series Wizards Beyond Waverly Place
- Peter Russo, a character on the TV series House of Cards
- Roman Russo, one of the main characters in the TV Series Wizards Beyond Waverly Place
- Theresa Russo, one of the main characters in the TV Series Wizards of Waverly Place
- Tina Russo, one of the main characters in the TV series The Looney Tunes Show

== See also ==
- Russo, Switzerland – place name
- Russo (disambiguation)
- Rossi (surname)
- Ríos (disambiguation)
- Rosso (surname)
