= Oakland gang injunctions =

In 2010, due to escalating gang activity and high crime rates in Oakland, California, the Oakland city attorney's office under John Russo sought gang injunctions in Oakland against multiple gangs, with the first coming into effect in May of that year. A second injunction was sought from 2010 to 2012, with a preliminary injunction approved in June 2011 and the full injunction approved in February 2012. A gang injunction is a court-issued restraining order that prohibits named gang members from participating in a variety of specified activities. The injunctions were controversial, with opponents citing concerns about their high costs and the possibility of civil rights violations, while proponents felt that the city had not adequately supported the injunctions. In 2015, city attorney Barbara Parker dismissed both injunctions.

== Background ==
In February 2010, Oakland city attorney John Russo filed for the city's first gang injunction, proposing a "safety zone" of 100 blocks in North Oakland where suspected members of five gangs would be prohibited from associating with each other and subject to a curfew. The injunctions were supported by Oakland Police Department chief Anthony Batts, who welcomed the injunctions as an additional tool against gangs. The injunction was approved by Alameda County Superior Court judge Robert Freedman in May 2010. Russo stated that up to a dozen additional gang injunctions were being considered. In October, Russo filed a proposal for a second injunction targeting the Fruitvale area. A preliminary injunction against five suspected gang members went into effect in June 2011 and the full injunction against 33 defendants was approved by Freedman in February 2012. In May 2011, the Oakland City Council voted to continue the injunction in North Oakland and continue funding the legal effort to get the Fruitvale injunction approved, but put a moratorium on future gang injunctions subject to council study and approval. In October 2011, the city was considering additional gang injunctions, but no further proposals were filed.

== Controversy ==
Opponents of the injunctions argued that they would lead to increased racial profiling and intimidation of minorities by police. A year into the North Oakland injunction, while drug related arrests were down in the "safety zone", homicides, assaults, and other violent crimes in the zone had increased. By the end of the Fruitvale injunctions in 2015, just 8 of the 40 alleged gang members subject to the injunction had been arrested within the zone. Maintaining the injunctions was also considered costly. By February 2011, $750,000 had been spent by the city in legal fees and additional police wages. By November 2011, policing the injunction zones was estimated to have cost the city $130,000 while legal fees had cost over $1 million.

Proponents of the injunctions accused Oakland Mayor Jean Quan of not supporting the injunctions enough. While Quan publicly supported the injunctions, she also criticized them as being overly ambitious and too broad. In May 2011 John Russo announced his resignation from city attorney, effective in June, in large part due to Quan's lack of support for the injunctions. Russo accused Quan of trying to make him the face of the gang injunctions because he was white instead of police chief Anthony Batts, who is black. After resignation, Russo became the city manager of Alameda. In August, Batts also resigned his position over the perceived lack of support, stating that the city "had not let the chief be the chief". Quan was also accused of having a conflict of interest, as her legal adviser Dan Siegel and his firm Siegel and Yee represented some of the accused gang members targeted by the injunctions. In May 2011, Siegel and Yee were removed from the case by the court due to the potential conflict of interest.

== Legal challenges ==
The defendants of the Fruitvale gang injunction appealed the decision of approval, but in June 2014 California First District Court of Appeal justice Maria Rivera upheld the injunction.

== Dismissal ==
By 2015, Oakland had a new mayor (Libby Schaaf), a new city attorney (Barbara Parker), and a new police chief (Sean Whent). On March 5, Parker announced that she would dismiss the injunctions with the support of Whent, citing changing policies and strategy. The move was cited as part of a greater decline of the use of gang injunctions in California due to strong community criticism and issues of legality.
