= Rossino =

Rossino may refer to:

- Rossino, frazione of Calolziocorte, municipality in the Province of Lecco in the Italian region Lombardy
- Rossino Mantovano, Italian composer of frottole
- Alexander B. Rossino, an American historian and writer

== See also ==
- Rosso (disambiguation)
- Rossini (disambiguation)
