= Giulia Masucci Fava =

Italian painter

Giulia Masucci Fava (born 1858) was an Italian painter; she was active mainly in Naples, and is known primarily for figure and genre painting.

== Biography ==
Fava was born in Serino, Province of Avellino. She studied under direction of the professors Vincenzo Volpe and Enrico Rossi. Among her works were Nel tugurio and Per la sposa, both exhibited at the Promotrice of Naples; Una bambina; and finally Una letterina, exhibited at the Brera Academy in Milan. In 1891, she married the writer Onorato Fava (1859–1941), known mostly for his children's books.
