= Laura Russo =

Laura Russo may refer to:

- Laura Russo (librarian)
- Laura Russo (politician)
