= Enrico Rossi =

Enrico Rossi may refer to:

- Enrico Rossi (beach volleyball) (born 1993), Italian beach volleyball player
- Enrico Rossi (cyclist) (born 1982), Italian road cyclist
- Enrico Rossi (painter) (1856–1916), Italian painter
- Enrico Rossi (politician) (born 1958), Italian politician
- Enrico Rossi Chauvenet (born 1984), Italian footballer
