= Rossini (surname) =

Rossini is an Italian surname. Notable people with the surname include:

- Andrea Rossini (born 1990), Italian footballer (goalkeeper)
- Carolina Rossini, Brazilian-American attorney
- Carl Rossini Diton (1886–1962), American pianist and composer
- Carlo Conti Rossini (1872–1949), Italian orientalist
- Elena Rossini, Italian filmmaker, writer and artist
- Fausto Rossini (born 1978), Italian footballer (forward)
- Gioachino Rossini (1792–1868), Italian composer
- Giuseppe Rossini (born 1986), Italian-Belgian footballer
- Jonathan Rossini, Swiss footballer
- Luigi Rossini (1790–1857), Italian artist
- Márcio Rossini (born 1960), Brazilian former footballer
- Salvatore Rossini (born 1986), Italian volleyball player
- Stefano Rossini (born 1971), Italian footballer
- Stefano Rossini (footballer, born 1991), Italian
- Stéphane Rossini (born 1963), Swiss politician

== See also ==
- Rossi (surname)
- Rossini (disambiguation)
