= John Russo =

John Russo may refer to:

- John Russo (baseball) (born 1973), American college baseball coach
- John A. Russo (born 1939), American screenwriter and film director
- John A. Russo (politician) (born 1959), American city manager in the state of California
- John F. Russo (1933–2017), former American Democratic Party politician from New Jersey
