= Rossi =

Rossi may refer to:

- Rossi (surname)
- Carlo Rossi (wine), a brand of wine produced by the E & J Gallo Winery
- Rossi Codex, 14th century collection of Italian music of the Trecento
- Rossi X-ray Timing Explorer, a satellite
- Rossi (manufacturer), a firearms manufacturer
- Rossi's, an ice cream company in England
- Rossi Boots, an Adelaide work boot manufacturer
- Rossi., British DJ and record producer

== See also ==
- de Rossi
- Ríos (disambiguation)
- Rossie (disambiguation)
- Rossinavi, a shipyard founded by Claudio and Paride Rossi
- Rosso (disambiguation)
- Russo, a surname
- Rossy, a regional chain of variety stores
