= Russo =

Russo may refer to:

- Russo (surname)
- Russo (footballer, 1915–1980), full name Adolpho Milman, Brazilian football forward and manager
- Russo (footballer, born 1976), full name Ricardo Soares Florêncio, Brazilian football defender
- Russo brothers (born 1970 and 1971), American directors, producers and screenwriters
- The Russo Law Firm, American consumer law firm
- Russo-, prefix relating to Russia or the Russians
