= Rossini (disambiguation) =

Gioachino Rossini (1792–1868) was an Italian composer.

Rossini may also refer to:

- Rossini (cocktail), cocktail
- Rossini (film), a 1942 Italian musical drama film
- Rossini (surname), Italian surname

== See also ==
- Rossi (disambiguation)
- Rossino (disambiguation)
