= Gang injunction =

Collective restraining order in US law

A civil gang injunction or CGI is a type of restraining order issued by courts in the United States prohibiting gang members in particular cities from participating in certain specified activities. It is based on the legal theory that gang activity constitutes a public nuisance that can prevent non–gang members of the community from enjoying peace and public order. An injunction is obtained against the gang itself, after which the police and district attorney may decide against whom they will enforce it. Law enforcement use gang injunctions as a tool to label people as gang members and restrict their activities in a defined area (ACLU).

== History ==
The history of gang injunctions began on July 22, 1982, when the Los Angeles City Attorney and the Los Angeles Police Department obtained a temporary restraining order against three named gangs: the Dogtown, Primera Flats, and the 62nd East Coast Crips gangs. Seventy-two members of the three gangs were targeted by police. This was the first gang injunction to sue a street gang as an unincorporated association. The injunction also named individual gang members as defendants. The injunction only had four restrictions, aimed at reducing graffiti, including prohibiting graffiti on private and public property, trespassing on private property with the intent to place graffiti, and an order for the gang to clean up the graffiti that displayed the name of their gang. The injunction also requested that the seventy-two named defendants be required to do five hours of community service to clean up graffiti. While Los Angeles first began using gang injunctions in the 1980s, the first injunction to make headlines was obtained by Los Angeles City Attorney James Hahn against the West Los Angeles–based Playboys Gansta Crips in 1987. The move was hailed as an innovative way for law enforcement to crack down on gangs, allowing people to regain control of their neighborhoods. In 1993, the Los Angeles City Attorney's office filed for another injunction, this time against 55 members of the Blythe Street Locos gang of Panorama City. The American Civil Liberties Union joined other groups in opposing the injunction, arguing that it would effectively outlaw legal activities such as carrying on conversations and possessing tools like pocket knives and screwdrivers, and that it could lead to injustices against people whose identities may have been mistaken. The injunction was issued despite efforts opposing it. It was followed by further injunctions in the cities of San Jose, Burbank, San Diego, Westminster, Pasadena, Redondo Beach, Modesto, and Oxnard.

On October 26, 1987, the Los Angeles City Attorney and the Los Angeles Police filed an injunction against the Playboy Gangster Crips gang. The injunction was a first of its kind in that it contained an array of provisions, never before attempted, aimed at restricting the gang's ability to operate and commit gang-related crimes. The preliminary injunction named twenty-three defendants. The injunction was ultimately limited in scope, as the judge only allowed restrictions that were listed in the penal code as restrictions and struck down the primary law enforcement goal, the no-association provision, which the court deemed inappropriate. The injunction was also the first to name Does, or any other members of the gang not yet identified, to be added at a later date if deemed appropriate by the police.

On October 7, 1992, the Burbank City Attorney and Burbank Police Department sought an injunction against the Barrio Elmwood Rifa gang. The target area consisted of an entire city block that the gang called home. The injunction did not name the gang as a defendant, but it did name thirty-four members of the gang. This was the first injunction to include a no-association clause prohibiting gathering or appearing anywhere in public view with any other defendant anywhere in the target area. The no-association restriction usually contains wording that prohibits the gang members from "standing, sitting, walking, driving, bicycling, gathering or appearing anywhere in public view with any other defendant herein, or with any other known gang member".

In 2010, the State of California surpassed a total of 150 gang injunctions. The historical and legal progression of all California gang injunctions to date may be reviewed in the CRC publication Gang Injunctions and Abatement: Using Civil Remedies to Curb Gang Related Crimes.

=== Effectiveness ===
In March 2011, a study entitled "Evaluation of the Effectiveness of Gang Injunctions in California" was published in the Journal of Criminal Justice Research. It sought to determine whether gang injunctions reduce crime as compared to baseline and matched control areas. Twenty-five gang injunctions from four California counties were evaluated by extracting crime data from court records and police agencies. The control areas—communities with a similar gang problem but no gang injunctions—were matched for similar gang ethnicity, gang size, proximity, and gang activity. Criminological deterrence, association, environmental, and economic theories served as theoretical foundations for the study. Calls for service were evaluated for a period one year before the injunction and one year after the injunction using paired t-tests, which revealed that gang injunctions reduce crime. Calls for service were significantly reduced compared to the baseline and the matched controls. Violent crime calls were found to decrease by 11.6% compared to the baseline, while controls averaged an increase of 0.8%, a net benefit of 12.4%. Less serious calls decreased 15.9% compared to the baseline, while controls averaged a mild increase of 1.6%, a net benefit of 17.5%. Total calls for service decreased 14.1% compared to the baseline, while controls averaged an increase of 2.3%, a net benefit of 16.4%. This study confirmed that gang injunctions can be a beneficial tool if used and implemented correctly and can reduce gang crime in the communities where they are implemented.

Grogger (2002) found that gang injunctions reduce violent crime by 5%–10%. The Los Angeles Grand Jury (2004) found that gang injunctions reduce violent crime by 10% in the target areas. Maxson (2005) found that people living in the Verdugo Flats neighborhood in San Bernardino had less fear of crime following the implementation of the gang injunction evaluated.

However, many studies show that gang injunctions only deter violence for a limited amount of time. Four neighborhoods under the jurisdiction of the Los Angeles Police Department saw a 5%–10% decrease of violent crime after the first year of implication, while Oxnard, California, saw a decrease in homicides over the next three years. However, a separate study of five San Bernardino neighborhoods showed that the imposition of gang injunctions spurred conflicting results. While most neighborhoods experienced immediate benefits of fewer homicides, violent crime, or gang presence following an injunction, the benefits did not persist. Moreover, one of the San Bernardino neighborhoods saw an increase of gang activity immediately post-injunction.

A 1991–96 study by the American Civil Liberties Union on the Blythe Street Gang revealed that violent crime tripled in the months immediately following the issuance. Additionally, Myers has concluded that gang repression leads to increased gang cohesion and police-community tension, as well as dispersion.

Further, while gang injunctions might lead to diminished crime in their specified locations, they can also divert crime into the surrounding areas, as was the case with the Blythe Street Gang. In the months following the institution of the gang injunction, violent crime almost doubled in the surrounding districts. Critics have noted that the 1990s-2000s also saw a generally sharp downturn of violent crime throughout the nation, which many studies reporting decreased crime fail to acknowledge. Thus, simple calculations of before and after statistics may exaggerate the effects of gang injunctions.

Other studies take a more systemic approach to the problems of gangs. As Barajas writes, the gang emerges as a response to social, economic, and political repression experienced by low-income people of color. These studies have claimed that the state functions as a site of violence for particular populations, and the gang can constitute a community through which youth can collectively furnish identity and provide for their social needs. For these reasons, injunctions are severely limited in their capability to bring about lasting social change, since they fail to challenge the preexisting social arrangements from which gangs often emerge.

A 2018 study used the temporary interruption of gang injunctions from 1998 to 2000 due to the Rampart scandal as a natural experiment. The researchers found that gang injunctions reduce total crime by an estimated 5% in the short-term and as much as 18% in the long-term, with larger effects for assaults, 19% in the short-term and 35% in the long-term.

== Long-term impact ==
To follow up on the Maxson (2005) study and numerous media accounts of problems associated with not knowing the long-term impact of gang injunctions, O'Deane (2007) evaluated the six gangs in San Diego County that have had two gang injunctions implemented against them. The method used to update San Diego County gang injunctions requires the filing of a new injunction as the gang evolves over time to keep it up to date and relevant. Over time, gang members die, go to prison, move out of the area, or stop being active gang members. As older members distance themselves from the gang, younger members are typically created, creating the need for continued analysis and updating of the gang injunctions. The O'Deane study evaluated the status of the gang members named in the first injunction to determine what happened to them between the first and second injunctions against their gang. In each of the six cases reviewed, the police officers who obtained the first injunction and second injunctions provided updated data on each named member. They evaluated every member named in the first injunction as part of their investigation to determine if they were still active gang members who were still part of the public nuisance in the target area, potentially requiring their inclusion in the second injunction.

Similar to what happened in Los Angeles has happened in Southern California. According to San Diego County District Attorney on November 25, 1997, one of the low income Latino neighborhoods, identified as Barrio Posole, in San Diego County was the first to have a civil gang injunction served to just under 30 men, since then they have had two other ones, with the most recent in 2011.The Posole gang, the Old Town National City gang, the Lincoln Park Bloods gang, the Westside gang, the Diablos gang, and the Varrio San Marcos gang are the six gangs in San Diego County that have been the subject of two injunctions each or have had their injunction modified or updated. The long-term evaluation of the six injunctions updated in San Diego revealed that many gang members included in injunctions do not stop their criminal activity after being served with the first injunction. This does not come as a surprise to many law enforcement officers, as the gang members selected to be included in injunctions are typically the most active and problematic. By reviewing the six San Diego injunctions, 185 gang members were named in the six original San Diego injunctions. Of those 185 gang members, 49 of them (27%) were added to the second injunction between five and seven years later because they were still active and still part of the nuisance in the target areas, according to police records. The 136 gang members (73%) who were not included in the second injunction were not included for several reasons: 4 were murder victims, 80 were in prison for committing new offenses, and 52 appeared to be non-active and had no recent contacts with law enforcement in their gang's territory. Most had no contacts anywhere in San Diego County. It appeared that 62% of the gang members served with the injunction did not make an effort to change their criminal ways, but 38% did to some degree and had very little or no activity that would support adding them on the second injunction against their gang. The second injunction increased the number of named gang members now impacted by the two injunctions: the combined defendants totaled 486 gang members on the six injunctions. A total of 301 new gang members were added to the second injunctions (535 gang members named in the 12 injunctions; however, 49 individuals were included in both the first and second injunctions against their gang, or 486 individuals in total ). It is apparent that the injunctions against the six gangs did not cause the gangs to cease to exist, and about two-thirds of the members named in the first injunction remained criminals, as evidenced by their arrests and convictions for new crimes after being enjoined.

The findings of this six-injunction review also suggest that the police did not reduce their enforcement efforts against the enjoined gang members, as many of the members named in the first injunctions were rearrested and imprisoned for new felony offenses. This finding supports the position that gang members are typically defiant and tend to continue their criminal activity until being stopped by arrest and incarceration. If the majority of the named gang members commit future crimes, it is difficult to explain how injunctions have a significant impact on crime reduction. Perhaps the threat of being served with an injunction dissuades uninvolved individuals from getting involved, thereby reducing crime. Perhaps the enjoined gang members become increasingly visible targets to police as a result of their inclusion in an injunction, which enhances their chance of rearrest due to the additional presence of police searching for violations of the injunctions. Perhaps those who do not reoffend leave the area, reducing crime in the target areas. Or perhaps those who do reoffend do so less often due to fear of being apprehended, reducing the volume of crimes committed in the target areas.

== Criticism ==
Gang injunctions form the most important aspect of what is called the "suppression model" of anti-gang enforcement. The suppression model was criticized in a 1994 report by the U.S. Department of Justice's Office of Juvenile Justice and Delinquency Prevention, which stated that in communities where suppression is used, alternatives and diversion programs for at-risk youth diminish, and that the labor market is not sufficiently able to absorb undereducated adults who were involved in gangs during their youth. It also stated that while injunctions may be effective in decreasing gang activity in neighborhoods and small towns, they have little effect on gang activity in large cities such as Los Angeles. Gang injunctions have been further criticized as a zero-tolerance policy used to condemn, not rehabilitate, at-risk youth. Under a CGI two friends or even family members cannot walk together to school. These CGI's alienates these victims of the injunction and causes them to lose interest in school and other related activities and potentially dropout of school. Many labeled/ registered gang members are relatives and often married and could be punished for being outside their home together while helping their mother with groceries. Something so minute as to standing in public is the inequalities these men/boys deal with on an everyday basis.

== The Opposition ==
Proponents of CGIs may say that CGIs lower crime but crime as a whole has decreased nationwide prior over the years. And CGIs contribute to mass incarceration. In their report "Gang Wars," Kevin Pranis and Judith Greene examine the literature and conclude that the current preoccupation, caused by moral panics with gangs is a distraction from very real problems of crime and violence that negatively impacts too many communities. Pranis also states that "Gangs do not drive crime rates, and aggressive suppression tactics simply make the situation worse by alienating local residents and trapping youth in the criminal justice system. Experts and researchers have concluded that CGI's are not useful and simply harm our youth.

=== Cost ===
Another criticism of gang injunctions relates to their cost. Gang injunctions constitute increased policing and therefore divert resources that could be used for youth social programs. As Barajas notes, gang injunctions in Oxnard were issued at a time when after-school programs were being underfunded and increasing numbers of children were funneling into gang culture. To date, gang injunctions in Oakland have cost the city over $1 million, while several elementary schools have shut down. Jeff Grogger addressed the issue of cost effectiveness in his research, highlighting how difficult it is to put an exact price tag on a gang injunction. Police and prosecutors do not track the number of hours put into the effort, the salaries and supplies needed to put the case together, and the cost associated with maintaining and prosecuting violations of the order. Gang injunctions are not unlike any other gang enforcement policy. The police do not seek community permission to conduct a wiretap investigation of the local gang that may cost much more than a gang injunction, nor do they request community approval to conduct large-scale gang sweeps that may involve police overtime costs. The police have a budget approved by their city council, as do sheriffs' departments with their county board of supervisors. The police who are trained on suppressing crime make decisions on how to spend their budget based on the community's needs. In communities where gangs are the primary problem, the department can make a decision to seek an injunction and allocate the funds they believe are appropriate to prepare and obtain the injunctions.

Attaching a cost to gang crime can be difficult, as it includes not only easily quantifiable costs, such as the dollar value of damaged property, but also many economic externalities in the form of non-quantifiable, subjective, or indirect costs—for example, pain and trauma endured by victims of violence, depressed home and property values, and disincentives to business owners and entrepreneurs. The National Institute of Justice estimates that out of an overall cost of $655 billion, the financial cost of violent crime alone to American society is over $400 billion a year. Accounting for pain and suffering, as well as reduced quality of life, increases the total to $450 billion each year, or $1,800 per capita. Estimates of the average cost of single instances of a specific crime vary widely depending on the crime: a vehicle theft costs an average of $5,600; a burglary costs $2,300; a serious assault costs $19,000; and a gang murder costs $1 million, after accounting for the investigation, arrest, prosecution, and incarceration of the offender(s) and the pain and suffering, health care, lost income, and/or emotional trauma on the part of the victim(s).

Such estimates play an important part in policy makers' case to the media and to the general public for gang injunctions. The imputed costs of crimes averted as a result of a gang injunction can greatly outweigh the cost of the injunction's enforcement. For example, in the Posole gang injunction case in San Diego, ten murders occurred over the two-year period before the injunction was implemented, whereas no murders occurred during the four years following the implementation and enforcement of the injunction. No other suppression was noted by the Oceanside Police besides the injunction. Assuming that the decline in crime was caused by the gang injunction and that the decline would not have occurred in the injunction's absence, the $20,000 cost of implementing the injunction was significantly less than the expected cost of alternatives, according to estimates by the National Institute of Justice.

=== Legal challenges ===
In 1997, the case of People ex rel Gallo v Carlos Acuna challenged the constitutionality of gang injunctions. Lower courts had held that provisions disallowing gang members to associate with one another violated their first amendment right to free assembly. However, the Supreme Court of California upheld the constitutionality of the provision against association on the grounds that it was not constitutionally vague—it only applied to named gang members and only covered four square blocks—and found that gang activity fell under the definition of a public nuisance. Nonetheless, a dissenting opinion authored by Justice Stanley Mosk warned, "The majority would permit our cities to close off entire neighborhoods to Latino youths who have done nothing more than dress in blue or black clothing or associate with others who do so; they would authorize criminal penalties for ordinary, nondisruptive acts of walking or driving through a residential neighborhood with a relative or a friend."

In addition to limiting public association, many new injunctions include provisions against "otherwise legal behavior" like being outside after dark, possessing various objects, making gang-related hand signals, and wearing gang colors. These later injunctions have been criticized by academics and legal practitioners for violating gang members' due process rights by not naming individual defendants, administering criminal penalties for essentially being guilty by association, and vague wording. Suggested solutions to these problems include implementing procedural safeguards and gang-specific pleadings to protect defendants' due process rights and avoid the "void for vagueness".

Other criticisms include the violation of gang members' civil liberties due to the broad geographic scope of some injunctions. In re Englebrecht upheld an injunction covering one square mile that included some gang members' residences. The 2005 injunction against the Colonia Chiques gang in Oxnard, California, covers 6.6 square miles, or 24% of the city. Scholars have argued that these broad areas heavily burden gang members' liberties and need be narrowly tailored to the conduct that directly facilitates public nuisance. Others have criticized the lack of an exit process to remove one's name from the list—a practice currently only used in San Francisco and Los Angeles—due to the fact that non-gang-affiliated people often end up on injunction lists, as well as the questionable constitutionality of injunctions. While the United States Supreme Court has not directly addressed the constitutionality of injunctions, in 1999 in Chicago v. Morales it upheld the Illinois Supreme Court's ruling that a 1992 anti-"Congregation Ordinance" was unconstitutionally vague, violating due process and arbitrarily restricting personal liberties.

Prosecutors obtain gang injunctions by applying the law of public nuisance to the particular harms caused by criminal street gangs. Since gang injunctions started to be used as a tool more than 25 years ago, several cases have shaped how they are drafted and implemented. These cases all stem from common-law public nuisances that involve some interference with the interests of the community at large, interests that were recognized as rights of the general public entitled to protection. These restrictions have been attacked on numerous constitutional grounds, specifically on the doctrines of vagueness and over breadth, the First Amendment right to free association, the First Amendment right to freedom of expression, and procedural due process. O'Deane (2007) examined the legal issues surrounding gang injunctions and the case law applied to gang injunctions.

Case Law: City of Chicago v. Morales, 119 S.Ct. 1849. (Chicago Anti-Loitering Ordinance). In 1992, the Chicago City Council enacted the Gang Congregation Ordinance, which provided that whenever a police officer observed a person whom he/she reasonably believed to be a criminal street gang member loitering in any public place with one or more other persons, he/she should order all such persons to disperse and remove themselves from the area. Any person who did not promptly obey such an order was in violation of the ordinance. This ordinance was later determined to be unconstitutional, and some compare this case to the use of gang injunctions still today. The major difference is that the comparison is between a civil lawsuit and a city ordinance, which are two different things. The Illinois Supreme Court concluded that the ordinance violated due process of law because it was unconstitutionally vague and lent itself to arbitrary enforcement. Because the ordinance failed to give the ordinary citizen adequate notice of what was forbidden and permitted, it was impermissibly vague. The term "loiter" may have a common and accepted meaning, but the ordinance's definition of that term, "to remain in any one place with no apparent purpose", did not. This vagueness on the definition of loitering is what led to the rejection of the ordinance. The Illinois Supreme Court concluded that the ordinance did not provide sufficiently specific limits on the enforcement discretion of the police to meet constitutional standards for definiteness and clarity.

Case Law: People v. Gonzalez, 910 P.2d 1366 (Cal. 1996). This case stems from the Blythe Street gang injunction. Defendant Jessie Gonzales, also known as "Speedy", fought his case to the California Supreme Court after he was arrested when he tossed a bottle of beer, ran from police, and forced his way inside a house to evade police without the homeowner's permission. Gonzalez claimed that because the injunction violation case against him was filed in a municipal court and the injunction was obtained in Superior Court, the defendant did not have an opportunity for proper relief (People v. Gonzalez, 910 P.2d 1366 Cal. 1996). Gonzalez was found guilty of violating the injunction. The conviction was used as a test case to challenge the validity of the controversial gang injunctions. Gonzalez denied being a gang member and argued that a municipal court judge did not have jurisdiction to review an order issued by a Superior Court judge. The Court of Appeal held that all criminal cases filed for violations of 166.4(a) PC must be filed directly in Superior Court. The state Supreme Court overruled the Appeal Courts decision and held that a municipal court judge does have "some limited right of review" over an order issued by a Superior Court judge. Since the ruling, virtually all gang injunction violation cases have been filed in Superior Court as criminal misdemeanor violations. This is the preferred method, compared to civil contempt violations, which have a maximum penalty of five days in custody. A criminal violation allows the prosecutor to seek probation and jail time for repeat offenders, increasing the severity of the violations.

Case Law: People v. Acuna (Cal. App. 1995) April 24, 1995. On April 24, 2005, the court of appeals for the sixth district upheld the issuance of the Sur Trece injunction but struck down every provision in the order that was not already a violation of statutory law (People v. Acuna, 1995). The decision invalidated 15 of the 24 provisions in the preliminary injunction sought by the Santa Clara District Attorney in February 1993. The California Court of Appeal also ruled that the "harassing, intimidating and annoying" language of the injunction was unconstitutionally vague and overly broad and that the prohibition of the gang members congregating in Rocksprings violated their First Amendment right to free association. The San Jose City Council authorized an appeal of that decision to the California Supreme Court, resulting in the opinion reported in People ex rel. Gallo vs. Acuna (1997) 14 Cal. 4th 1090. The appellate court upheld only those provisions that enjoined criminal conduct, as in the case of the Playboy Gangster Crips from 1987 in Los Angeles. The California Court of Appeals found that the injunction against the Varrio Sureno Treces gang was overly broad and did not sufficiently define the prohibited activities or provide definite standard for police enforcement and ascertainment of guilt. The City of San Jose appealed to the state Supreme Court to reinstate two of the fifteen provisions that were struck down, which included the no association clause and the no confronting, intimidating, harassing, and threatening clause. The appeal to the State Supreme Court was filed.

Case Law: People ex rel. Gallo vs. Acuna (1997) 14 Cal. 4th 1090. On January 30, 1997, the constitutionality of gang injunctions as we know them today was established. The California Supreme Court ruled that the City of San Jose may implement a civil gang injunction that restricts non-criminal behavior if committed by alleged gang members in a particular neighborhood. The court overturned the April 1995 appellate court decision in the case. The ACLU and others in opposition to gang injunctions were forced to acknowledge that the decision by the state's highest court would add momentum and increase usage of the increasingly popular technique. The 4–3 ruling, overturning a Court of Appeal decision, upheld a San Jose injunction that barred the gang members from "standing, sitting, walking, driving, gathering or appearing anywhere in public view" with each other in a four-block radius. "Liberty unrestrained is an invitation to anarchy," Justice Janice Rogers Brown wrote for the court. "Freedom and responsibility are joined at the hip." The decision removes a legal cloud over such gang-abatement injunctions, which have been growing in popularity in California as a tool to combat gangs.

The case gave law enforcement the framework for what is needed to seek and obtain gang injunctions. But civil libertarians argue that these injunctions go too far, violating such basic constitutional rights as freedom of speech and freedom of association. Justice Ming W. Chin agreed that courts can prohibit behavior even if it is legal but objected that the injunction. The judge stated, "I do not discount the serious threat to community values that criminal street gangs pose, nevertheless, we cannot turn a blind eye to the necessities of proof. Individuals should not be named as gang members without corroborating evidence that they substantially contributed to the nuisance or intended to do so in the future". The ACLU argued the case before the high court, stating that San Jose's gang injunction was unconstitutionally vague and overly broad and targeted Latino youths without sufficient proof that they had committed any crimes or harassed residents. The ACLU's stance was that because the defendants are suspected gang members, they are stripped of a variety of constitutional freedoms, including the rights to association, assembly, and due process. The ACLU felt the ruling effectively placed law-making power in the hands of judges instead of the legislature, making it unconstitutional. The case submitted contained substantial evidence that the gang was responsible for significant crimes and the named defendants were responsible for some of them. The California Supreme Court held that the gang injunction was neither vague nor overly broad because its terms were reasonably clear in the context of the Varrio Sureno Treces gang. The court also held that the anti-gang injunction did not violate the free association rights of the Varrio Sur Treces members because there is no cognizable First Amendment right to free association implicated by membership in a criminal street gang. Although the Varrio Sur Treces members sought certiorari by the United States Supreme Court, the writ was denied. Thus, in California, anti-gang injunctions have become an established law enforcement tool.

=== Racial profiling ===
According to some critics, the vagueness of gang injunctions and gang identification give way to a system of policing that uses racial profiling to classify and criminalize civilians, even if innocent. Police are accused of using stereotypes that are perpetuated through the media to target potential gang members. Therefore, urban youth of color (often African American or Latino) implicitly become the targets of gang injunctions.

=== Incarceration of youth ===
The functionality of gang injunctions, particularly when coupled with racial profiling, has been said to over-criminalize youth. Youth who have been filed under an injunction or are suspected to be gang members can have their charges intensified from infractions to misdemeanors or misdemeanors to felonies. Mendel claims that juvenile incarceration does not improve public safety but rather harms it: it actually exacerbates criminality and increases recidivism among youth. Supporting Mendel's claims, Kiriakidis further argues that only a small fraction of offenders are given custodial sentences, most of which are too short to actually prevent juveniles from continuing their criminal activities. As a solution, he proposes counseling intervention to reduce recidivism.

There are two main types of prevention programs: primary prevention programs, which target the general youth population and attempt to prevent smoking, drug abuse, and teen pregnancy; and secondary prevention programs, which target youth who are at risk for such outcomes as delinquency or violence. David Old's Nurse Home Visitation Program, for example, significantly decreased child abuse and neglect and arrest rates for both children and mothers. According to Greenwood, programs that underscore family interactions are the most successful, "because they focus on providing skills to the adults who are in the best position to supervise and train the child". Therefore, youth offenders should not be incarcerated but rather be placed in programs in such settings so they will not engage in further criminal activities.

== Alternatives ==
Although gang injunctions sometimes contribute to a short-term decline in reports of gang violence, studies recommend that, if they are used, it should be in conjunction with gang-intervention and gang-rehabilitation programs. Such programs have been shown to reduce gang activity within communities. For example, statistics provided by the LAPD and the NYPD show that gang violence decreased in neighborhoods that implemented gang intervention programs. Further, a study conducted on convicted individuals shows possible benefits of rehabilitation: gang members who received treatment experienced a 20% improvement in recidivism versus those who did not. Gang members who received treatment experienced a 6% difference in recidivism versus those who did not.

Gangs serve as proxies for the after-school programs that the middle class takes for granted. Studies have shown that there is less gang activity in cities where intervention programs are implemented, instead of gang injunctions. Statistics from the LAPD and the NYPD show that there was dramatic decrease in New York City's crime after city council implemented intervention programs. However, in Los Angeles, city council did the opposite and implemented more gang injunctions. In 2005, the NYPD reported only 520 crimes that were gang related, while the LAPD reported 11,402 gang-related crimes. New York City continues to see a decrease as it opens more recreational centers and offers job opportunities for youth.

== Gang injunctions today ==
Since 1999, to prevent rulings against injunctions in the name of constitutionality, city attorneys have carefully worded their filings so that they individually name every gang member, establish a designated area in which the injunction applies, and enumerate the exact activities that gang members are prohibited from doing. These generally include association with one another, wearing certain clothes, making certain hand gestures, acting as lookouts, fighting, drinking, and using drugs. Some prohibited activities are already illegal, but the injunction means that violators can be held in contempt of court, which would demand additional sanctions. Violators who conduct activities that are normally legal are charged with violating a court order, which can carry a six-month jail sentence in California.

== See also ==
- Anti-social behaviour order
- Broken windows theory
- Crime
- Gang intelligence unit
- Gangs in the United States
- List of gangs in the United States
- National Gang Intelligence Center
- Oakland gang injunctions
- Organized Crime
- Racial profiling
- Restorative justice
- Stop and frisk
- War on Gangs
