= Vincenzo Volpe =

Italian painter (1855–1929)

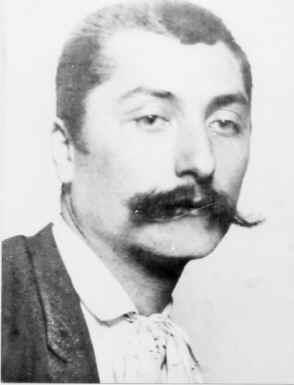
Vincenzo Volpe (date unknown)

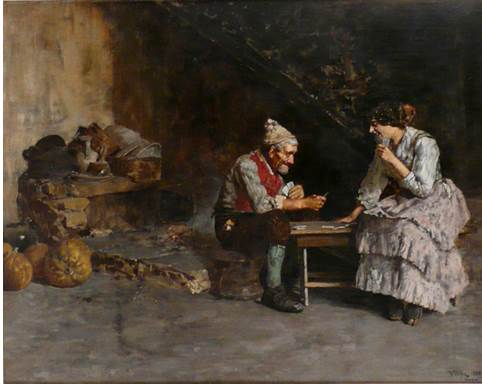
A Couple Playing Cards (1888)

Vincenzo Volpe (December 14, 1855 – February 9, 1929) was an Italian painter. From 1874 to 1890, he painted mostly genre scenes. From 1891 to 1896, he concentrated on religious art, then returned to genre works and portraits.

== Biography ==
He was born in Grottaminarda, Campania, Kingdom of the Two Sicilies. His family moved to Naples when he was eight, and in 1871 he enrolled at the Accademia di Belle Arti there and studied with Domenico Morelli. In 1877 in Naples, he exhibited a painting titled A peaceful interruption; in 1883 in Milan he exhibited Orazione and 'Accordo difficile. He submitted four paintings the same year in Rome, including Canzone allegra, which depicts an old man squatting on a stool, playing guitar and singing to a bed-ridden convalescent girl.

In 1884 in Turin, he exhibited Nello studio; in 1887 in Venice: Una partita d'onore and Lezione di musica. At the 1891 Exposizione Triennale of the Brera Academy, he exhibited Una vecchia canzone. He also did restorative work; notably the frescoes at the Sanctuary of Montevergine near Mercogliano.

In 1900, he was invited to the Royal Palace to do a portrait of King Umberto I. Two years later, he became a Professor at the Accademia and held that position until his death in Naples in 1929. From 1915 to 1925, he served as the Accademia's President. One of his best-known pupils was Giulia Masucci Fava.
