= Rossie =

Rossie may refer to:

== Places ==
- Rossie, Fife, Scotland
- Rossie, Iowa, United States
- Rossie, New York, United States
- Rossie Island, Angus Scotland; see Ferryden
- Rossie Priory, a country house and estate in Perthshire, Scotland

== People ==
- Bob Rosburg (nicknamed "Rossie"; 1926–2009), American golfer and sports color analyst
- Simon Ross (nicknamed "Rossie"), British radio personality
- Rossie D. Alston Jr. (born 1957), United States District Judge

== Other uses ==
- Baron Rossie, a title in the Peerage of the United Kingdom
- Hutchison baronets, of Rossie
- Rossie (1807 ship), American schooner captured by the British in 1813

== See also ==
- Rossi (disambiguation)
