= Rossa (surname) =

Rossa is a surname. Notable people with the surname include:

- Boryana Rossa (b. 1972), Bulgarian artist
- Guido Rossa (1934–1979), Italian worker and syndicalist
- Jeremiah O'Donovan Rossa (1831–1915), Irish-American Fenian leader
- Maria Rita Rossa, Italian politician

== See also ==
- Rossa (disambiguation)
- Rosso (surname)
