= Marco Rossi =

Marco Rossi is the name of:

== Sports ==
- Marco Rossi (decathlete) (born 1963), Italian decathlete
- Marco Rossi (footballer, born 1964), Italian football defender and football coach
- Marco Rossi (footballer, born 1978), Italian football midfielder
- Marco Rossi (footballer, born 1987), Italian football defender
- Marco Rossi (ice hockey) (born 2001), Austrian ice hockey player

== Others ==
- Marco Rossi (Metal Slug), a protagonist of the Metal Slug video game series
- Marco Rossi (3000 Leagues in Search of Mother), the main character in 3000 Leagues in Search of Mother

== See also ==
- Rossi (surname)
