= Alexander Rossi (disambiguation) =

Alexander or Alex Rossi may refer to:

- Alexander Rossi (born 1991), American racing driver
- Alexander Rossi (artist) (1841–1916), British artist
- Alex Rossi (footballer) (born 1968), Brazilian footballer
- Alex Rossi (journalist), British television correspondent
- Alex Rossi (rower) (born 2001), Australian rower

== See also ==
- Alessandra De Rossi (born 1984), Filipino actress sometimes known as Alex De Rossi
