= Maurizio Rossi (disambiguation) =

Maurizio Rossi is a common name in Italy and may refer to:

- Maurizio Rossi (born 1942), Italian lighting designer
- Maurizio Rossi (cyclist) (born 1964), Italian road cyclist
- Maurizio Rossi (footballer, born 1970), Italian football winger

== See also ==
- Maurizio
- Rossi (surname)
