= Rossa =

Rossa may refer to:

== Places ==
- Rossa, Piedmont, a municipality in Italy
- Rossa, Switzerland, a municipality of the Swiss canton of Graubünden
- Rõssa, a village in Orava Parish, Estonia
- Rasos Cemetery (old Rossa in Polish), the oldest cemetery in the city of Vilnius, Lithuania

== People ==
- Rossa (singer) (born 1978), Indonesian singer
- Rossa (surname)
