= Andrea Rossi =

Andrea Rossi may refer to:

- Andrea Rossi (economist), Policy Fellow and Program Director at Harvard University and United Nations Officer
- Andrea Rossi (entrepreneur) (born 1950), Italian businessman and inventor
- Andrea Rossi (footballer) (born 1986), Italian football (soccer) defender
- Andrea Rossi (politician) (born 1976), Italian politician
- Andrea Rossi (sport shooter) (born 1991), Swiss sport shooter

== See also ==
- Andrea de Rossi (born 1972), Italian rugby coach and former rugby union footballer
- Andrea de Rossi (bishop) (1644–1696), Italian Roman Catholic prelate
