= Alexandre Rossi =

- Born: São Paulo, São Paulo, Brazil
- Citizenship: Brazil
- Occupation: Dog trainer
- Years active: 1998–present
- Known for: Dr. Pet
- Website: Official website

Alexandre Pongrácz Rossi is a zootechnician and a Brazilian TV presenter. Alexandre Rossi holds a degree in Zootechnics and a Masters in Psychology from USP. He specialized in Animal Behavior and gained work experience from the University of Queensland, Australia. Today, he is attending veterinary medicine course at FMU.

He began to take an interest in animal behavior at six years old, watching his fish in the aquarium. He taught them to go through rings and to play small bells at the time to eat. The training extended to rabbits, hamsters and pets of his friends.

He is in charge of 'Cão Cidadão' - company specializing in behavioral consultation and training at home, which also offers courses, lectures and workshops.

In addition to several published books, Alexandre Rossi accumulates on his resume works for the cinema, radio and television. He was in charge of Dr. Pet sketch, displayed by Rede Record, and commanded the Program 'Missão Pet', broadcast by the subscription channel National Geographic, and the sketch 'Desafio Pet', in 'Programa Eliana', by SBT. He maintains the program 'Pet na Pan' on Jovem Pan radio, broadcast on Sundays, at 7h00 a.m. and 8h00 a.m. and gives tips on animal behavior in 'É de Casa' program, broadcast by Rede Globo on Saturdays mornings.

Rossi is also known as the father of Estopinha (d. 2023), Barthô and Miah.

== Books ==
Os segredos dos gatos | 2016
Author, in partnership with veterinarian Paula Itikawa. Revised and expanded edition.

Adestramento Inteligente - Como treinar seu cão e resolver problemas de comportamento | 2015
Editora Saraiva
Author. Revised and expanded edition.

Eu cuido com carinho do meu cão | 2011
Editora Caramelo
Author, in partnership with veterinarian Regina Rheingantz Motta.

Eu cuido com carinho do meu gato| 2011
Editora Caramelo
Author, in partnership with veterinarian Regina Rheingantz Motta.

Cão de Família | 2011
Editora Agir
Author, in partnership with veterinarian Alida Gerger.

Adestramento Inteligente: Técnicas de adestramento e soluções de problemas de comportamento | 2009
Editora Saraiva
Author. Revised and expanded edition.

Os segredos dos gatos | 2008
Editora Globo
Author, in partnership with veterinarian Paula Itikawa.

Series Conhecendo seu melhor amigo
Editora Artemeios
Author, in partnership with Mauro Anselmo Alves.

Meu Irmão, o Cão | 2002
Editora Germinal
Author, in partnership with veterinarian Regina Rheingantz Motta.

Adestramento Inteligente com Amor, Humor e Bom Senso | 1999
Editora CMS
Author

== Television ==
É de Casa I Rede Globo

Desafio Pet | Programa Eliana | SBT

Missão Pet | National Geographic

Dr. Pet | 2009
Sketch about animal behavior of the journalistic program 'Domingo Espetacular', broadcast on Sundays by Rede Record.

Participant of the program Mais Você | 2007 a 2008
Variety show, presented by Ana Maria Braga and broadcast from Monday to Friday by Rede Globo.

Participant of the program Pra Valer | 2006
Women's program, presented by Claudete Troiano and broadcast from Monday to Friday by Rede Bandeirantes.

Participant of the program Silvia Poppovic | 2005
Presenter of sketch on animal behavior of the Program Sivia Poppovic, broadcast by TV Cultura.

Participant of the program Late Show | 2002 a 2005
Program about animals presented by Luisa Mell and broadcast on Sundays by Rede TV!.

== Collaborations ==
Newspapers
Folha de S.Paulo, Estado de São Paulo, Gazeta Mercantil, Diário Popular, Correio Brasiliense, Diário do Comércio, Notícias do Japão, O Dia, Diário, Agora SP, among others.

Magazines
Veja, Veja São Paulo, Isto É, Época, Elle, Superinteressante, Claudia, Manchete, Pet Center News, Pulo do Gato, Capricho, among others.

Radio
Band News, Jovem Pan, 89, CBN, Eldorado, among others.

Television
Rede Globo, Rede Record, Rede Bandeirantes, TV Cultura, Rede Gospel, Canal Rural, among others.
