= Pietro Russo =

Sicilian mapmaker (fl. 1508)

Pietro Russo (fl. 1508) was a Sicilian mapmaker.

He was probably born in Messina although it has also been speculated that he was of Mallorcan or Valencian origin.

He made portolan charts, three or perhaps four of which are still extant. One of them, signed by Pietru Russu in Messina on 1 October 1508, is kept at the Maritime Museum of Barcelona.

He was probably the father of Jacopo Russo, another Sicilian mapmaker.

== Bibliography ==
- Corradino Astengo, "The Renaissance Chart Tradition in the Mediterranean", in The History of Cartography, Volume Three (Part 1): Cartography in the European Renaissance, Edited by David Woodward, Chicago, University of Chicago Press, 2007, pp. 174–262.
- Roberto Almagià, "I lavori cartografici di Pietro e Jacopo Russo", in Academia Nazionale dei Lincei. Rendiconti della classe di Scienze morali, storiche e filologiche, serie VIII, vol. XII, fasc. 7-10, Luglio-Ottobre 1957, p. 301-320.
