= Luigi Fontana Russo =

Luigi Fontana Russo (Trapani, 15 January 1868 - Trapani, 1953) was an Italian economist and lecturer.

== Career ==
From 1907, he taught trade policy and customs law at the University of Rome. It was part of the School Luzzattiana. From 1913 to 1919 he was Rector of the Royal Institute of Business Studies and Administrative Sapienza University of Rome. From 1928 he taught economic policy. He continued teaching until 1938. He was also President of the Bank of Italy. He organized the Federation of Italian owners.
