= Daniel Rossi =

Daniel Rossi may refer to:

- Daniel Rossi (bishop) (died 1538), Italian Roman Catholic bishop
- Daniel Rossi (fencer) (1920–1992), Uruguayan Olympic fencer
- Daniel Rossi (footballer) (born 1981), Brazilian footballer
- Dan Rossi, American hot dog vendor
