= Pietro Rossi =

Pietro Rossi or Pietro de' Rossi may refer to:

== People ==
- Pietro de' Rossi (1303–1337) (1303–1337), Italian condottiero and lord of Parma, brother of Rolando de' Rossi
- Pietro Rossi (1403–1459), Italian philosopher from Siena
- Pietro Rossi (scientist) (1738–1804), Italian scientist and entomologist
- Pietro Rossi (sculptor) (fl. 1856–1882), Italian sculptor
- Pietro Rossi (chess) (1924–2020), Italian chess endgame composer
- Pietro Rossi (born 1930), Italian philosopher
- Pietro Maria Rossi may refer to:
  - Pier Maria I de' Rossi (1374–1438), Italian nobleman
  - Pier Maria II de' Rossi (1413–1482), Italian condottiero
  - Pier Maria III de' Rossi (1504–1547), Italian general
  - Pier Maria IV de' Rossi (1620–1653), Italian condottiero

== Other ==
- Pietro Rossi (Hayez), painting by Francesco Hayez depicting Pietro de' Rossi
- Pietro Rossi (fictional character), actor and lover of Lucrezia Borgia in the video game Assassin's Creed: Brotherhood
