= Ernesto Rossi =

Ernesto Rossi may refer to:

- Ernesto Rossi (actor) (1827–1896), Italian actor
- Ernesto Rossi (gangster) (1903–1931), Italian-American gangster
- Ernesto Rossi (politician) (1897–1967), Italian politician and anti-fascist activist
