= Carlo Rossi =

Carlo Rossi may refer to:

- Carlo Rossi (architect) (1775–1849), Italian/Russian architect
- Carlo Rossi (general) (1880–1967), Italian general
- Carlo Rossi (lyricist) (1920–1989), Italian lyricist and record producer
- Carlo Rossi (politician) (1925–1998), Canadian politician
- Carlo Rossi (racing driver) (born 1955), former Italian race car driver
- Carlo Alberto Rossi (1921–2010), Italian composer and music producer
- Carlo Ubaldo Rossi (1958–2015), Italian composer and music producer
- Carlo Rossi (wine)
