= Alex Rossi (journalist) =

Alex Rossi is the National Correspondent of Sky News, the 24-hour television news service operated by Sky Television, part of British Sky Broadcasting. Born about 1972-73, he is from Salisbury, Wiltshire and is based in Delhi in India, reporting on news stories across the Southern Asia region, including Pakistan and Afghanistan.

He was formerly Sky News Europe Correspondent, based in Brussels and Russia Correspondent, based in Moscow, before becoming Asia Correspondent in 2011. He has since become the National correspondent, "focusing on the changing face of Britain."

== Education ==
Rossi was educated at Bishop Wordsworth's School, a Voluntary Aided Church of England day grammar school for boys in the cathedral city of Salisbury in Wiltshire in South West England, followed by the University of Central England (in 2005 renamed UCE Birmingham and in 2007, Birmingham City University), in the city of Birmingham, in the Midlands area of Central England, where he studied Broadcast Journalism.

== Life and career ==
After university, Rossi joined BBC Local Radio in 1997. He worked for BBC Radio York before joining Tyne Tees Television as a reporter, based in Middlesbrough. After a couple of years, he moved to Meridian Television as a sub-editor in Southampton and then as a reporter based in the Thames Valley.

As Sky News' Europe Correspondent, based in Brussels, Rossi covered a broad range of stories on the European financial crisis, from political summits to economic protests. Among those he reported on were the Amanda Knox trial in 2009 and the death of German goalkeeper Robert Enke. As Russia Correspondent, based in Moscow, he reported on the G8 Summit from St Petersburg, the verdicts in the Beslan trial and was on the front line during the conflict between Russia and Georgia. He uncovered a number of exclusive stories on the poisoning murder of Russian businessman Alexander Litvinenko in London, and was the first Western journalist to interview Andrei Lugovoy after he was named as a suspect in the murder.

Rossi was one of the first correspondents to reach the Iranian city of Bam after it was destroyed by an earthquake in 2003. He has also reported from the Asian tsunami, from New Orleans in the aftermath of Hurricane Katrina and has covered the conflicts in Afghanistan and Lebanon, the civil war and overthrow of Muammar Gaddafi in Libya, and the Arab Spring across North Africa and the Middle East.

Rossi became Sky News' Asia Correspondent in 2011, based in Delhi, India. He has broken a number of stories as Asia Correspondent, among them the abuse of India’s food aid programme and the effect of India’s rapid economic growth on rural life.

Rossi was travelling through Brussels Airport when the 2016 Brussels bombings took place. Together with a cameraman, he provided live footage of the scene within the airport from moments after the bombing.

Later, since February 24th's, 2022 Russian invasion of Ukraine, he reported news regarding the military and political situation from the frontlines and the rear guard; Bakhmut, Kharkiv, Kyiv, and others are locations he has visited in order to provide live and pre-recorded reports of the war.

== Family ==
Rossi is married and has two children. He successfully completed an Ironman in Nice, France, in 2010.
