= Alessandro Rossi =

Alessandro Rossi may refer to:

- Alessandro Rossi (bishop of Parma) (1555–1615), Italian Roman Catholic bishop
- Alessandro Rossi (bishop of Ariano) (1589–1656), Italian Roman Catholic bishop
- Alessandro Rossi (textile industrialist) (1819–1898), Italian industrialist of Schio, Veneto
- Alessandro Rossi (actor) (born 1955), Italian actor and voice actor
- Alessandro Rossi (Captain Regent) (born 1967), Captain Regent-elect of San Marino, and former Captain Regent (2007)
- Alessandro Rossi (footballer) (born 1997), Italian footballer
