= Rosso (disambiguation) =

Rosso is a city of south-western Mauritania, located in the department of the same name.

Rosso, Italian for red, may also refer to:

- Rosso (band), a Japanese musical group
- Rosso Kumamoto, a Japanese football club
- Rosso Corporation, a Japanese model car manufacturer
- Rosso (bus company), a bus operator in north-west England
- Rosso (restaurant), a Finnish restaurant chain serving Italian cuisine

== People with the name ==
- Rosso (surname), a surname (including a list of people with the name)
- Rosso Fiorentino (c. 1495–1540), Italian painter
