= Francois Russo =

Fashion designer (born 1966)

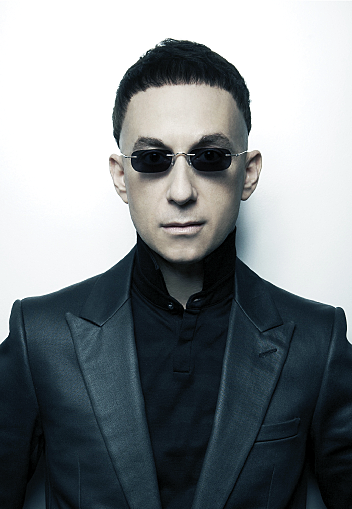
- Born: 1966 (age 59–60)
- Education: Ecole des Hautes Etudes Commerciales
- Occupation: Designer
- Known for: Founder of Maison Takuya

Francois Russo (born 1966) is the creative director and founder of Maison Takuya, a company which he founded in 2008 and which designs luxury leather goods. He is the co-founder of contemporary art Gallery Russo|Yubero located in Switzerland and Thailand He was raised in Paris and currently (in 2013) lives in Bangkok and Chiang Mai, Thailand.

== Education and career ==
Francois Russo graduated from Ecole des Hautes Etudes Commerciales (HEC Paris) in 1989 and began his career at Cartier, where he helped establish Cartier's Institut Supérieur de Marketing du Luxe (ISML). Russo then moved to the marketing division of L'Oréal, and then to The French Mint where he was appointed International Director in 1991. In 1995, he joined Havas Advertising. In 2001, he founded an image agency where he engaged in art direction, professional photography and interior design.

In 1999, he became an advisor to the Swiss private bank Lombard Odier & Cie.

In 2003, Russo joined French designer Andrée Putman as co-chairman of her agency. Their first project together was the design of the first store for the perfume brand Guerlain (LVMH Group) on the Champs-Elysées in Paris. Other design projects included hotels (The Putman in Hong Kong, Spa of Hotel Bayerischer Hof in Munich), boutiques and corners (Helena Rubinstein worldwide and Anne Fontaine in Tokyo, Paris and New York), private residences, company headquarters (Novartis in Basel), furnishing (Cappellini, Poltrona Frau, Pleyel, Reflex, Emeco), one-off items and collections (Christofle, Mont-Blanc, Chivas, Louis Vuitton) and design consulting (Novartis Campus Basel, Chanel).

In 2005 Russo was engaged as a design consultant for Chanel. In 2007, he designed the commemorative Jacques Helleu Chair for the leading Italian furniture maker, Poltrona Frau.

As of 2017, Russo continues to head the luxury leather goods company Maison Takuya after granting control of the brand to luxury retailer Club 21.

== Awards ==
Russo was awarded an honorary degree in 1999 by the Institut Supérieur du Marketing de Luxe.

== Publications ==
- Stratégies de luxe (HEC Publishing).
- Andrée Putman (Pyramid Publishing), co-authored with former French Ministry of Culture Jack Lang.
- Foreword of Andrée Putman by Stéphane Gerschel (Assouline Publishing).

== Sources ==
- "Strength of Character". The Architects Newspaper. 5 July 2008.
- "Back To Basic". Los Angeles Times. 24 April 2008.
- "CARRY IT OFF". Jakarta Globe, 1 April 2013.
- "Francois Russo: International Man of Luxury". Chiang Mai Citylife, 31 December 2014.
- "Francois Russo Biography". Poltrona Frau, 5 September 2018.
- "HAND STITCHING AND HEALTHY GRAINS AT MAISON TAKUYA". OBJEKT INTERNATIONAL, 5 September 2018.
- "Francois Russo". OBJEKT INTERNATIONAL, 16 October 2014.
- "หรู เรียบ..เมด อิน ไทยแลนด์". Pye. 24 July 2013.
- "แรงบันดาลใจที่เชียงใหม่ของ Francois Russo". VOLUME Blog. 24 May 2013.
- "Francois Russo แห่ง Maison Takuya “ไม่แอร์เมส… ก็ต้องแบรนด์นี้แหละ!”". PRAEW. 16 June 2016.
