= Barbara Parker (California politician) =

American lawyer and politician

Barbara J. Parker
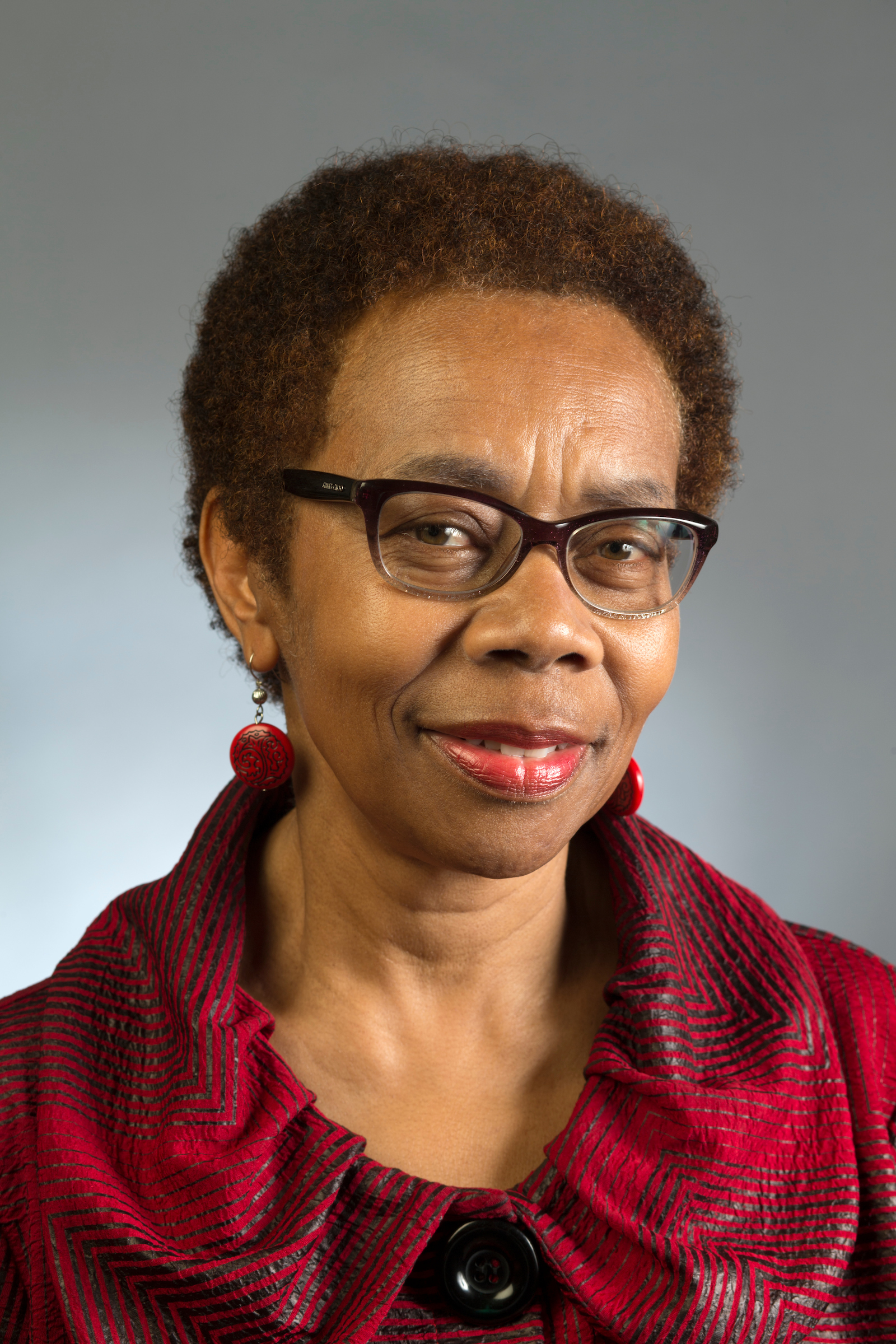

City Attorney, Oakland, California
- In office July 19, 2011 – January 6, 2025
- Preceded by: John A. Russo
- Succeeded by: Ryan Richardson

Personal details
- Born: Seattle, Washington
- Party: Democratic Party
- Education: University of Washington; Harvard Law School
- Website: www.cityattorneyparker.com

Barbara Parker was the city attorney of Oakland, California, from 2011 to 2025. Born in Seattle, Parker was one of the first African American women to graduate Harvard Law School. After 20 years working as an attorney in the Oakland City Attorney's Office, Parker was appointed city attorney to fill the vacancy left by John Russo. Parker won three elections in 2012, 2016 and 2020 to keep the seat. She is the first African American woman elected to citywide office in Oakland. While in office, Parker led the office in lawsuits concerning cannabis regulation, the finance industry, climate change and the environment, and human trafficking.

== Early life and career ==
Parker is a native of Seattle. Parker's mother was a sharecropper and her father was a farmer in Arkansas. Parker's parents moved to Seattle for economic opportunity. Parker recalls facing racial discrimination in her childhood, and she was encouraged by her parents to improve the conditions of Black people.

Parker earned an undergraduate degree in economics from the University of Washington. She and her siblings are the first generation in her family's history to go to college.

Parker was one of the very few African American women at Harvard Law School when she graduated in 1975.

== Political career ==
Parker worked briefly as a corporate attorney and then as a federal prosecutor in the United States District Court for the Northern District of California from 1978 to 1983. She began working for the Oakland City Attorney's office in 1991. According to the city attorney's office, Parker became Chief Assistant City Attorney in 2000, second in command to City Attorney John Russo. In 2005, Parker was appointed to the Judicial Council of California.

When Russo resigned to become city manager of neighboring Alameda, California in 2011, he appointed Parker as acting city attorney. The Oakland City Council appointed Parker as city attorney on July 19, 2011, filling the vacancy until the end of the term in 2013.

=== Elections ===
In November 2012, Parker was elected to become the second elected Oakland City Attorney, defeating Councilmember Jane Brunner by 68 to 31 percent. Parker is the first African American woman elected to citywide office in Oakland.

In November 2016, Parker ran unopposed for re-election.

In November 2020, Parker ran against Elias Ferran and was elected to a third 4-year term with 80.4% of the vote.

Parker chose not to run for re-election in 2024. She was succeeded by Ryan Richardson.

=== Cases ===
Major cases include a lawsuit against the federal government to uphold Oakland's right to regulate and license medical cannabis dispensaries, and an antitrust action against big banks that has recovered more than $1 million from financial institutions including Wachovia and JPMorgan.

As city attorney, Parker sued numerous hotels and motels for allowing and profiting from prostitution/human trafficking. In 2012, Parker's office forced the closure of two hotels for a year. In 2015, Parker filed suit against a hotel near Mills College known for crimes including drug trafficking, robbery, and rape. Some hotels shut down; others settled and agreed to improve conditions.

In 2013, Parker won a record $15 million judgment against an immigration consulting business that preyed on and defrauded immigrant families seeking legal residency in the U.S.

In September 2017, Parker and San Francisco City Attorney Dennis Herrera filed lawsuits against the top five largest investor-owned oil and gas companies. The lawsuits ask the courts to hold these companies responsible for the costs of sea walls and other infrastructure necessary to protect Oakland and San Francisco from ongoing and future consequences of climate change and sea level rise caused by the companies' production of massive amounts of fossil fuels. The oil companies tried to keep these lawsuits in federal court, where they would be more likely to be dismissed. But in 2022, a federal judge rejected this bid, allowing Oakland and San Francisco to continue prosecution of their climate justice and public nuisance lawsuits in California courts.

==== Monsanto ====
In 2015, Parker sued the giant chemical company Monsanto to hold it accountable for "vast contamination" of Oakland's storm water system and the San Francisco Bay. Parker's office also filed a federal lawsuit against Wells Fargo to recover damages caused by predatory and discriminatory mortgage lending practices by the bank against African American and Latino borrowers.

In 2020, Oakland joined a nationwide class action suit lawsuit against Monsanto and pharmaceutical giant Bayer, which acquired Monsanto in 2016. In 2022, Oakland received an estimated $7.5 million as part of a $527.5 million settlement, to monitor or clean up PCB contamination of public water sources.

=== Legislation ===
In 2012, Parker co-sponsored legislation with Councilmember Nancy Nadel to increase penalties for unsanctioned graffiti and property owners who do not clean up graffiti. The legislation passed.

Parker proposed a law with Councilmember Lynette Gibson McElhaney to increase penalties for illegal dumping.

Parker co-authored a comprehensive ethics reform act adopted by the city council in 2015, and her office has required landlords in Oakland to fix substandard living conditions.

Parker co-sponsored a gun safety ordinance to reduce theft of firearms from vehicles. The law makes it a crime to leave firearms, magazines or ammunition unsecured in unattended vehicles on city streets and in other public places.

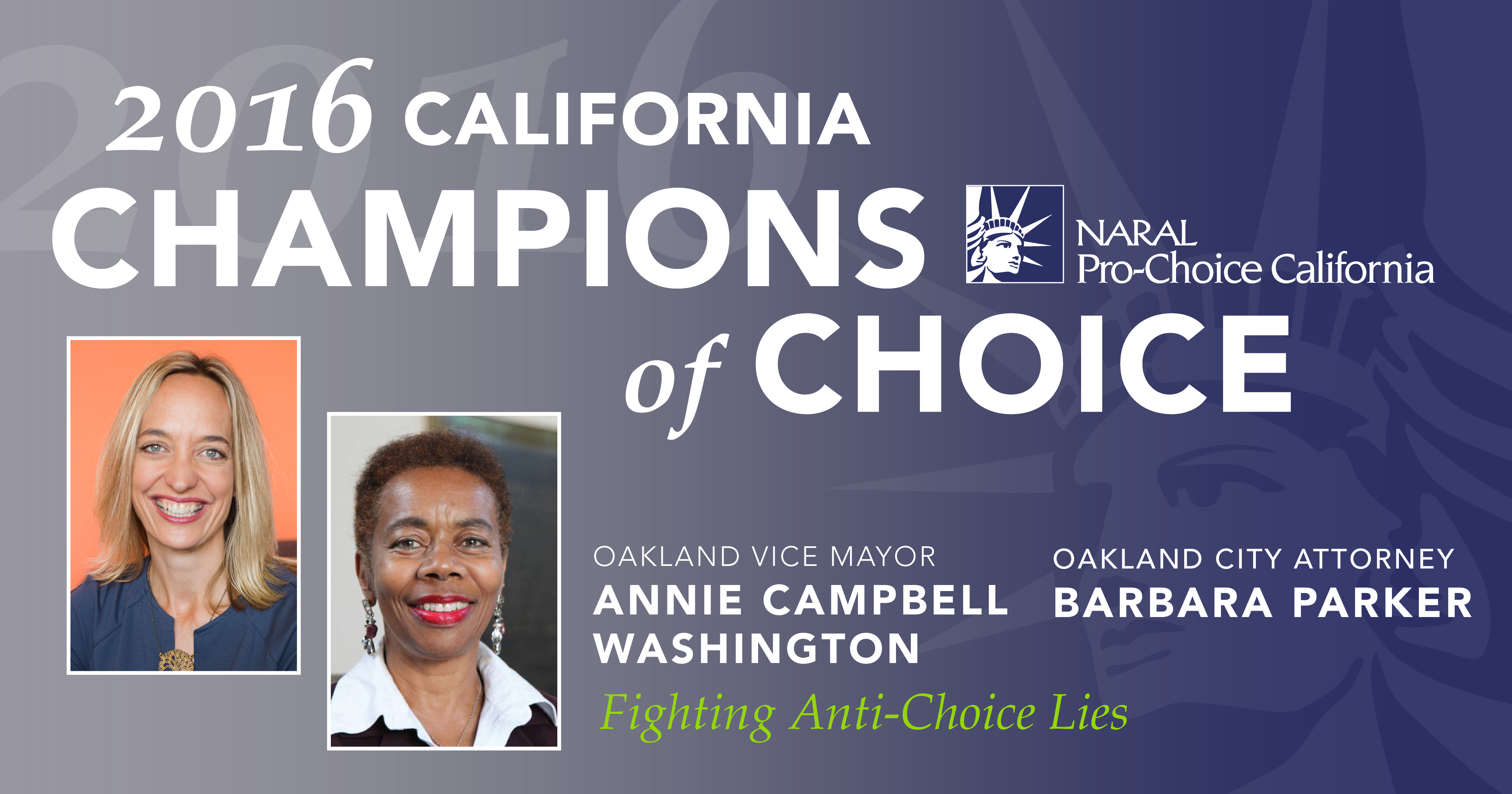
In December 2016, Parker was named a "2016 Champion of Choice" for her work on an Oakland ordinance that prevents anti-abortion organizations from representing themselves as medical professionals or health care counselors.

Parker was named a "2016 California Champion of Choice" by NARAL Pro-Choice California for her work on the ordinance.

=== Campaigns ===
Parker's office spearheaded a campaign to crack down on illegal dumping in Oakland using videos and other evidence submitted by the public.

== Awards ==
In 2013, Parker received the "Distinguished Public Service Award" from the International Municipal Lawyers Association.

The State Bar of California named Parker Public Lawyer of the Year in 2015.

In January 2018, the Alameda County Bar Association recognized Parker's Office with the Distinguished Service Award (Law Firm of the Year).

== Personal life ==
As of 2020, Parker lives in the Haddon Hill neighborhood east of Lake Merritt. She has one daughter she raised as a single mother.
