= Russo Law Firm =

American consumer and class action law firm

- Headquarters: Boca Raton, Florida, United States
- No. of attorneys: 4 (2024)
- Major practice areas: Personal injury, class action and consumer litigation, mass torts
- Key people: Anthony J. Russo Jr (founding partner)
- Website: therussofirm.com

The Russo Law Firm is an American consumer and class action law firm based in Boca Raton, Florida with offices nationwide. It has played a role in consumer class action lawsuits challenging alleged deceptive advertising and marketing practices by major food and other consumer brands. The firm's founding partner is Anthony J. Russo.

== Practice ==
As of 2024 the firm employed four full-time lawyers and took on more than 500 matters annually. Russo has said that as much as 85 per cent of the practice consists of routine personal injury work arising from road collisions and slip-and-fall incidents, with the balance made up of class actions, mass torts and individual consumer claims. The firm does not advertise on billboards or television, and instead draws work from its website, former clients, press coverage and referrals from other lawyers; the lead claimant in its litigation against Hershey had previously been a client of the firm in a road accident matter. Russo took his Juris Doctor degree at Nova Southeastern University law school in Davie and had practised in south-east Florida for 29 years by 2024, the year in which the firm moved to new premises in Boca Raton, a relocation he attributed to growth.

The firm's class action work began in January 2021 with a claim against Amazon over the suspension of expedited delivery for Prime subscribers during the early stage of the COVID-19 pandemic, which the firm framed as a breach of contract. The claim was dismissed, with the judge reasoning that in an unprecedented public health emergency, the failure to reprioritise deliveries might have been the only objectionable conduct. Through that case, Russo met the New York lawyer James C. Kelly, who became his partner in the firm's class action practice.

== Class action lawsuits ==
Since the early 2020s, the Russo Law Firm has filed a series of proposed class action lawsuits targeting restaurant chains and packaged food manufacturers over alleged discrepancies between advertising images and the products sold to consumers. According to a CNN article in 2023, two lawyers at the firm – James Kelly and Anthony Russo – were "leading the charge" against fast food companies for misrepresenting food in their marketing.

In 2022, Russo filed a major class action against Burger King alleging that the fast food company's advertising falsely advertised that its Whoppers were larger than they were. In response, Burger King unsuccessfully sought to sanction the plaintiffs' lawyers. In November 2025, Judge Roy Altman refused to certify a nationwide class, holding that the state consumer protection statutes relied on differed considerably and that individual questions would predominate, since the claimants had bought burgers of widely varying shape and size. He added that prices had fluctuated since the start of the proposed class period on 1 April 2018, so that each member would have to establish when and where a purchase was made and what was paid for it. The decision substantially reduced the damages at stake. Burger King said it was content with the outcome and repeated its position that the allegations were untrue. The following month the judge recorded on the docket that he was minded to dismiss the remaining state-law claims and close the case, and directed the claimants to set out how they intended to proceed.

The same year, the firm represented a client suing Wendy's and McDonald's for overstating the amount of beef in burgers. The lawsuit was listed as one of the "greatest class action hits" by the Wall Street Journal in an editorial decrying class action abuse. The action was dismissed at the end of September 2023 by Judge Hector Gonzalez in Brooklyn, who noted that the website images under challenge set out the weight of meat and the calorie content of each item, and held that the claimant, Justin Chimienti, had not shown that a reasonable customer would be misled. The judge treated the advertising as puffery, comparable to the use of models to present a product attractively.

Other fast food companies targeted by the firm have included Taco Bell and Arby's. The claim against Taco Bell was filed in the Eastern District of New York at the end of July 2023 by Frank Siragusa, who alleged that a Mexican Pizza bought for $5.49 held roughly half the beef and bean filling he had been led to expect, and that the Crunchwrap Supreme, Grande Crunchwrap and meat-free versions of both items were similarly overstated by at least a factor of two. The complaint paired advertising images with customer photos and drew on press coverage and online reviews. Besides compensation of more than $5 million, it asked the court to require the chain either to correct the advertising or to withdraw the items from sale. The case was voluntarily dismissed in November 2023; Florida Trend observed that such a dismissal often indicates a settlement, and Russo declined to comment on it.

By April 2024, the firm was acting against Hershey over packaging for seasonal Reese's products, which depicted carved designs that the sweets themselves did not carry. The named claimant was Cynthia Kelly. In September 2026, Judge Melissa Damian dismissed a proposed class action over the same Halloween-themed products brought by two Florida consumers, Nathan Vidal and Eduardo Granados, holding that they lacked standing because their injury amounted to no more than subjective disappointment and they had not alleged that what they bought was defective or worthless. The judge also rejected their contention that they had paid up to 25 per cent too much, noting that the comparison prices came from retailers other than the one where they made the purchases. Hershey had argued that the packaging presented the carved faces as a decorating suggestion that no reasonable consumer would read as a guarantee. Damian had dismissed an earlier version of the complaint in September 2025, and Kelly, acting for the claimants, said they would appeal.

== Mass torts ==
Russo's first mass tort work came in the 1990s and concerned Fen-Phen, the weight-loss drug combination later linked to heart damage. He has described the firm he was then with hiring a hotel ballroom and bringing in medical staff and electrocardiograph equipment to screen several hundred potential claimants, and has contrasted that approach with the marketing companies many firms now pay to generate leads; most of his mass tort instructions come instead from other lawyers and from the firm's website.

He left the field after the Fen-Phen litigation and returned to it some years later, subsequently signing clients in proceedings over 3M military earplugs, Monsanto's Roundup, water contamination at Camp Lejeune, firefighting foam containing PFAS, the Essure contraceptive device and claims alleging a link between Tylenol and autism. He attended the hearing in New York in December 2023 at which the judge overseeing the Tylenol litigation ruled the claimants' expert evidence inadmissible, effectively ending those claims, and has said he expects the next waves of mass tort work to concern Ozempic and Suboxone.
