= Anthony Russo =

Anthony Russo or Tony Russo may refer to:

- Anthony Russo (American football) (born 1997), American football quarterback
- Anthony Russo (director) (born 1970), film and television director-producer
- Anthony Russo (mayor) (born 1947), mayor of Hoboken, New Jersey
- Anthony Russo (mobster) (1916–1979), Genovese crime family figure
- Anthony Russo (Ohio politician) (1920–1985), member of the Ohio House of Representatives
- Anthony E. Russo (born 1926), member of the New Jersey State Senate
- Tony Russo (whistleblower) (1936–2008), involved in the Pentagon Papers leak
- Tony Russel (born Antonio Pietro Russo, and sometimes credited as Tony Russo or Tony Russell; 1925–2017), American actor

== See also ==
- Ettore Zappi (1904–1986), aka Tony Russo, Gambino crime family figure and nephew of mobster Andrew Russo
