= John A. Russo (politician) =

American lawyer

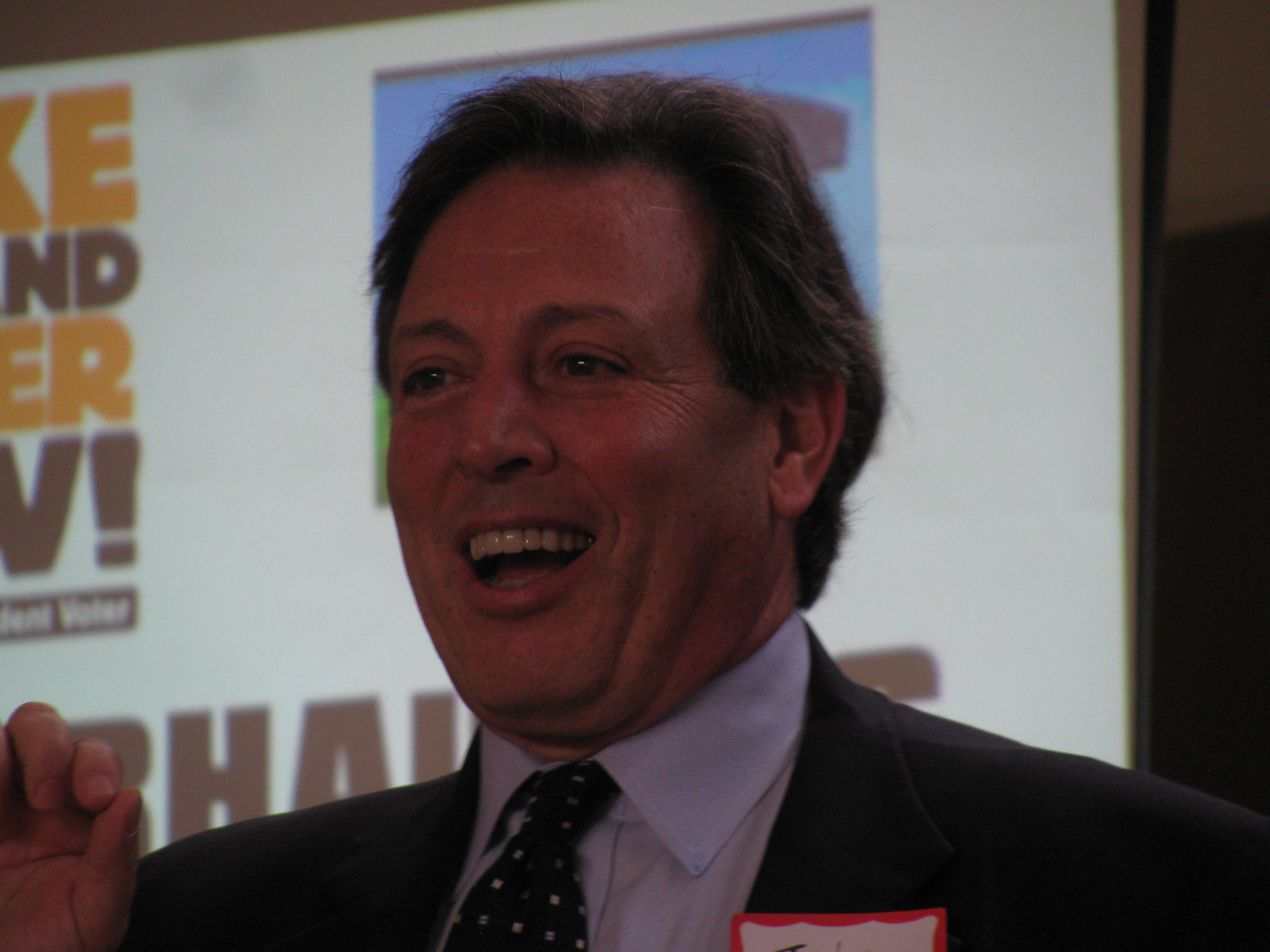
- portrait of John A. Russo

City manager, Irvine, California
- In office July 2018 – May 2020

City manager, Riverside, California
- In office May 4, 2015 – April 17, 2018

City manager, Alameda, California
- In office June 13, 2011 – February 23, 2015

City attorney, Oakland, California
- In office September 2000 – June 10, 2011
- Succeeded by: Barbara Parker

Member Oakland City Council
- In office 1995–2000

Personal details
- Born: Brooklyn, New York
- Education: Yale University; New York University School of Law (JD)

John A. Russo (born February 6, 1959) is a former American politician, city attorney, and city manager with municipal management experience in four cities in the state of California.

Russo was a member of the Oakland City Council from 1994 to 2000, where he served as finance committee chair and became a leading advocate for fiscal accountability and government reform. In September 2000, he became the first elected city attorney of Oakland, California after a little-debated aspect of Jerry Brown's strong-mayor initiative, Measure X, changed the city attorney post from an appointed to an elected one.

Russo served as the president of the League of California Cities from 2002 to 2003, serving a total of nine years on the board.

In 2007, during his second term as city attorney, Russo ran unsuccessfully for the California Assembly 16th District seat in 2006. In June 2008, Russo was re-elected to a third term as city attorney, running unopposed.

In 2011 Russo was named the city manager for neighboring Alameda, California.

In 2015, Russo was named the city manager of Riverside, California. He served in that position for nearly three years, establishing practices of reform and accountability and increasing projects in arts and culture, including initiating the deal to bring the Cheech Marin Center for Art, Culture, and Industry to Riverside. According to the Press Enterprise, "Russo, who has served as City Manager since 2015, has been behind initiatives like the Sunshine Ordinance to improve transparency in city government, a more robust budget process and a rotating system of audits of all city departments."

In 2018, the Irvine City Council voted unanimously to name Russo as the city manager for Irvine, California. In 2019, Russo was included on the Orange County Register list of 100 Top Influencers. Russo resigned in 2020 to devote more time to family.

== Background ==
John Russo was born and raised in the Italian immigrant Carroll Gardens section of Brooklyn, New York. His father, a construction worker and union vice president, and his mother, a dressmaker, moved to the United States from London in 1958 five months before he was born. Russo attended Xaverian High School in Bay Ridge, Brooklyn, NY. He graduated with honors in economics and political science from Yale University and earned his J.D. degree from New York University School of Law.

After a two-year stint as a Legal Aid attorney in St. Louis, Missouri, Russo moved to Oakland in 1987. He served as president of Friends of Oakland Parks and Recreation, treasurer of the East Bay League of Conservation Voters, and pro bono attorney to several neighborhood associations and non-profits.

In June 1994, John was elected to the Oakland City Council, where he became the council's leading advocate for fiscal accountability and government reform. In his six years on the council, John implemented community policing, developed the first balanced budget in a generation, and working closely with the League of Woman Voters, authored Oakland's open government law called the "sunshine" ordinance.

In 2002, John served as president of the League of California Cities spearheading initiatives to protect local tax revenues from state fiscal mismanagement and amend California's Constitution to ensure public access to government records and decision-making. His ability to work 'across the aisle' earned him a seat on the Board of the National League of Cities, an organization which represents more than 18,000 towns and cities, in December 2003.

== Neighborhood Law Corps ==
In 2001, Russo founded the Neighborhood Law Corps, an organization to help address chronic urban problems. Law Corps attorneys, generally new law school graduates, focus on quality-of-life issues and tackle cases involving drug dealing and building-code violations. The Law Corps also led Oakland's crackdown on liquor stores considered a blight on the community because they were providing a haven for drug dealing and other nuisances. In 2006, the National League of Cities named Oakland as one of nine winners of its 2006 award for municipal excellence, and one of three Gold award winners honoring the work of the Neighborhood Law Corps.

== Open Government Program ==
As city attorney, Russo created the Open Government Program. The program ensured that citizens of Oakland have full access to information about their city and that the business of city government would be conducted in the light of day. Three pieces of legislation were cited to support the intent of the Open Government Program: The Ralph M. Brown Act (California Law, Government Code, Sections 54950 – 54962): The California Public Records Act (California Law, Government Code, Sections 6250 – 6277); the Oakland Sunshine Ordinance (Title 2, Chapter 2.20).

== Riders' settlement ==
In 2003, Russo's office negotiated the largest legal settlement in Oakland municipal history. Plaintiffs who claimed they were victimized by a group of rogue cops known as "the Riders" shared $10.5 million in damages. The settlement brought major changes to police department operations and dealings with the public. The case riveted the city as it was the largest case of police misconduct in Oakland in decades. Despite the settlement's hefty price tag, Russo said the cases could have cost the city tens of millions of dollars more had they gone to trial, pointing out that the victims had spent more than 25 years, combined, imprisoned on false charges. By comparison, Los Angeles spent $40 million to settle litigation stemming from the Rampart corruption scandal.

The payout went to 119 plaintiffs who filed federal civil rights lawsuits claiming four police officers kidnapped, beat and planted drugs on them during the summer of 2000. The plaintiffs alleged that the Oakland Police Department either encouraged or turned a blind eye to the abuse. U.S. District Court Judge Thelton Henderson approved the settlement in the civil cases after 18 months of negotiations.

We did not bury our heads in the sand. We acknowledged freely our faults, and we've worked arm in arm toward fixing the problem rather than hiding from or denying the problem," said City Attorney John Russo. "A lot of the plaintiffs are people who have bad histories with the law," Russo said. But "there are some people who did not have trouble with the law who got caught up in this kind of overzealous behavior. And even people who are career criminals are entitled to their constitutional rights."

In addition, he said, the settlement prevented the U.S. Justice Department from imposing changes on the police department through consent decree, as it has done in other cities facing police misconduct scandals such as Los Angeles. Russo said the changes will make it easier for police brass to identify problem officers and deal with them.

At the high point of their careers, the so-called "Riders" were considered the best and the brightest, veterans whom rookie police officers tried to emulate. Their specialty: bringing in reputed drug dealers in record numbers from the crime-plagued streets of West Oakland.

The alleged abuses came to light after a rookie officer, just 10 days on the job and fresh out of the police academy, resigned and reported his former co-workers' activities to the police department's internal affairs division.

== Anti-bias policy ==
In 2002, two city of Oakland employees had posted fliers in the workplace advertising the "Good News Employee Association", a group created to promote "natural family, marriage, and family values." The flier also said, "We believe the natural family is defined as a man and a woman, their children by birth or adoption, or the surviving remnant thereof."

The fliers were posted in response to a celebratory message sent from openly gay former City Council member Danny Wan to city staff on National Coming Out Day in 2002.

One flier was posted just outside the cubicle of a lesbian colleague. When she complained about the homophobic fliers, the city attorney's office conducted an investigation and concluded "the fliers were causing a workplace disruption and were in violation of the city's anti-discrimination policy," according to Angela Padilla, one of the lawyers representing the city in the initial court case.

The plaintiffs stated in their deposition that gay and lesbian employees were like "weeds" in the workplace, and that their intention was "to keep [the workplace] from spoiling, to keep it from rotting, to keep it from deteriorating."

The plaintiffs were invited to post different fliers without discriminatory language, but instead they elected to sue the city over violation of their free speech rights. The case went to court, and the bulk of the case was dismissed in March 2004, while the free speech issues were dismissed in July 2005.

According to 9th Circuit Court Judge Richard Clifton, the flier presented homosexuality as something that hurt the "integrity" of the workplace, violating the city of Oakland's policy of non-discrimination based on sexual orientation in the workplace. The plaintiffs then appealed to the Supreme Court, but the court declined to hear the appeal.

The case received national attention when Washington Post columnist George Will denounced the city of Oakland for infringing on the plaintiffs' free speech rights.

In his response to Will, printed in the San Francisco Chronicle, Russo reminded readers that the plaintiffs were deliberately attempting to exclude their LGBT co-workers. Russo pointed out that rather than being only a liberal issue, it was a conservative judge, a Bush appointee, who said, "It's hard to avoid the inference, 'We lack ethics, we lack integrity because these people are here.'"

== Seat belt sting ==
In 2007, Russo was caught in a law enforcement campaign to catch seat belt scofflaws. Russo was ticketed and the incident ended up in the local media.

In a San Francisco Chronicle interview, Russo acknowledged that he wasn't wearing his seat belt when he was pulled over by officers at about 5:30 p.m. on Piedmont Avenue in Oakland. He said he had been distracted as he left the popular Fentons Creamery with his twin 8-year-old sons in the back seat of his 2004 Honda Civic hybrid.

In response to the ticket, a tongue-in-cheek Public Service Announcement was produced with Russo, his twin sons, and a friend, to contribute to the national law enforcement PR campaign, "Click it or Ticket" which included a video posted to YouTube and an ad that appeared among other locations, the Oakland BART station.

== Awards ==
In 2006, the National League of Cities named Oakland as one of nine winners of its 2006 Award for Municipal Excellence, and one of three Gold award winners honoring the work of the Neighborhood Law Corps. In 2005 the program won the Grand Prize, Helen Putnam Award for Excellence from the National League of Cities.

In August 2005, John Russo was voted a Northern California Super Lawyer by his peers and the independent research of the Law & Politics Magazine.

In 2004, the League of California Cities gave John Russo the Champion of Local Democracy Award for his work to strengthen democracy at the local level. In addition, the California Minority Counsel Program (CMCP) awarded the Office of the City Attorney the John Essex and Guy Rounsaville In-House Diversity Counsel Award for demonstrating superior commitment to diversity; it was the first time a public agency had received the honor in the thirteen-year history of the program.

In 2003, California Lawyer Magazine named John Russo as Attorney of the Year for Government/Public Policy. The eighth annual CLAY (California Lawyer Attorneys of the Year) Awards for 2003 recognized City Attorney Russo for his advocacy and innovation in public law while saving taxpayer money.

As lead defense counsel for the city of Oakland, Russo settled a civil suit alleging widespread police misconduct for $10.8 million, only $2.2 million of which came from taxpayers, with the rest paid by excess insurers. Despite this payout, he managed to reduce city spending on lawyers and lawsuits by $3.5 million compared with the previous fiscal year. On the local level, Russo's innovative, privately funded Neighborhood Law Corps helped overcome blight by, among other things, entering an agreement with Union Pacific Railroad to clean up illegally dumped trash along railroad tracks, which will save the city hundreds of thousands of dollars in cleanup costs over the ten-year period of the agreement.

The award also recognized Russo for winning an appellate ruling upholding the city's anti-predatory lending ordinance and successfully petitioning California Insurance Commissioner John Garamendi to investigate ZIP Code discrimination in auto insurance.

There are some achievements made by California lawyers that have such far-reaching impact that they cannot go unrecognized," said the magazine's editors. "The lawyers selected as Attorneys of the Year for 2003 substantially influenced public policy or a particular industry, brought about a significant development in their field of practice or in law-firm management, or achieved a notable victory for a client or for the public in a difficult, high-stakes matter."

In the fall of 2003, John Russo received the California First Amendment Coalition's Beacon Award for leadership in promoting public access to government and going "beyond the norm to assure government transparency."
