= Rosso (surname) =

Rosso is a surname of Italian origin, which means "red (haired)".

== Geographical distribution ==
As of 2014, 45.5% of all known bearers of the surname Rosso were residents of Italy (frequency 1:2,279), 13.4% of Argentina (1:5,407), 9.7% of Brazil (1:35,898), 6.8% of the United States (1:89,908), 6.0% of France (1:18,766), 4.9% of the Dominican Republic (1:3,613), 2.9% of Colombia (1:27,711), 1.7% of Bolivia (1:10,735), 1.4% of Uruguay (1:4,175) and 1.1% of Spain (1:73,139).

In Italy, the frequency of the surname was higher than the national average (1:2,279) in the following regions:

1. Piedmont (1:253)
2. Liguria (1:881)
3. Friuli-Venezia Giulia (1:884)
4. Veneto (1:2,032)

In Argentina, the frequency of the surname was higher than the national average (1:5,407) in the following provinces:

1. Córdoba Province (1:1,667)
2. Santa Fe Province (1:1,733)
3. San Luis Province (1:2,332)
4. La Pampa Province (1:2,962)
5. Formosa Province (1:3,927)

In Uruguay, the frequency of the surname was higher than the national average (1:4,175) in the following departments:

1. Soriano (1:654)
2. Florida (1:1,228)
3. Canelones (1:2,608)
4. Río Negro (1:2,716)

== People ==
- Antonio De Rosso (1941–2009), head of the Orthodox Church in Italy and the Metropolitan of Ravenna and Italy
- Camilla and Rebecca Rosso (born 1994), British former actresses and singers
- Elena Martínez Rosso, Uruguayan judge
- Franco Rosso (1941–2016), Italian-born film producer and director
- Frank Rosso (1921–1980), American baseball player
- George Rosso (1930–1994), American professional football player
- Giovanni Rosso (born 1972), Croatian professional football player
- John Rosso, Papua New Guinea politician
- Julee Rosso (contemporary), American cook and food writer
- Medardo Rosso (1858–1928), Italian sculptor
- Nini Rosso (1926–1994), Italian jazz trumpeter and composer
- Patrick Rosso (born 1969), French judoka
- Ramón Rosso (born 1996), Dominican Republic professional baseball player
- Renzo Rosso (born 1955), Italian clothing designer; co-founder of the Diesel clothing company
- Stefano Rosso (1948–2008), Italian songwriter and guitarist

== See also ==
- Rossi (surname)
- Ríos (disambiguation)
- Russo
- Merrick and Rosso, an Australian comedy duo, Merrick Watts and Tim Ross
