= Enrico Rossi (painter) =

Italian painter

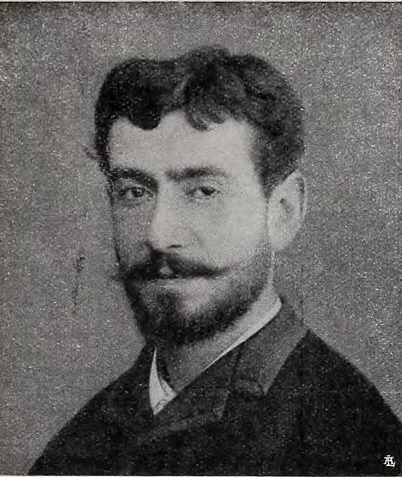
- Born: 8 September 1856; Naples
- Died: 18 February 1916
- Occupation: Painter

Enrico Rossi (8 September 1856 in Naples – 1916) was an Italian painter.

He studied painting at the Royal Institute of Fine Arts of Naples under the direction of professors Domenico Morelli and Filippo Palizzi. He won a series of awards for figure paintings in Milan and at the Promotrice of Naples. In Milan, he had two genre subjects. Giulia Masucci was one of his pupils. He also illustrated books including a Collection of Neapolitan Songs by Salvatore Di Giacomo
