= Enrico Rossi Chauvenet =

Italian footballer (born 1984)

Enrico Rossi
Personal information
- Full name: Enrico Rossi Chauvenet
- Date of birth: 4 June 1984 (age 42)
- Place of birth: Padua, Italy
- Height: 1.85 m (6 ft 1 in)
- Position: Goalkeeper

Team information
- Current team: Vigontina San Paolo

Youth career
- ?–2004: Padova
- 2001–2003: → Internazionale (loan)

Senior career*
Years	Team	Apps	(Gls)
2004–2005	Padova	0	(0)
2005–2007	Venezia	2	(0)
2006	→ Verona (loan)	0	(0)
2007	→ Torres (loan)	5	(0)
2007–2008	Mezzocorona	33	(0)
2008–2010	Monza	29	(0)
2010–2011	Pergocrema	12	(0)
2011	Bassano Virtus	0	(0)
2011–2013	Marano	?	(0)
2013–2016	Abano	26+	(0)
2016–	Vigontina San Paolo	0	(0)

International career
2005	Italy Mediterranean	2	(0)
- * Club domestic league appearances and goals

Enrico Rossi Chauvenet (born 4 June 1984) is an Italian footballer who plays as a goalkeeper.

== Club career ==
=== Youth career ===
Rossi Chauvenet started his career at his hometown club Padova. He also spent 2 seasons at Internazionale's Primavera U20 Youth Team, where he won the league title, along with Mathieu Moreau as Alex Cordaz's backup. In the 2002–03 season, Rossi remained at Primavera team and occasionally played for first team in club friendlies. That season Rossi competed with Moreau and Nathan Coe as first choice, which Rossi played both legs of Campionato Primavera round of 16, while Coe played in quarter-final, semi-final and final, which Inter lost to Lecce. While Moreau played at 2003 Torneo di Viareggio. After the season, Rossi Chauvenet returned to Padova and in 2004–05 season as Roberto Colombo's backup.

=== Lega Pro career ===
In 2005–06, Rossi Chauvenet left for Serie C2 side S.S.C. Venezia, which had just been refounded to replace the bankrupt AC Venezia. He was the backup of Massimo Lotti along with Tiziano Ramon. In the mid-season, he left for Serie B side Verona on loan, as Gianluca Pegolo's backup, along with Jess Vanstrattan. In the 2006–07 season, he returned to Venice, as Giuseppe Aprea's backup along with Lotti and in mid-season exchanged with Stefano Layeni of Serie C2 side Torres, where he played as Simone Deliperi's backup.

In the 2007–08 season, he left for Mezzocorona, where he finally played as first choice, ahead of Massimo Macchi, the first choice of last season. In the 2008–09 season, he played for the Prima Divisione side Monza, ahead of Giacomo Bindi and Matteo Apuzzo as first choice. Since the signing of ex-Dutch international Sander Westerveld, Rossi Chauvenet became backup again. In January 2010, he left for fellow third division club Pergocrema, ahead young keeper Simone Colombi as first choice since February. In 2011, his professional career ended, though he continued playing with non-professional clubs like Bassano Virtus, Marano, Abano and Vigontina San Paolo until 2017.

== International career ==
Rossi Chauvenet received his only call-up for the Italy U19 in September 2002, as Andrea Ivaldi's backup. The teammate Alessandro Potenza also played. He also call-up to Serie C U20 selection for 2004–05 Mirop Cup along with Luca Rossettini.

In 2005, he was called up to the Italy U21 B team specifically for the 2005 Mediterranean Games and for a preparation match against Serie D Best XI before the tournament. He played his only match with the team against Libya.
