= Laura Russo (librarian) =

- Born: Laura Garcia Moreno Russo; February 20, 1915; Rio de Janeiro, Brazil
- Died: April 30, 2001 (aged 86); São Paulo, Brazil
- Occupation: Librarian

Laura Garcia Moreno Russo (Rio de Janeiro, RJ, Brazil, February 20, 1915 − São Paulo, SP, Brazil, April 30, 2001) was a Brazilian librarian who had a fundamental role in the creation and approval of organizations and legislation that would regulate the practice of librarianship in Brazil.

Laura Russo was one of the people responsible for the regulation of the librarian profession. She was the founder and first president of the Federação Brasileira de Associações de Bibliotecários (FEBAB) and of the Conselho Federal de Biblioteconomia (CFB). As a librarian, she worked at the Santa Casa de Misericórdia de São Paulo, at the Academia Paulista de Letras, at the Biblioteca Mário de Andrade, among other institutions.

== Education ==
Laura Russo obtained a bachelor's degree in Library Science in 1942 from the Escola Livre de Sociologia e Política. In 1959, she got a degree in Documentation from the same institution.

In 1958 she got a master's degree in Library and Archival Science from the National Library of Spain.

During the 1960s, she took courses in Library Science in the United States.

In 1975, she obtained a bachelor's degree in Law from the Universidade de São Paulo.

== Career ==
Russo worked as a librarian at Santa Casa from 1942 to 1950, working specifically at the First Surgical Clinic for Women from 1950 to 1952. In 1947 she received an award from the Associação Paulista de Bibliotecários for her work with hospital libraries. In 1951, she founded the circulating library Prof. Celestino Bourroul for the hospital patients.

Russo worked as a librarian for the Municipal Library System of São Paulo. From 1942 to 1959, she worked in the Acquisitions department of the Mário de Andrade Library. From 1959 to 1961, she was the head of the Child Psychology Section of the Monteiro Lobato Library, returning to Mário de Andrade's Acquisition department as chief librarian from 1961 to 1968. In 1968, she became Library Director of Mário de Andrade Library.

From 1955 to 1957, Russo was the librarian at Casa Cervantes, receiving an award from the institution in 1957 for her work.

=== Professional associations ===
In 1959, Russo gave a presentation with Rodolfo Rocha Júnior at the II Congresso de Biblioteconomia e Documentação in Salvador, Bahia, that would lead to the creation of the Federação Brasileira de Associações de Bibliotecários (FEBAB). She was nominated as FEBAB's first director in 1961.

Russo worked as editor of FEBAB's bulletin from 1961 to 1970, and as editor for the Revista Brasileira de Biblioteconomia e Documentação from 1973 to 1977.

In 1966, Russo participated in the creation of the Conselho Federal de Biblioteconomia (CFB) and the Regional Councils (Conselhos Regionais). She was elected as CFB's first president.

=== Legislation and regulation of the profession ===
With the assistance of Maria Helena Brandão, Russo wrote the document that would become the Law 4.084 of 1962, defining the profession of the librarian and regulating its exercise.

Ultimately, the goal of the legislation was to create a market reserve for librarians, guaranteeing that only those with a bachelor's in Library Science could practice the profession. It was believed that this would bring greater visibility and respect for the profession.

In 1962, she received an award from the Associação Paulista de Bibliotecários for her work with Law 4.084/62.

=== Code of ethics ===
Laura Russo wrote the first version of the Librarian Professional Code of Ethics in 1961. The code would be approved in 1963, achieving legal status in 1966 and falling under the responsibility of CFB.

== Laura Russo Award ==
As a tribute to her professional work, the Regional Council of Librarianship of the State of São Paulo (CRB-8) created the Laura Russo Prize in 1998, that aims to recognize cultural initiatives and encourage the use of the library and library services.

== Notable publications ==
- RUSSO, Laura Garcia Moreno. A biblioteconomia brasileira, 1915-1965. Instituto National do Livro, 1966.
