= John Russo (baseball) =

American baseball coach (born 1973)

Biographical details
- Born: November 10, 1973 (age 52)
- Education: West Alabama

Coaching career (HC unless noted)
- 1998–2000: West Alabama (Asst.)
- 2001–2005: Saint Joseph's (IN) (Asst.)
- 2008–2011: Hofstra (Asst.)
- 2012–2021: Hofstra

Head coaching record
- Overall: 190–262
- Tournaments: CAA: 1-4; NCAA: 0–0

John Russo (born November 10, 1973) is an American baseball coach. He graduated from the University of West Alabama in 2000. Russo served as an assistant coach at West Alabama while completing a degree in secondary education and a concentration in physical education. He worked with the Tigers hitters from 1998 until his graduation in 2000, helping them set several program records. He then moved to Saint Joseph's in Rensselaer, Indiana, serving as infield coach and academic advisor for his five seasons. From 2005 to 2008, Russo worked as a teacher and athletic director in Wadsworth, Illinois. During his summers, Russo coached the Vermont Mountaineers of the New England Collegiate Baseball League. He led the Mountaineers to the 2006 and 2007 NECBL Championship. In 2008, Russo earned the top assistant coaching position at Hofstra Pride. After Patrick Anderson's resignation to work for the Hagerstown Suns just before the 2012, season, Russo became interim head coach, and was named to the position permanently after leading the Pride to a second-place finish in the CAA.

== Head coaching record ==
Record table
Season	Team	Overall	Conference	Standing	Postseason
Hofstra Pride (Colonial Athletic Association) (2012–2021)
2012	Hofstra	34–22	20–10	2nd (11)	CAA Tournament (Note: The top 6 finishers of the CAA's 11 teams qualified for the tournament in 2012.)
2013	Hofstra	26–27	11–16	9th (10)	
2014	Hofstra	20–24	7–12	7th (8)	
2015	Hofstra	19–29	6–18	9th (9)	
2016	Hofstra	15–37	5–18	9th (9)	
2017	Hofstra	14–37	7–17	T-7th (9)	
2018	Hofstra	23–23	12–12	6th (9)	CAA Tournament
2019	Hofstra	18–31–1	10–14	7th	
2020	Hofstra	4–10	0–0		Season canceled due to COVID-19
2021	Hofstra	17–22	8–16	3rd (North)	
Hofstra:		190–262–1	86–133		
Total:		190–262			
National champion Postseason invitational champion Conference regular season champion Conference regular season and conference tournament champion Division regular season champion Division regular season and conference tournament champion Conference tournament champion
