= Sleepless =

Sleepless may refer to:

== Film and television ==
- Sleepless (1957 film), an Egyptian drama film by Salah Abu Seif
- Sleepless (2001 film), a horror film of 2001 by Dario Argento
- Sleepless (2017 film), a 2017 American crime-drama film
- "Sleepless" (The X-Files), a 1994 episode of the television show The X-Files

== Literature ==
- Sleepless (novel), a novel by Charlie Huston
- La Anam (novel), a 1956 Arabic novel by Ihsan Abdel Quddous, which the aforementioned film adapts
- Sleepless (comics), a comic book by Sarah Vaughn and Leila del Duca
- The Sleepless trilogy of novels by Nancy Kress

== Music ==
=== Albums ===
- Sleepless (Kate Rusby album), 1999
- Sleepless (Jacksoul album), 2000
- Sleepless (Peter Wolf album), 2002
- Sleepless (Adept album), 2016
- Sleepless: The Concise King Crimson, an album by King Crimson

=== Songs ===
- "Sleepless" (King Crimson song), 1984
- "Sleepless" (Eric Saade song), 2009
- "Sleepless" (Flume song), 2011
- "Sleepless" (Cazzette song), 2014
- "Sleepless", a song by Anathema from Serenades, 1993
  - Covered by Cradle of Filth, 1999
- "Sleepless", a song by Soul Coughing from Irresistible Bliss, 1996
- "Sleepless", a song by Jann Arden from Blood Red Cherry, 2000
- "Sleepless", a song by Despised Icon from Day of Mourning, 2009
- "Sleepless", a song by deadmau5 from Album Title Goes Here, 2012
- "Sleepless", a song by Northlane from Alien, 2019
- "Sleepless", a song by B'z from Highway X, 2022

== See also ==
- Insomnia, a sleeping disorder characterized by persistent difficulty falling or staying asleep
