= Omar Sharif =

Egyptian actor (1932–2015)

Omar Sharif OME
- عمر الشريف
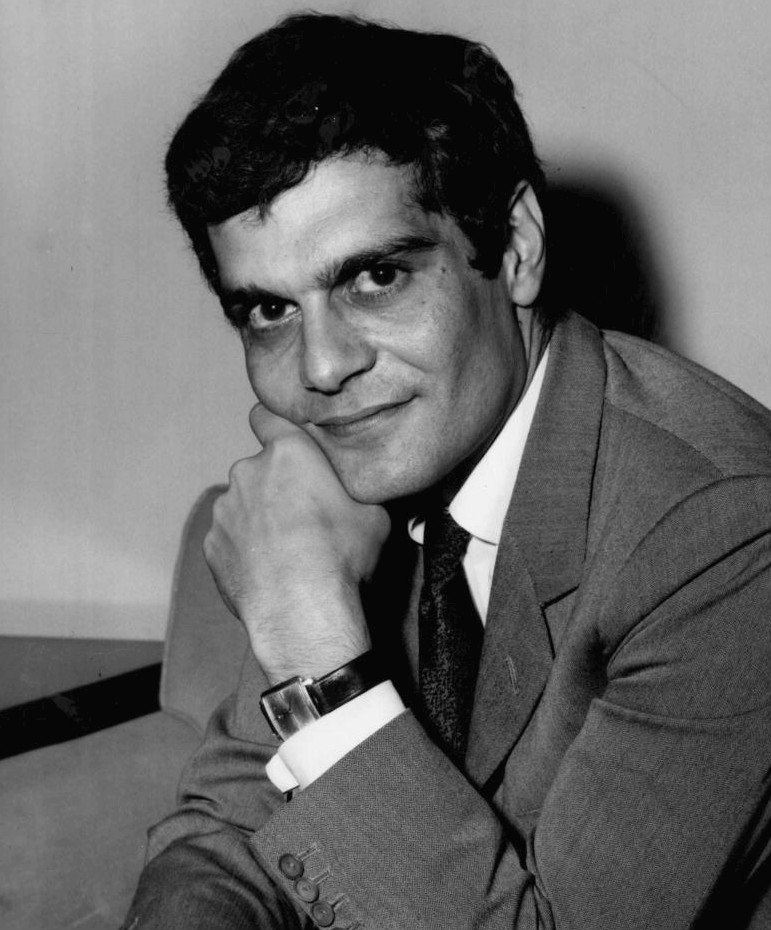
- Sharif in 1963
- Born: Michel Yusef Dimitri Chalhoub; 10 April 1932; Alexandria, Kingdom of Egypt
- Died: 10 July 2015 (aged 83); Cairo, Egypt
- Burial place: Al-Sayyida Nafisa Cemetery, Cairo, Egypt
- Other names: Omar el-Sherief; Omar Cherif
- Education: Victoria College, Alexandria; Cairo University
- Occupations: Actor; bridge player
- Years active: 1954–2015
- Spouse: Faten Hamama (m. 1955; div. 1974)
- Children: 1
- Relatives: Omar Sharif Jr. (grandson)
- Awards: César Award (2004); Golden Globe Award (1962, 1963, 1965)
- Honours: Order of Merit

Signature
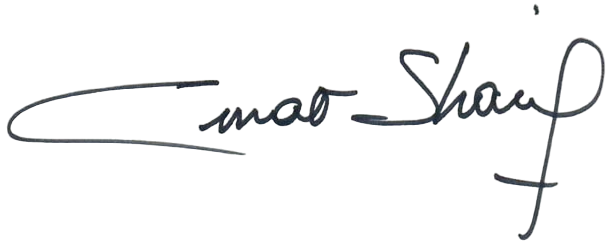

Omar Sharif (Note: Historically spelt Omar el-Sherief and Omar Cherif; Arabic: عمر الشريف, Egyptian Arabic pronunciation: [ˈʕomɑɾ eʃʃɪˈɾiːf].) (born Michel Yusef Dimitri Chalhoub; (Note: Arabic: ميشيل يوسف ديمتري شلهوب, pronounced [miˈʃel ˈjuːsɪf dɪˈmitɾi ʃælˈhuːb].) 10 April 1932 – 10 July 2015) was an Egyptian actor, generally regarded as his country's greatest male film star. He began his career in Egypt in the early 1950s. He is best known for his appearances in American, British, French, and Italian productions, and has been described as "the first Egyptian to conquer Hollywood". His career encompassed over 100 films spanning 50 years, and brought him many accolades including three Golden Globe Awards and a César Award for Best Actor.

Sharif played opposite Peter O'Toole as Sherif Ali in the David Lean epic Lawrence of Arabia (1962), which earned him an Academy Award nomination for Best Supporting Actor, and portrayed the title role in Lean's Doctor Zhivago (1965), earning him the Golden Globe for Best Actor – Motion Picture Drama. He continued to play romantic leads in films like Funny Girl (1968) and The Tamarind Seed (1974) and historical figures like the eponymous characters in Genghis Khan (1965), The Mamelukes (1965), and Che! (1969). His acting career continued well into old age, with a well-received turn as a Muslim Turkish immigrant in the French film Monsieur Ibrahim (2003). Sharif made his final film appearance in 2015, the year of his death.

Sharif spoke five languages: Arabic, English, French, Italian and Spanish. He bridled at travel restrictions imposed by the government of Egyptian president Gamal Abdel Nasser in the 1960s. He was a lifelong horse racing enthusiast, and at one time ranked among the world's top contract bridge players. He was the recipient of high civil honors from multiple countries, including the Egyptian Order of Merit and the French Legion of Honour. He was one of only 25 grantees of UNESCO's Sergei Eisenstein Medal, in recognition of his significant contributions to world film and cultural diversity.

== Early life ==
Sharif was born Michel Yusef Dimitri Chalhoub (Arabic: ميشيل يوسف ديمتري شلهوب ) in Alexandria, Kingdom of Egypt (now Republic of Egypt), to a Melkite Greek Catholic family of Syro-Lebanese descent. Although most sources claim he was of both Syrian and Lebanese descent, Sharif stated in interviews that all of his ancestors were of Syrian descent, making him and his family members of the Antiochian Greek Christian minority (also known as Rūm). He adopted the surname Sharif, meaning "noble" or "nobleman" in Arabic, after he was picked by Egyptian director Youssef Chahine to star in his film The Blazing Sun. He later converted to Islam and changed his name legally in order to marry Faten Hamama.

His father, Yusef Chalhoub, a precious woods merchant, moved to the port city of Alexandria with his mother in the early 20th century from Zahlé. Sharif was later born in Alexandria. His family moved to Cairo when he was four. His mother, Claire Saada, was a noted society hostess, in whose house Egypt's King Farouk was a regular visitor prior to his deposition in 1952.

In his youth, Sharif studied at Victoria College, Alexandria, where he showed a talent for languages, He befriended fellow actor Ahmed Ramzy and Youssef Chahine in school. He later graduated from Cairo University with a degree in mathematics and physics. He worked for a while in his father's precious wood business before beginning his acting career in Egypt. In 1955, he adopted the stage name "Omar Sharif". He married fellow Egyptian actress Faten Hamama.

It has been widely reported that Sharif studied acting at the Royal Academy of Dramatic Art in London, but the academy told Al Jazeera that this was not true.

== Acting career ==
=== Egyptian film star ===
Sharif began his acting career in Egypt with a role in The Blazing Sun (1954). He was also in The Devil of the Desert (1954). Sharif quickly rose to stardom, appearing in Our Beautiful Days (1955), The Lebanese Mission (1956) (a French film), Struggle in the Pier (1956), Sleepless (1957), Land of Peace (1957), and Goha (1958) (a Tunisian film that marked the debut of Claudia Cardinale).

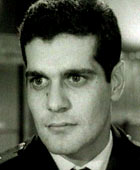
Sharif in There is a Man in our House (1961)

He also starred in Sayyidat al-Qasr (1958), A Beginning and an End (1960), A Rumor of Love (1960), and the Anna Karenina adaptation The River of Love by Ezz El-Dine Zulficar (1960). He and his wife, Faten Hamama, co-starred in several films as romantic leads. Sharif achieved success through other movies like Struggle on the Nile (1959), A Rumor of Love (1960), and There is a Man in our House (1961), which made him a huge competitor to Salah Zulfikar, Shoukry Sarhan and Rushdy Abaza, the Egyptian cinema giants at the time.

=== Lawrence of Arabia ===
Sharif's first English-language role was that of the fictitious Sherif Ali in David Lean's historical epic Lawrence of Arabia in 1962. Sharif was given the role when Dilip Kumar turned it down, Horst Buchholz proved unavailable and Maurice Ronet could not use the contact lenses necessary to mask his eye colour.

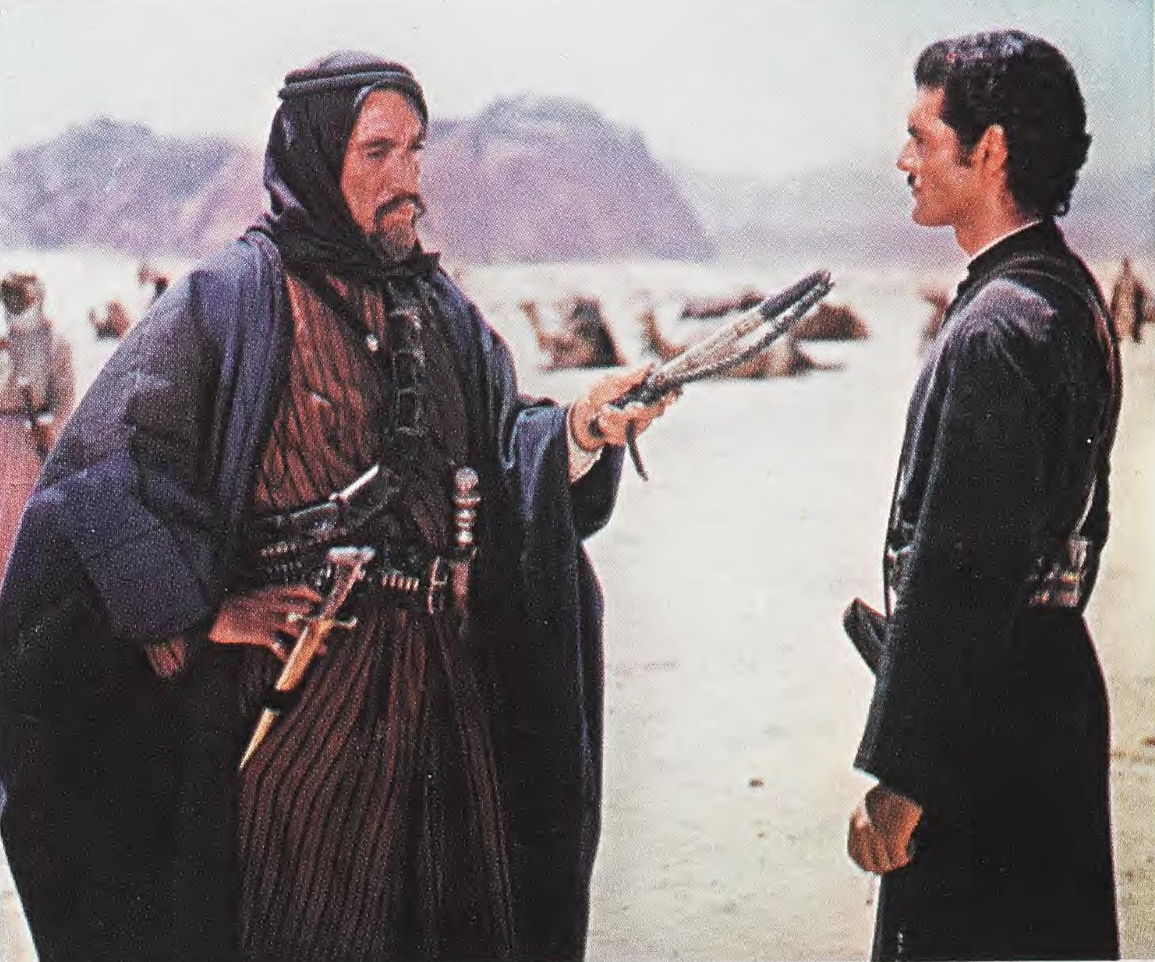
Sharif and Anthony Quinn in Lawrence of Arabia (1962)

Casting Sharif in what is now considered one of the "most demanding supporting roles in Hollywood history" was both complex and risky as he was virtually unknown at the time outside Egypt. As historian Steven Charles Caton notes, Lean insisted on using ethnic actors when possible to make the film authentic. Sharif later used his ambiguous ethnicity in other films: "I spoke French, Greek, Italian, Spanish and even Arabic", he said. As Sharif noted, his accent enabled him to "play the role of a foreigner without anyone knowing exactly where I came from", which he stated proved highly successful throughout his career. To secure the role, Sharif had to sign a seven-film contract with Columbia at $50,000 a film.

Lawrence of Arabia was a box office and critical sensation. Sharif's performance earned him an Academy Award for Best Supporting Actor nomination and a Golden Globe Award for Best Supporting Actor – Motion Picture, as well as a shared Golden Globe Award for New Star of the Year – Actor.

Sharif went on to star in another Hollywood film, Anthony Mann's The Fall of the Roman Empire (1964) where he played the support role of Sohaemus of Armenia. Sharif was third-billed in Columbia's Behold a Pale Horse (1964), playing a priest in the Spanish Civil War alongside Gregory Peck and Anthony Quinn. Director Fred Zinnemann said he chose Sharif partly on the suggestion of David Lean. "He said he was an absolutely marvellous actor, 'If you possibly can, take a look at him.'" Film historian Richard Schickel wrote that Sharif gave a "truly wonderful performance", especially noteworthy because of his totally different role in Lawrence of Arabia: "It is hard to believe that the priest and the sheik are played by the same man". The film, like Fall of the Roman Empire, was a commercial disappointment.

Sharif was one of many stars in MGM's The Yellow Rolls-Royce (1964), playing a Yugoslav wartime patriot; the movie was a hit. He had his first lead role in a Hollywood film when he was cast in the title part of Genghis Khan (1965). Produced by Irving Allen and directed by Henry Levin for Columbia, the $4.5 million epic was a box office disappointment. He had a supporting role in a French Marco Polo biopic, Marco the Magnificent (1965), starring Buchholz and Quinn.

=== Doctor Zhivago ===
While making Genghis Khan, Sharif heard that Lean was making Doctor Zhivago (1965), an adaptation of Boris Pasternak's 1957 novel. Sharif was a fan of the novel and lobbied for one of the supporting roles, but Lean decided instead to cast him in the lead as Yuri Zhivago, a poet and physician.

Film historian Constantine Santas explained that Lean intended the film to be a poetic portrayal of the period, with large vistas of landscapes combined with a powerful score by Maurice Jarre. He noted that Sharif's role is "passive", his eyes reflecting "reality" which then become "the mirror of reality we ourselves see".

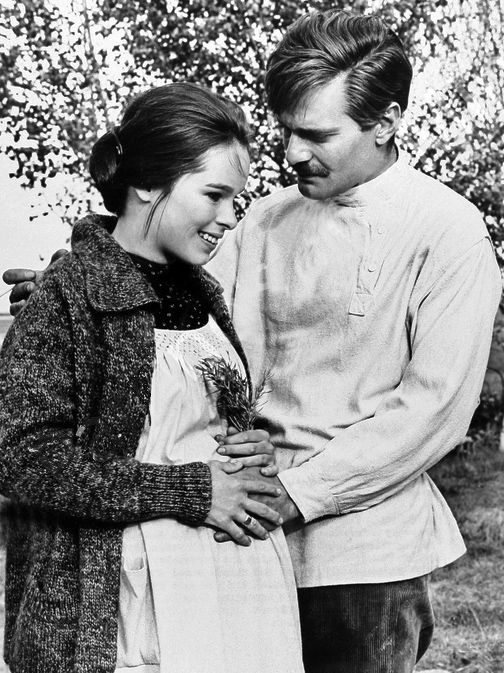
With Geraldine Chaplin in Doctor Zhivago (1965).

While filming the Siberian sections of the film in Joensuu, Finland, Sharif was said to have admired the snowy landscapes and been a guest at a local bridge club, and the locals who liked him nicknamed him "Safiiri" (lit. 'Sapphire'). In a commentary on the DVD (2001 edition), Sharif described Lean's style of directing as similar to a general commanding an army. The film was a huge hit. For his performance, Sharif won a Golden Globe Award for Best Actor – Motion Picture Drama. Doctor Zhivago remains one of the top ten highest-grossing films of all time after adjusting for inflation.

Sharif followed it with a cameo in The Poppy Is Also a Flower (1966). He was reunited with Lawrence co-star Peter O'Toole and producer Sam Spiegel for The Night of the Generals (1967). His fourth movie for Columbia, Sharif played a German officer in World War II. The film was not a success, nor was the Italian-French fairytale More Than a Miracle (1967), despite featuring Sophia Loren as co-star.

=== Funny Girl ===
Sharif was also praised for his portrayal of Nicky Arnstein in Funny Girl (1968) for Columbia Pictures. He portrayed the husband of Fanny Brice, played by Barbra Streisand in her first film role. His decision to work alongside Streisand angered Egypt's government because she was a vocal supporter of the State of Israel, and the country condemned the film. It was also "immediately banned" in numerous Arab nations. Streisand herself jokingly responded, "You think Cairo was upset? You should've seen the letter I got from my Aunt Rose!"

Sharif and Streisand became romantically involved during the filming. He admitted later that he did not find Streisand attractive at first, but her appeal soon overwhelmed him: "About a week from the moment I met her," he recalled, "I was madly in love with her. I thought she was the most gorgeous girl I'd ever seen in my life...I found her physically beautiful, and I started lusting after this woman."

=== Other films ===
The Mamelukes (1965), an Egyptian epic film with Nabila Ebeid and Emad Hamdy, had a high publicity, was not a hit in Egyptian box office despite being his first in Egyptian cinema since the 1961 film There is a Man in Our House. Sharif co-starred with Catherine Deneuve in Mayerling (1968), and the following year was reunited with Gregory Peck in the western, Mackenna's Gold (1969), an unsuccessful attempt to repeat the success of The Guns of Navarone (1961).

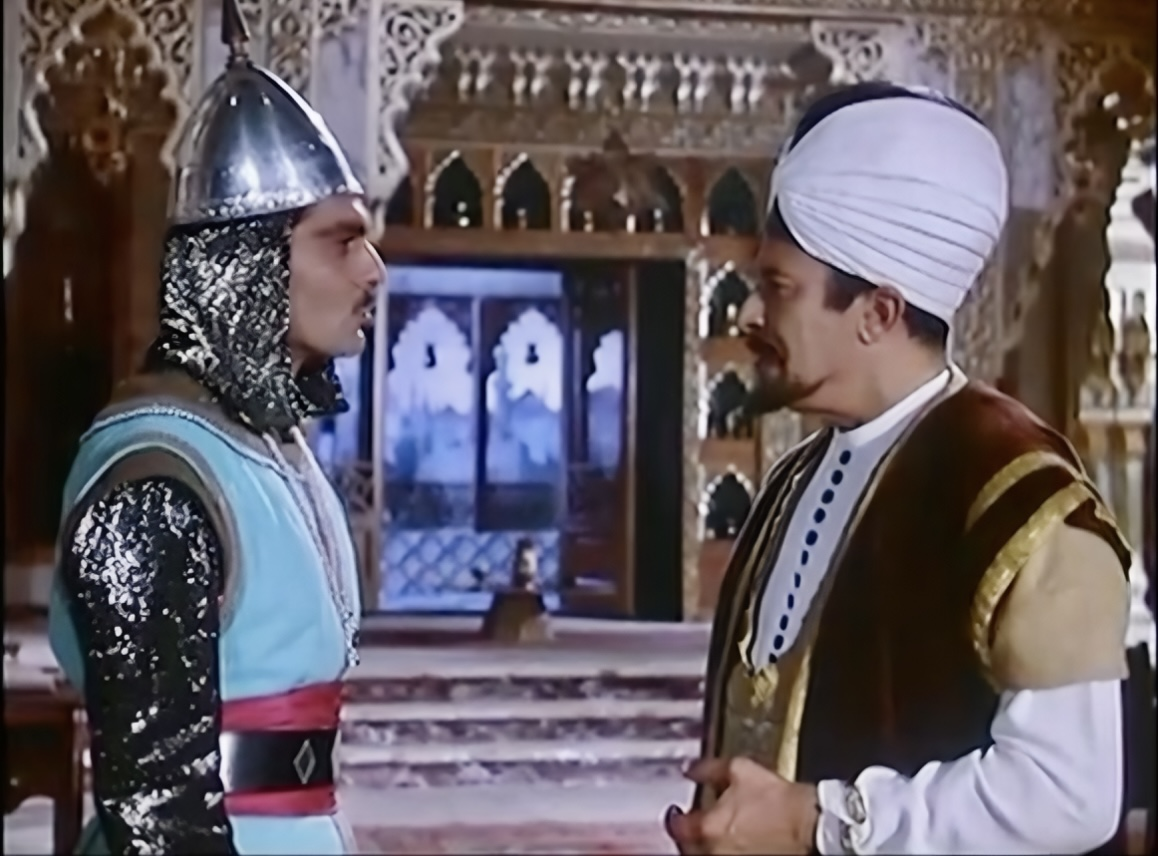
Sharif and Emad Hamdy in The Mamelukes (1965)

At 20th Century Fox he played Che Guevara in Che! which flopped at the box office. The Appointment (1969) teamed Sharif with Anouk Aimée and director Sidney Lumet, had strong international success. James Clavell's The Last Valley (1971) was a huge flop, despite co-starring Michael Caine. The Horsemen (1971), directed by John Frankenheimer and the last film under his Columbia contract, also performed poorly at the box office. Sharif later said, "What killed my career was appearing in a succession of films you wouldn't turn down. They were by good directors, but they were bad films." He specifically referenced Behold a Pale Horse, The Appointment and The Horsemen.

The Burglars (1971), a French crime film with Jean-Paul Belmondo and Dyan Cannon was a huge hit in France but little seen in the English speaking world. Sharif played Captain Nemo for European TV in an adaptation of Mysterious Island (1973).

He appeared in a romantic thriller alongside Julie Andrews for Blake Edwards, The Tamarind Seed (1974); it did well at the box office and the critics gave good reviews. He then supported Richard Harris and David Hemmings in a thriller, Juggernaut (1974). Sharif reprised the role of Nick Arnstein in the sequel to Funny Girl, Funny Lady, in 1975. He starred in a West German thriller Crime and Passion (1976) and had a cameo in Edwards' The Pink Panther Strikes Again (1976). Sharif had a small role in Ashanti (1979) and a bigger one in Bloodline (1979), starring Audrey Hepburn.

"I lost money on gambling, buying horses, things like that", he later said. "So I made those movies which I knew were rubbish... I'd call my agent and tell him to accept any part, just to bail myself out."

=== 1980s ===
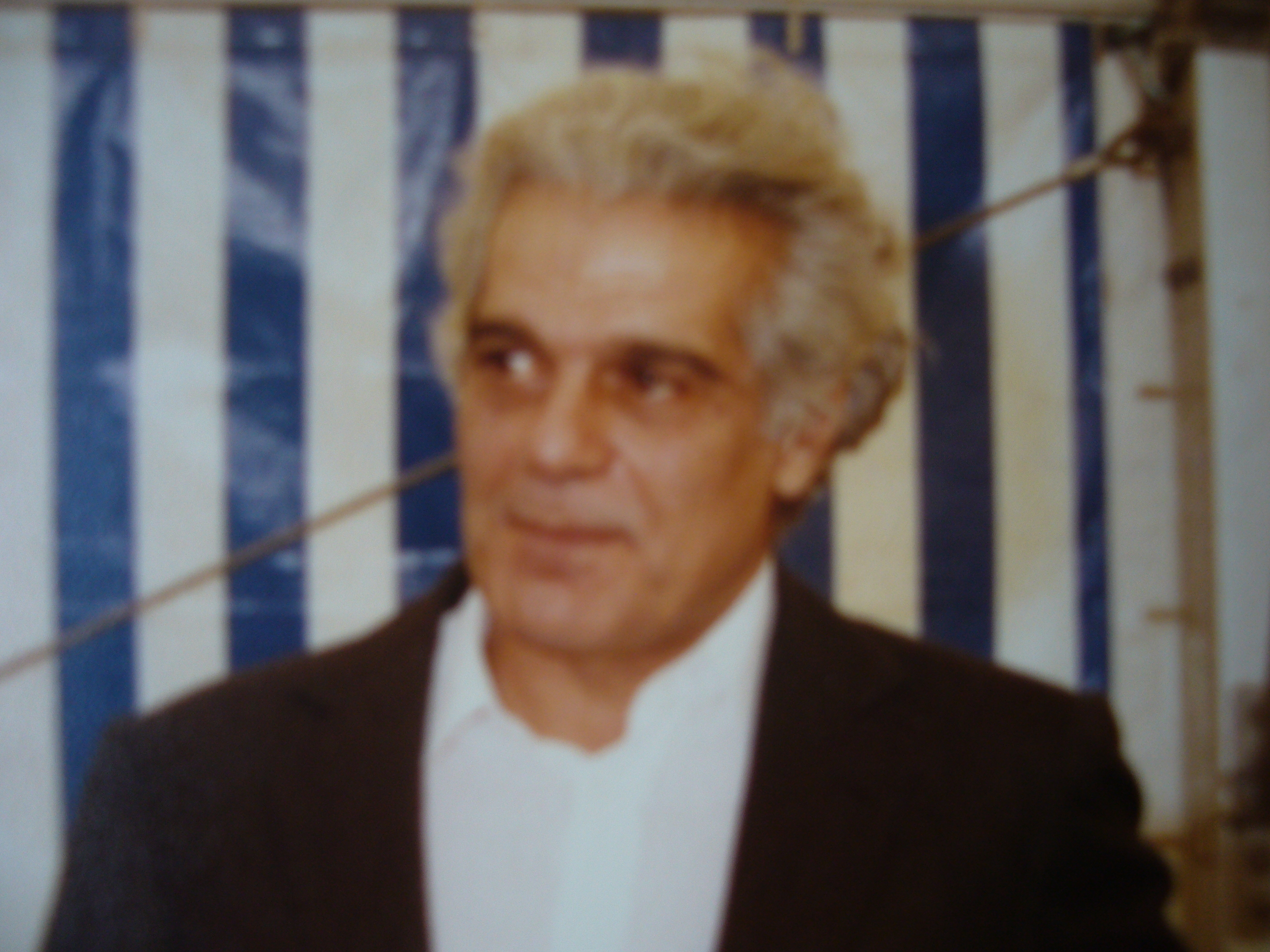
Sharif in 1983

Sharif had a lead part in a spy spoof, S*H*E (1980) and was second-billed (after James Coburn) in The Baltimore Bullet (1980). He had supporting parts in a Chevy Chase comedy Oh! Heavenly Dog (1981) and a Ryan O'Neal thriller Green Ice (1981) (which was made in the 1970s), and a small role in the comedy Top Secret! (1984).

He appeared on stage in a production of The Sleeping Prince in 1983, saying he "appeared in the bad films of great directors".

Sharif worked steadily in television, appearing in Pleasure Palace (1981), Ayoub (1983), Peter the Great (1986), and Anastasia: The Mystery of Anna (1986) (as Nicholas II of Russia). He had supporting parts in Grand Larceny (1987) and The Possessed (1988). His first notable credit in a while was Mountains of the Moon (1990) but Sharif's part was only small. He was the subject of This Is Your Life in 1989, when he was surprised by Michael Aspel outside his Paris apartment. In Egyptian cinema, he starred in The Puppeteer (1989) alongside Mervat Amin, where he played a role of a puppeteer living in rural Egypt.

=== 1990s ===
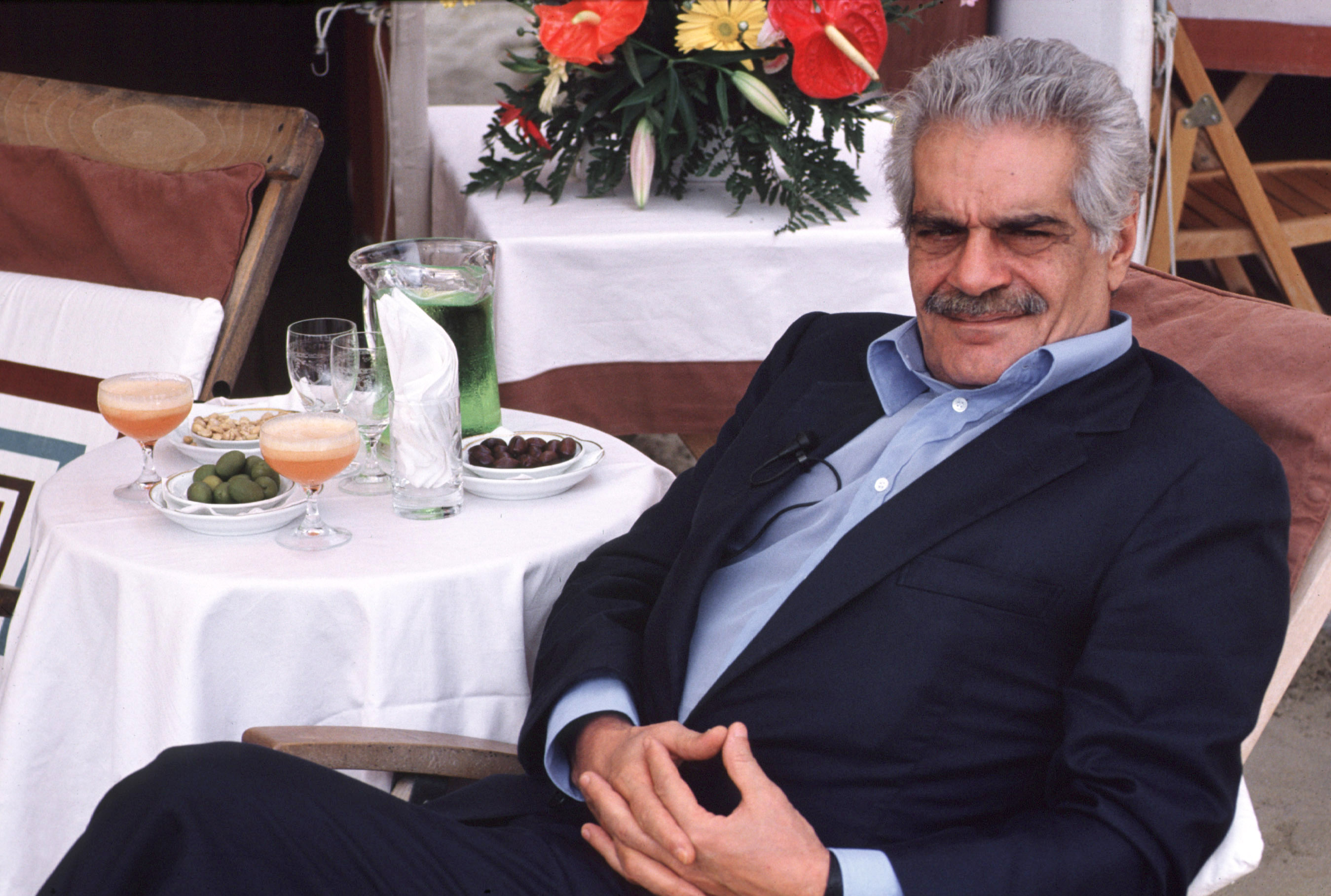
Sharif in 1993

Sharif was reunited with O'Toole again in The Rainbow Thief (1990). He went to Egypt for War in the Land of Egypt (1991) and France for Mayrig (1991) with Claudia Cardinale, an autobiographical tale for Henri Verneuil. The latter was popular enough for a sequel, 588 rue paradis (1992). Sharif could also be seen in Memories of Midnight (1991), Beyond Justice (1992), Catherine the Great (as Alexei Razumovsky), Gulliver's Travels (1996), Heaven Before I Die (1997), and Mysteries of Egypt (1998).

In 1996, Sharif starred in the documentary Lebanon...Imprisoned Splendour. The documentary was written and directed by Lebanese-Australian director Daizy Gedeon, who approached Sharif for the project because she wanted someone 'remarkable' to help her tell the true story of Lebanon: a country which, at the time, was still shrouded in the fog of its Civil War. In the film, Sharif shares personal stories of his upbringing, and recites the poetry of famous Lebanese poet Khalil Gibran.

He had his first decent role in a big Hollywood film in a long time with The 13th Warrior (1999). The outcome of the film's production disappointed Sharif so much that he temporarily retired from film acting, not taking a role in another major film until 2003's Monsieur Ibrahim:

I said to myself, 'Let us stop this nonsense, these meal tickets that we do because it pays well.' I thought, 'Unless I find a stupendous film that I love and that makes me want to leave home to do, I will stop.' Bad pictures are very humiliating, I was really sick. It is terrifying to have to do the dialogue from bad scripts, to face a director who does not know what he is doing, in a film so bad that it is not even worth exploring."

=== Monsieur Ibrahim and later films ===
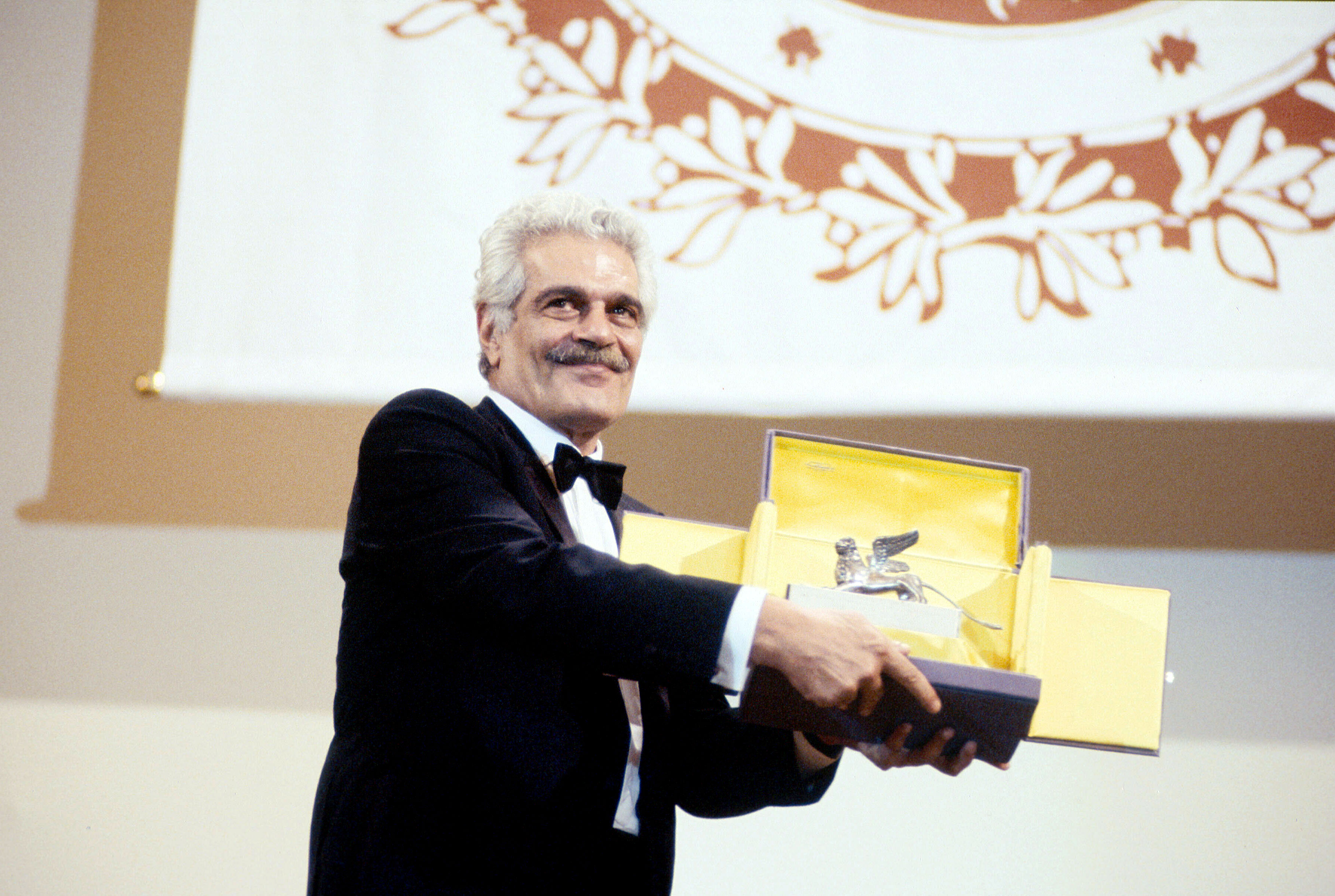
Omar Sharif receiving the Golden Lion at the Venice Film Festival (2003)

Sharif did have a small role in The Parole Officer (2001). In 2003 he said, "I went 25 years without making a good film."

In 2003, Sharif received acclaim for his leading role in Monsieur Ibrahim, a French-language film adaptation of the novel Monsieur Ibrahim et les fleurs du Coran, as a Muslim Turkish merchant who becomes a father figure for a Jewish boy. For this performance, Sharif received the César Award for Best Actor.

Sharif said of the film:

It has nice big chunks of dialogue, which is what I like to do, rather than riding horses or camels. I'd turned down everything and stopped working for four years. I said, 'I'm going to stop doing that rubbish and keep some dignity.' But when I read the script for 'Monsieur Ibrahim,' I phoned the producers immediately. I said, 'Hang on, I'm coming, wait for me.' My problem is finding parts. When you're young and successful, they write or adapt parts for you. But when you're an old chap, let's be frank, you don't sell tickets anymore. If they need an old Englishman, American or Italian, there are plenty of actors around. So what's open for me? Old Arabs. And that's what I play in this film.

Sharif's later film roles included performances in Hidalgo (2004), Imperium: Saint Peter (2005) playing the title role for Italian television, One Night with the King (2005) (again with O'Toole), and 10,000 BC (2008) as the narrator.

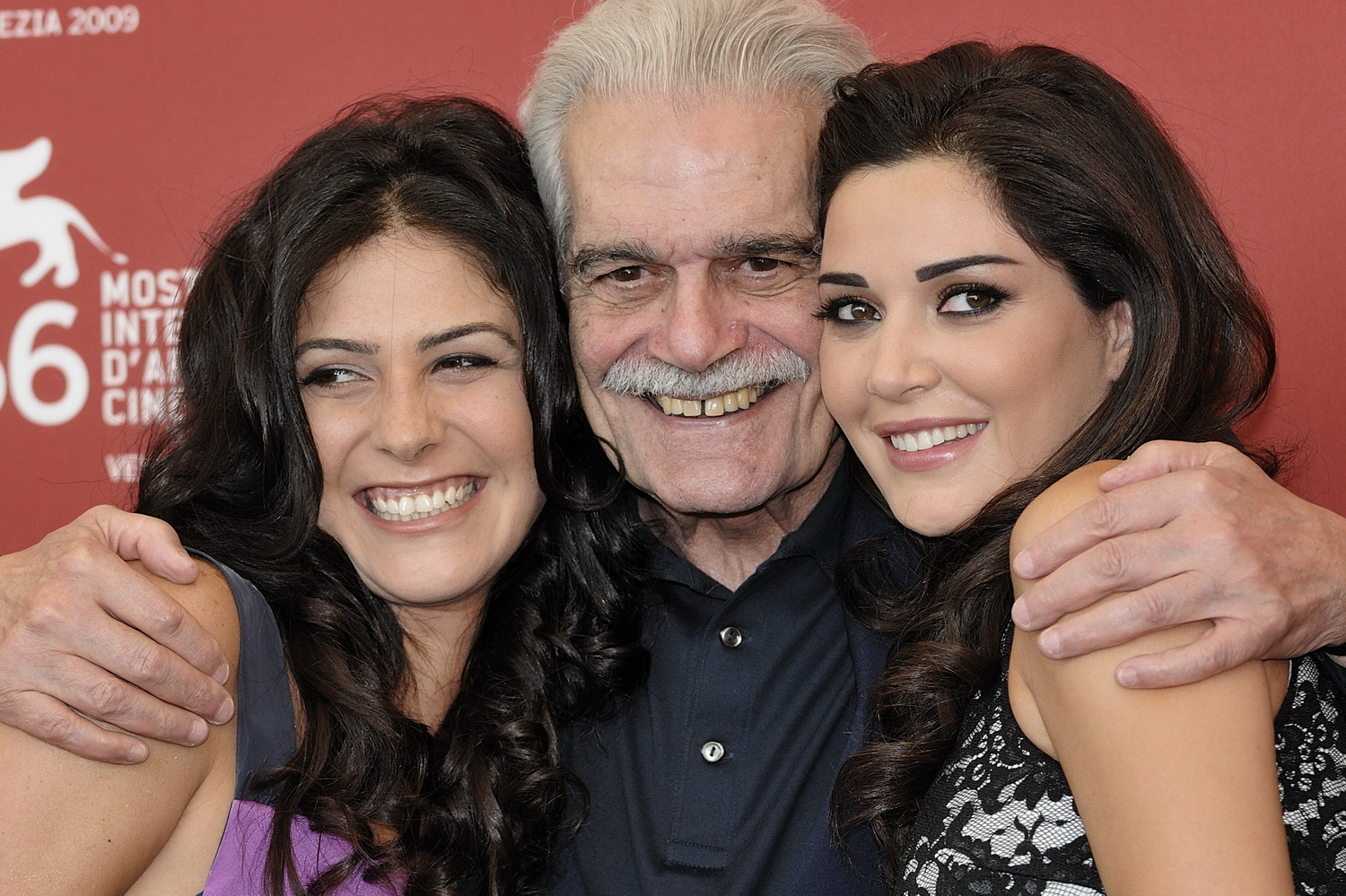
Sharif with Basma (left) and Cyrine Abdelnour attending the screening of The Traveller in Venice Film Festival in 2009

Sharif was seen in The Ten Commandments (2006). Also in 2006, Sharif played the artist Hans Canon in The Crown Prince, a film about Rudolf, the 19th century crown prince of the Austro-Hungarian Empire. In Egypt, he starred in Hassan and Marcus (2008) with Adel Emam and was in The Traveller (2009). He had support roles in The Last Templar (2009) and Rock the Casbah (2013).

Sharif's final role was as lead actor in the short science education film 1001 Inventions and the World of Ibn Al-Haytham, which was directed by Ahmed Salim and was released as part of the United Nations' International Year of Light campaign, operated by UNESCO.

== Contract bridge career ==
Sharif said bridge was his personal passion and at one time was ranked among the world's top 50 contract bridge players. At the 1964 World Bridge Olympiad he represented the United Arab Republic bridge squad and in 1968 he was playing captain of the Egyptian team in the Olympiad.

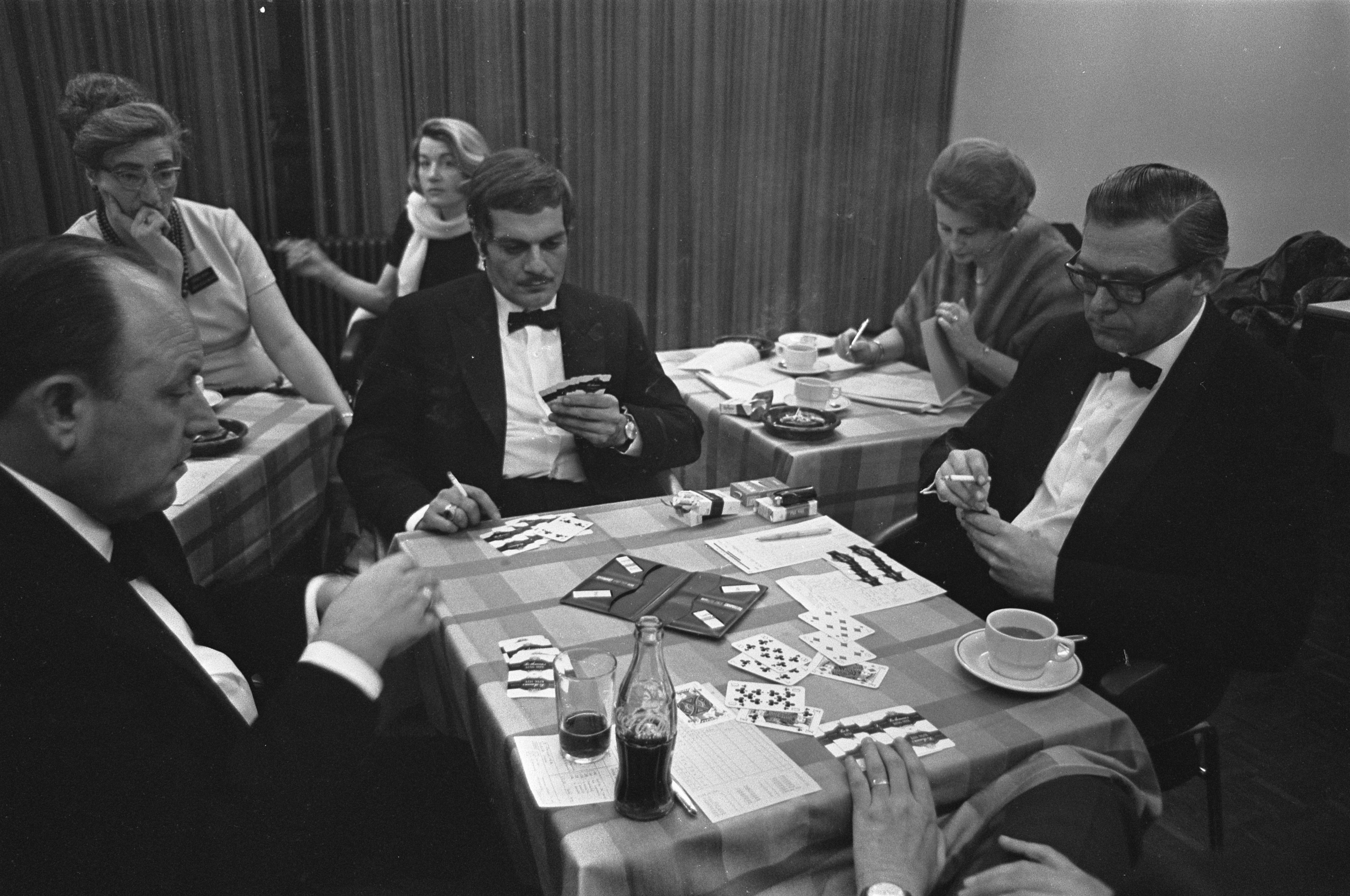
Sharif playing contract bridge in the Netherlands, 1967

In 1967, he formed the Omar Sharif Bridge Circus to showcase bridge to the world, and invited professional players including members of the Italian Blue team, which won 16 World championship titles, to tour and promote the game via exhibition matches including one watched by the Shah of Iran. Touring through Europe, the Circus attracted thousands of spectators who watched the matches via Bridge-O-Rama, a new technology and predecessor to the modern-day VuGraph, that displayed bidding and cardplay on television monitors. Players included Benito Garozzo, considered by many as the greatest bridge player of all time, plus his Italian compatriots Pietro Forquet and Giorgio Belladonna and Frenchman Claude Delmouly.

In 1970, Sharif and the Circus went to London's famous Piccadilly Hotel for an 80-rubber match against British experts Jeremy Flint and Jonathan Cansino. The stakes were £1 per point, huge stakes even by today's standards. The event was to present bridge as a rich, exciting spectacle and to break through into television to bring the game within the reach of millions. The Circus ultimately won the match by 5,470 points, but Sharif still incurred a net loss after paying all related expenses.

In 1970–71, the Circus, under the management of Mike Ledeen, toured Canada and the US. Sharif's team joined with the Dallas Aces for a seven-city tour of Chicago, Winnipeg, Los Angeles, Minneapolis–St. Paul, Dallas, Detroit and Philadelphia. In each city, a team of local experts participated in the exhibition.

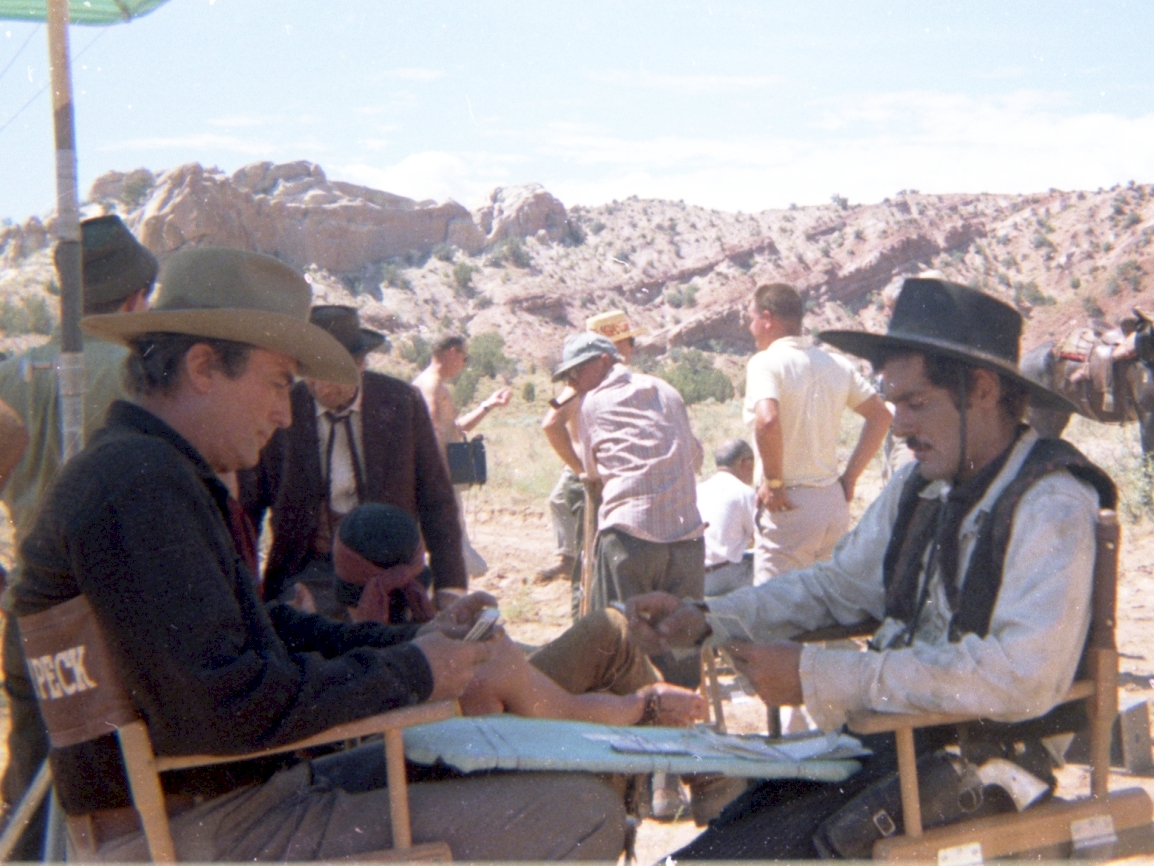
Gregory Peck and Omar Sharif playing bridge on the set of MacKenna's Gold, 1969.

In 1975, sponsored by the Lancia division of Fiat, Sharif and members of the Italian Blue Team faced off in four challenge matches against American teams. Sharif's team won in Chicago, but was defeated in New York, Los Angeles and Miami.

In 1990, the Omar Sharif World Individual Championship offered the largest total purse, $200,000, in the history of bridge.

In 1997, he was a member of the Committee of Honour for the Bermuda Bowl on the first time it was held in an Arab country, Tunisia. He competed in a transnational team, with French, German and Lebanese players, and finished 11th. In 1999, he played in a French senior team at the European Championships in Malta, finishing second. In 2000 at Maastricht, he joined Egypt's senior team, finishing in ninth place.

With Charles Goren and later Tannah Hirsch, Sharif contributed to a syndicated newspaper bridge column for the Chicago Tribune.

Sharif was the author and co-author of several books on bridge and licensed his name to a bridge video game, Omar Sharif Bridge, initially released in an MS-DOS version and Amiga version in 1992 and is still sold in Windows and mobile platform versions. He was the hand analyst commentator for the Epson worldwide bridge contests.

Sharif was a regular in casinos in France.

By 2000, Sharif had stopped playing bridge entirely. Having once proudly declared the game his passion, he now considered it an addiction: "I didn't want to be a slave to any passion anymore. I gave up card playing altogether, even bridge and gambling." Sharif continued to license his name to bridge software games, and co-authored a book with bridge writer David Bird, Omar Sharif Talks Bridge. Written in 2004, it includes some of his most famous deals and bridge stories.

== Personal life ==
=== Family and personal relationships ===
Sharif lived in Egypt from his birth until he moved to Europe in 1965. He recounted that in 1932, his father "wasn't a wealthy man", but "earned quite a bit of money". Before the Egyptian Revolution of 1952, King Farouk frequented Sharif's family home, and became a friend and card-game partner of Sharif's mother. His mother was an elegant and charming hostess who was all too delighted with the association because it gave her the privilege of "consorting only with the elite" of Egyptian society. Sharif recounted that his father's timber business was very successful during that time in ways that Sharif describes as dishonest or immoral. In contrast, after 1952, Sharif stated that wealth changed hands in Egypt under Nasser's nationalisation policies and his father's business "took a beating".

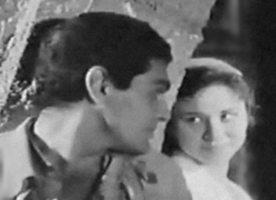
Faten Hamama and Sharif in a scene from the 1957 film Land of Peace

In 1954, Sharif starred in the film Struggle in the Valley with Faten Hamama, who shared a kiss with him, although she had previously refused to kiss on screen. The two fell in love; Sharif converted to Islam, changed his name, and married her. They had one son, Tarek Sharif, born in 1957 in Egypt, who appeared in Doctor Zhivago as Yuri at the age of eight. The couple separated in 1966. They divorced in 1974.

Sharif never remarried. He stated that after his divorce he never fell in love with another woman again. Before their divorce, Sharif dated actresses Pat Sheehan and Dodie Marshall.

The Nasser government imposed travel restrictions in the form of "exit visas", so Sharif's travel to take part in international films was sometimes impeded, something he found to be intolerable. These restrictions influenced Sharif's decision to remain in Europe between his film shoots, a decision that cost him his marriage, though the couple remained friends. It was a major crossroad in Sharif's life and changed him from an established family man to a committed bachelor living in European hotels.

When commenting about his fame and life in Hollywood, Sharif said, "It gave me glory, but it gave me loneliness also. And a lot of missing my own land, my own people and my own country". When Sharif's affair with actress and singer Barbra Streisand was made public in the Egyptian press, his Egyptian citizenship was almost withdrawn by the Egyptian government, because of Streisand being Jewish and a vocal supporter of Israel, which was then in a state of war with Egypt.

Sharif became friends with Peter O'Toole during the making of Lawrence of Arabia. They appeared in several other films together and remained close friends. He was also good friends with Egyptologist Zahi Hawass. Actor and friend Tom Courtenay revealed in an interview for 19 July 2008 edition of BBC Radio's Test Match Special that Sharif supported Hull City Association Football Club and in the 1970s he would telephone their automated scoreline from his home in Paris for score updates. Sharif was given an honorary degree by the University of Hull in 2010 and he used the occasion to meet Hull City football player Ken Wagstaff.

Sharif had an interest in horse racing spanning more than 50 years. He was often seen at French racecourses, with Deauville-La Touques Racecourse being his favourite. Sharif's horses won a number of important races and he had his best successes with Don Bosco, who won the Prix Gontaut-Biron, Prix Perth and Prix du Muguet. He also wrote for a French horse racing magazine.

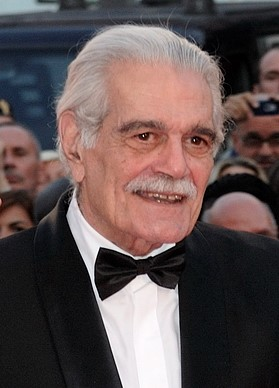
Sharif in 2009

In later life, Sharif lived mostly in Cairo. In addition to his son Tarek Sharif, he had two grandsons, Omar Sharif, Jr., (born 1983 in Montreal) and Karim. Omar Sharif Jr. is an actor.

Sharif was also one of the ambassadors of Egypt's bid for the 2010 FIFA World Cup which lost out to South Africa.

=== Views on religion ===
In a 2004 interview with ABC Australia, when asked about his beliefs, Sharif said "I believe in everything and nothing, I don't disbelieve in anything, everything is possible, as far as my brain tells me, I don't believe, because I believe that God is Justice. The first thing I learned in Catholicism is that God is Justice, and I can't see justice in the world". He also emphasized the power of belief after seeing his mother on her deathbed calling Mary and Christ, and how after wondering who he would call upon on his deathbed, he decided that he would call upon his mother.

In a later interview with Daily News Egypt in 2010, commenting on religious issues, he said, "Because when one sees what happens in the world between the religions, the different religions killing each other and murdering each other, it's disgusting as far as I'm concerned, it's ridiculous. And so I thought I might be useful. I believe in God and I believe in religion, but religion should belong to you. The extraordinary thing is that the Jews believe that only the Jews can go to paradise, the Christians believe only the Christians can go to paradise and the Muslims believe only the Muslims can go to paradise. Now why should God in his great Justice make somebody born that cannot go to paradise? Why? It's absurd."

Following his death, Sharif received an Islamic funeral as he was registered as a Muslim in Egypt. The funeral was attended by his son Tarek, and he was buried in the historic Sayeda Nafisa cemetery.

=== Position on the 2011 Egyptian revolution ===
Sharif was very supportive of the 2011 Egyptian revolution in his home country and called for the resignation of Hosni Mubarak, stating: "Given that the entire Egyptian people don't want him and he's been in power for 30 years, that's enough."

=== Health problems and death ===
Sharif had a triple heart bypass operation in 1992 and suffered a mild heart attack in 1994. Until his bypass, Sharif smoked 100 cigarettes a day. He quit smoking after the surgery.

In May 2015, it was reported that Sharif was suffering from Alzheimer's disease. His son Tarek Sharif (who portrayed his father's character as a child in Doctor Zhivago) said that his father was becoming confused when remembering some of the biggest films of his career; he would mix up the names of his best-known films, Doctor Zhivago and Lawrence of Arabia, often forgetting where they were filmed.

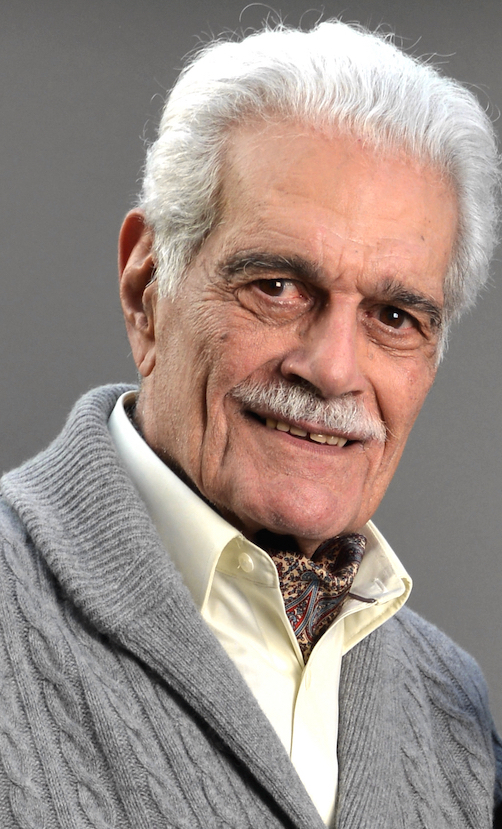
Sharif in April 2015, three months prior to his death

On 10 July 2015, less than six months after his former wife's death at the same age, Sharif died after suffering a heart attack at a hospital in Cairo.

On 12 July 2015, Sharif's funeral was held at the Grand Mosque of Mushir Tantawi in New Cairo. The funeral was attended by a group of Sharif's relatives, friends and Egyptian actors, his coffin was draped in the Egyptian flag and a black shroud. His coffin was later taken to the El-Sayeda Nafisa cemetery in southern Cairo, where he was buried.

== Awards ==
At the 35th Academy Awards, Sharif was nominated for Best Supporting Actor for his role as Sherif Ali in Lawrence of Arabia but lost to Ed Begley. He won two Golden Globe awards in the same year for his role. In 1966, he won a third Golden Globe award for the titular role in the film Doctor Zhivago. In November 2005, Sharif was awarded the inaugural Sergei Eisenstein Medal by the United Nations Educational, Scientific and Cultural Organization (UNESCO) in recognition of his significant contributions to world film and cultural diversity. The medal, which is awarded very infrequently, is named after Russian director Sergei Eisenstein. Only 25 have been struck, as determined by the agreement between UNESCO, Russia's Mosfilm and the Vivat Foundation. In 2006, Sharif was appointed the honorary president of the Cairo International Film Festival.

== Honours ==
- Egypt: Grand Cross of the Order of Merit
- France: Knight of the Legion of Honour
- Morocco: Commander of the Order of Ouissam Alaouite

== Filmography ==
Film
Year	Title	Role	Notes
1954	Devil of the Sahara	Essam	Also known as Shaytan al-Sahara
1954	The Blazing Sun	Ahmed	Also known as Struggle in the Valley and Sira' Fi al-Wadi
1955	Our Beautiful Days	Ahmed	Also known as Ayyamna al-Holwa
1956	La Châtelaine du Liban	Mokrir	Also known as The Lebanese Mission; credited as Omar Cherif
1956	Struggle in the Pier	Ragab	Also known as A Fight Within the Port, Sira' Fi al-Mina
1957	Sleepless	Aziz	Also known as La Anam and No Tomorrow
1957	Land of Peace	Ahmed	Also known as Ard al-Salam
1958	Goha	Goha	Credited as Omar Cherif
1958	Beach of Secrets	Mamdoh	Also known as Shatie el asrar
1958	My Lover's Fault	Salah	Also known as Ghaltet habibi
1959	Struggle on the Nile	Muhassab	Also known as Siraa fil Nil
1959	Lady of the Palace	Adel	Also known as Sayyidat al-Qasr
1959	For a Woman	Shokri	Also known as Min ajal emraa For a Woman
1959	Appointment with the Unknown	Madgi	Also known as An Maweed maa maghoul
1959	Scandel in Zamalek	Ahmed	Also known as Fadiha fil Zamalek
1960	We Are the Students	Adel	Also known as Ehna el talamiza
1960	Love Sickness	Hasan	Also known as Lawet el hub
1961	Gharam el assiad	Essam Murad	Also known as Masters Love
1961	The Beginning and the End	Hassanien	Also known as Bidaya wa Nihaya
1961	A Rumor of Love	Hussein	Also known as Esha'a hob
1961	The River of Love	Khalid	Also known as Nahr al-Hob
1961	My Only Love	Captain Adel	Also known as Hobi al-Wahid
1961	There is a Man in our House	Ibrahim	Also known as Fi Baytouna Ragoul
1962	Lawrence of Arabia	Sherif Ali ibn el Kharish	Golden Globe Award for Best Supporting Actor – Motion Picture; Golden Globe Award for New Star of the Year – Actor; Nominated – Academy Award for Best Supporting Actor
1964	The Fall of the Roman Empire	Sohamus	
1964	Behold a Pale Horse	Francisco	
1964	The Yellow Rolls-Royce	Davich	
1965	Genghis Khan	Genghis Khan	
1965	Marco the Magnificent	Sheik Alla Hou, 'The Desert Wind'	
1965	Doctor Zhivago	Dr. Yuri Andreyevich Zhivago	Golden Globe Award for Best Actor – Motion Picture Drama
1965	The Mamelukes	Ahmed	Participated in Thessaloniki International Film Festival
1967	The Night of the Generals	Major Grau	
1967	More Than a Miracle	Prince Rodrigo Fernandez	
1968	Funny Girl	Nicky Arnstein	
1968	Mayerling	Archduke Rudolf	
1969	Mackenna's Gold	John Colorado	
1969	The Appointment	Frenderico Fendi	
1969	Che!	Che Guevara	
1969	Trois hommes sur un cheval	Un turfiste	Uncredited
1971	The Last Valley	Vogel	
1971	The Horsemen	Uraz	
1971	The Burglars	Abel Zacharia	Simultaneously shot in French as Le Casse with the same cast
1972	Le Droit d'aimer	Pierre	
1973	The Mysterious Island	Captain Nemo	
1974	The Tamarind Seed	Feodor Sverdlov	
1974	Juggernaut	Captain Alex Brunel	
1975	Funny Lady	Nicky Arnstein	
1976	Ace Up My Sleeve	Andre Ferren	Also known as Crime and Passion
1976	The Pink Panther Strikes Again	Egyptian Assassin	Cameo; uncredited
1979	Ashanti: Land of No Mercy	Prince Hassan	
1979	Bloodline	Ivo Palazzi	
1980	S*H*E	Baron Cesare Magnasco	Also known as S*H*E: Security Hazards Expert
1980	The Baltimore Bullet	The Deacon	
1980	Oh! Heavenly Dog	Malcolm Bart	
1981	Green Ice	Meno Argenti	
1981	Inchon	Indian officer	Cameo; uncredited
1984	Top Secret!	Agent Cedric	
1987	Grand Larceny	Rashid Saud	
1988	The Possessed	Stepan	Also known as Les Possédés
1988	Les Pyramides bleues	Alex	Also known as The Novice
1988	Keys to Freedom	Jonathan	
1989	The Puppeteer	Mohamed Gad El Kareem	Also known as El Aragoz
1990	Mountains of the Moon	Sultan	Uncredited
1990	Viaggio d'amore	Rico	
1990	The Rainbow Thief	Dima	
1991	War in the Land of Egypt	Mayor Abdel Razek El-Shershaby	Also known as El Mowaten Masri and An Egyptian Citizen
1991	Mayrig	Hagop	
1992	588 rue paradis	Hagop	Also known as Mother
1992	Beyond Justice	Emir Beni-Zair	
1992	Tengoku no Taizai	Tsai Mang Hua	
1993	Laughter, Games, Seriousness and Love	Adham's father	Also known as Dehk we le'b we gad we hob
1996	Lebanon... Imprisoned Splendour	Himself	Documentary
1997	Heaven Before I Die	Kahlil Gibran	
1998	Mysteries of Egypt	Grandfather	Documentary
1999	The 13th Warrior	Melchisideck	
2001	Censor		
2001	The Parole Officer	Victor	
2003	Monsieur Ibrahim	Monsieur Ibrahim	César Award for Best Actor
2004	Hidalgo	Sheikh Riyadh	
2005	The Chronicles of Narnia: The Lion, the Witch and the Wardrobe (Italian version)	Aslan (voice)	Italian dub
2006	Fuoco su di me	Principe Nicola	
2006	One Night with the King	Prince Memucan	
2006	The Crown Prince	Hans Canon	
2008	10,000 BC	Narrator	Voice
2008	Hassan and Marcus	Hassan / Morcus	Also known as Hassan wa Morcus
2009	The Traveller	Older Hassan	Commonly known as Al Mosafer
2009	J'ai oublié de te dire	Jaume	Also known as I Forgot to Tell You
2013	A Castle in Italy	Himself	
2013	Rock the Casbah	Moulay Hassan	
2015	1001 Inventions and the World of Ibn Al-Haytham	Grandfather	Film lead role (final film role)

Television
Year	Title	Role	Notes
1966	The Poppy Is Also a Flower	Dr. Rad	TV movie
1973	The Mysterious Island	Captain Nemo	TV miniseries; also known as L'Ile Mysterieuse
1980	Pleasure Palace	Louis Lefevre	TV movie
1983	Ayoub	Abdelhamid El-Sokkary	TV movie
1984	The Far Pavilions	Koda Dad	TV miniseries, based on The Far Pavilions
1985	Vicious Circle	Joseph Garcin	TV play
1985	Edge of the Wind	McCorquodale	TV play by Don Webb, with John Mills and Lucy Gutteridge
1986	Peter the Great	Prince Feodor Romodanovsky	TV miniseries
1986	Harem	Sultan Hassan	TV miniseries
1986	Anastasia: The Mystery of Anna	Czar Nicholas II	TV miniseries
1991	Memories of Midnight	Constantin Demiris	TV movie
1992	Mrs. 'Arris Goes to Paris	Marquis Hippolite	TV movie
1995	Catherine the Great	Razumovsky	TV movie
1996	Gulliver's Travels	The Sorcerer	TV miniseries
1999	Cleopatra's Palace: In Search of a Legend	Narrator	Documentary
2001	Shaka Zulu: The Citadel	The King	TV movie
2002	Building the Great Pyramid	Narrator	Documentary
2005	Imperium: Saint Peter	Saint Peter	TV movie
2006	The Ten Commandments	Jethro	TV miniseries
2007	Hanan W Haneen	Raouf	Egyptian TV series, also known as Tenderness and Nostalgia
2008	The Last Templar	Konstantine	TV series

== Books ==
- Bridge Deluxe II: Play with Omar Sharif (instruction manual, 1966) — Contract bridge
- The Eternal Male (1977; originally published in French as L’Éternel masculin, Paris: Stock, 1976; with Marie-Thérèse Guinchard; translated by Martin Sokolinsky) — Autobiography
- Goren’s Bridge Complete (with Charles Goren; New York: Doubleday, 1980) — Contract bridge
- Omar Sharif’s Life in Bridge (with Anne Segalen and Patrick Sussel; London: Faber, 1983; originally published in French as Ma vie au bridge, Paris: Fayard, 1982; translated and adapted by Terence Reese) — Contract bridge
- Omar Sharif Talks Bridge (2004) — Contract bridge

== See also ==
- Cinema of the United States
- Cinema of Egypt
- David Lean
- Terence Young
- Ezz El-Dine Zulficar
- Salah Abu Seif
