= Bombshell (slang) =

Forerunner to the term "sex symbol"

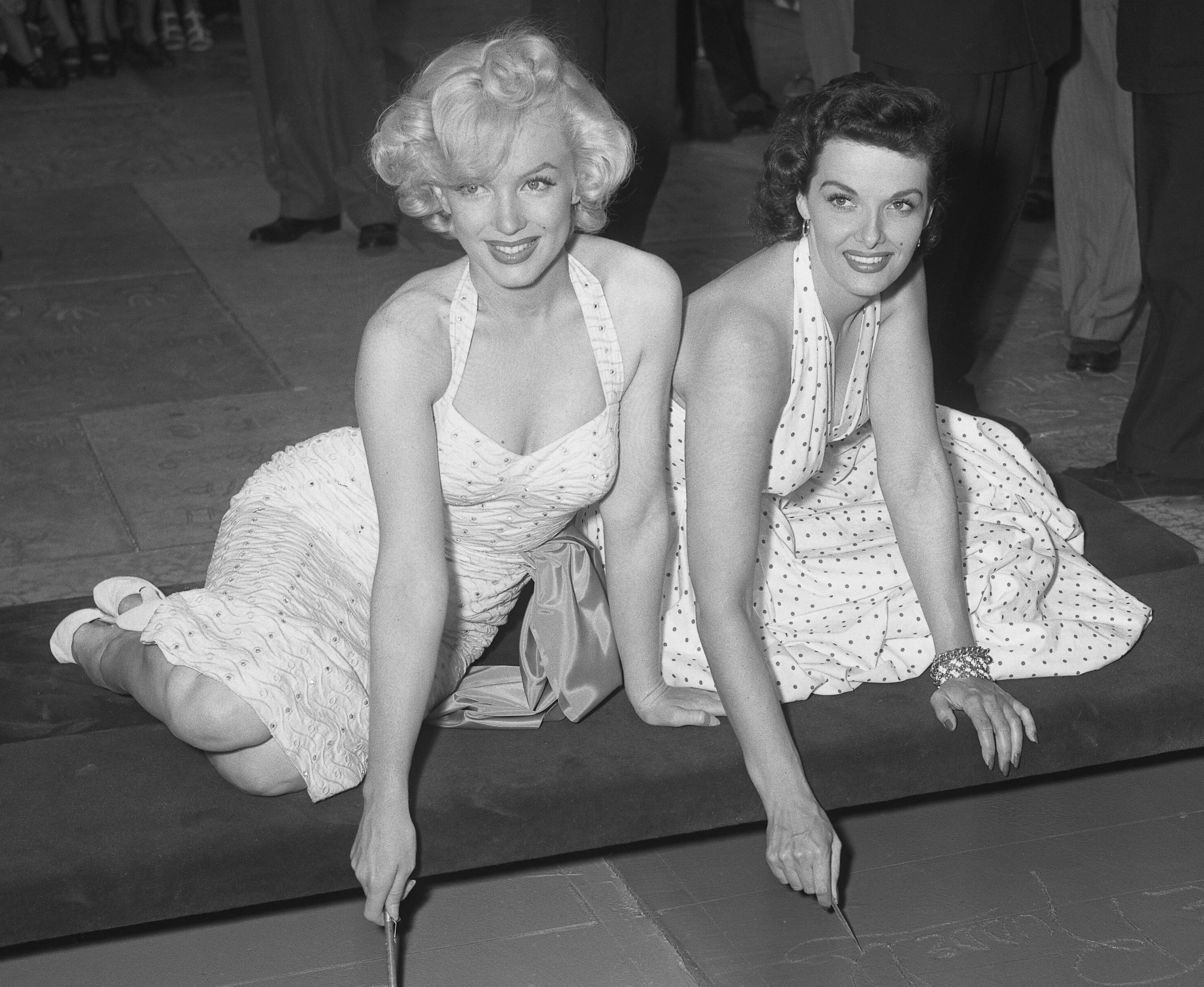
Marilyn Monroe and Jane Russell

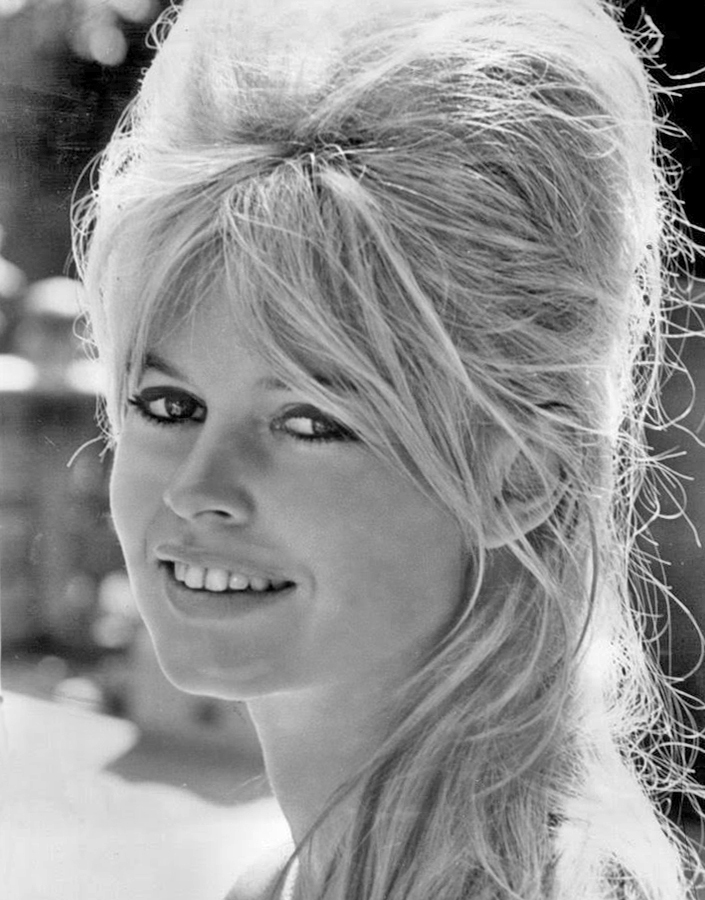
Brigitte Bardot in 1962

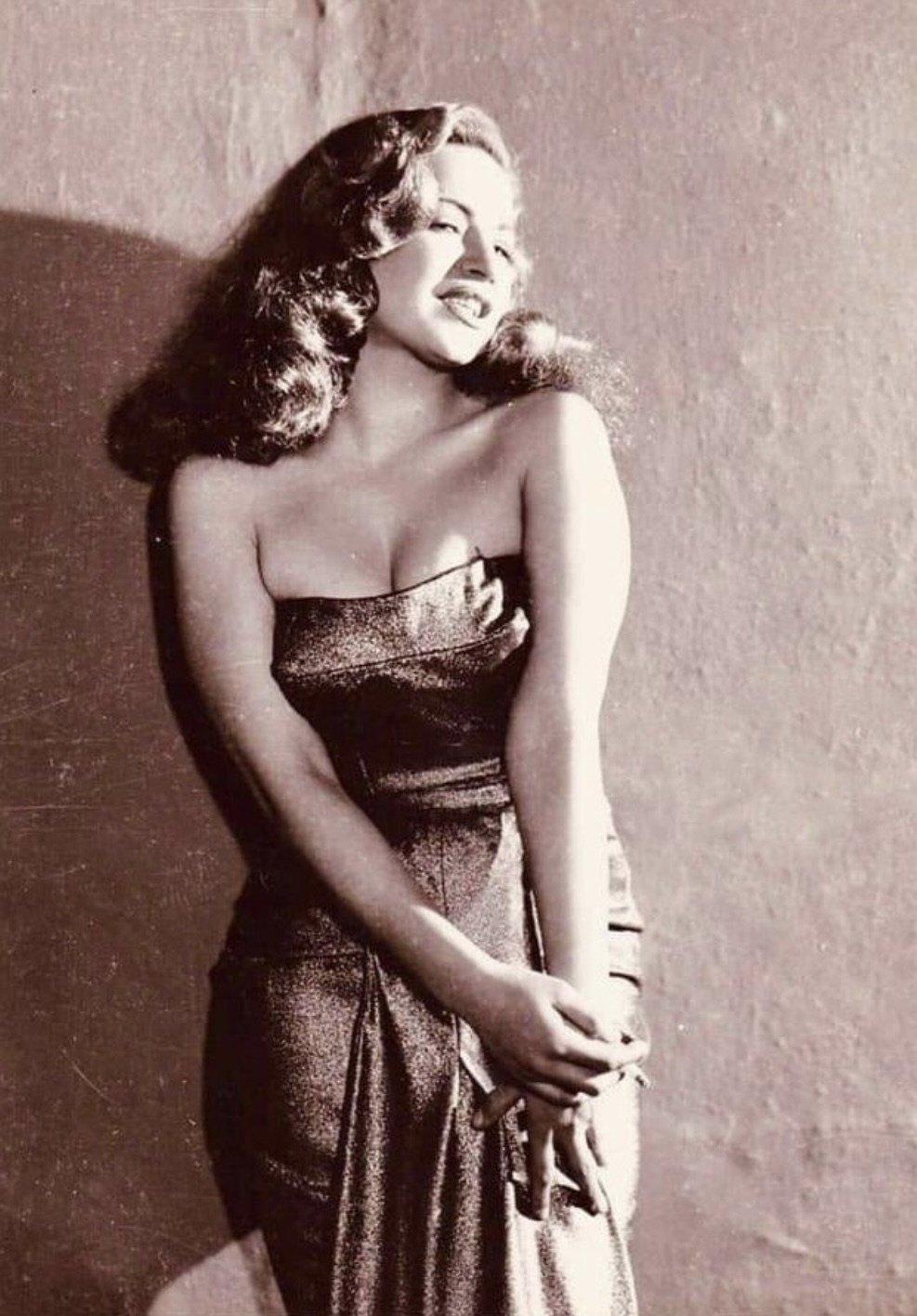
Hind Rostom

The term bombshell is a forerunner to the term "sex symbol" used to describe popular women regarded as very attractive. The Online Etymology Dictionary by Douglas Harper attests the usage of the term in this meaning since 1942. Bombshell has a longer history in its other, more general figurative meaning of a "shattering or devastating thing or event" since 1860.

== History ==
The first woman to be known as a bombshell was Jean Harlow, who was nicknamed the "blonde bombshell" for her film Platinum Blonde (1931). Two years later, she starred in the Metro-Goldwyn-Mayer film Bombshell (1933). One of the blurbs on posters was "Lovely, luscious, exotic Jean Harlow as the Blonde Bombshell of filmdom." Hollywood soon took up the blonde bombshell, and then, during the late 1940s through the early 1960s, brunette, exotic, and ethnic versions (e.g., Jane Russell, Dorothy Dandridge and Sophia Loren) were also cultivated as complements to, or as satellites of, the blonde bombshell. Some of the movie stars, largely of the 1940s–1960s, referred to as bombshells include Marilyn Monroe, Rita Hayworth, Diana Dors, Jayne Mansfield, Mamie Van Doren, Jane Russell, Ava Gardner, Camelia, Carroll Baker, Brigitte Bardot, Kim Novak, Julie Christie, Sophia Loren, Elizabeth Taylor, Ann-Margret, Hind Rostom, Veronica Lake, Raquel Welch, Ursula Andress, Marlene Dietrich, Betty Grable, Marie Wilson, Judy Holliday, Lana Turner, Dorothy Dandridge, Barbara Eden, Carol Wayne, Goldie Hawn, Claudia Cardinale, Anita Ekberg and Gina Lollobrigida.

The epithet rose sharply in popularity after the death of Marilyn Monroe in 1962, and declined in popularity in the late 1960s due to emerging ideological conflicts.

== Stereotype ==
Bombshells are identified with hypersexuality, their curves, including hourglass figures and large breasts, sex appeal, larger than life personas or hedonistic lifestyle, as well as stereotypes associated with blonde women and supermodels.

== See also ==
- Pin-up model
- Sexual attraction
