= 1001 Inventions and the World of Ibn Al-Haytham =

- Directed by: Ahmed Salim
- Screenplay by: Ahmed Salim
- Produced by: Ahmed Salim; David Pope
- Starring: Omar Sharif; Khalid Abdalla
- Cinematography: Gavin Finney
- Music by: Sami Yusuf
- Production company: 1001 Inventions
- Release date: 13 December 2015 (Dubai International Film Festival)
- Country: United Kingdom
- Language: English

1001 Inventions and the World of Ibn Al-Haytham is a 2015 part-animated film directed by Ahmed Salim and starring Omar Sharif. It is Sharif's final film.

The film was produced by 1001 Inventions, a British foundation aiming to promote the achievements of the Golden Age of Islam. Both the film and the exhibition were created to coincide with the United Nations campaign celebrating the International Year of Light, operated by UNESCO.

Within the film, Sharif's character helps his granddaughter with a challenging homework assignment about Ibn Al-Haytham, the eleventh century scholar who made significant contributions to the principles of optics and visual perception.

== See also ==
- List of Islamic films
- List of animated Islamic films
- Ahmed Salim
