= Mysteries of Egypt =

- Theatrical release poster
- Directed by: Bruce Neibaur
- Written by: Bruce Neibaur; John Pielmeier
- Starring: Omar Sharif
- Distributed by: Destination Cinema
- Release date: June 2, 1998
- Running time: 38 minutes
- Countries: United States; Canada
- Language: English
- Box office: $40 million (US/Canada) $70.8 million (Worldwide)

Mysteries of Egypt is an IMAX film about Howard Carter's discovery of King Tutankhamen's tomb in 1922. Directed by Bruce Neibaur, the film was released June 2, 1998.

== Cast ==
- Omar Sharif - Grandfather
- Kate Maberly - Granddaughter
- Timothy Davies - Howard Carter
- Julian Curry - Carnarvon

== Release ==
The film was released June 2, 1998 and grossed $40,593,486 from 27 theatres in the United States and Canada. It was the highest-grossing limited release of 1999 with $25 million earned in the year.

== See also ==
- List of highest-grossing documentary films
