= Lebanon... Imprisoned Splendour =

1996 documentary film

Lebanon... Imprisoned Splendour (Film)
- Directed by: Daizy Gedeon
- Written by: Daizy Gedeon
- Produced by: Daizy Gedeon
- Starring: Daizy Gedeon; Omar Sharif
- Release date: 1996
- Running time: 61 minutes
- Country: Lebanon
- Language: Lebanese Arabic

Lebanon... Imprisoned Splendour; is a documentary film written and produced by Daizy Gedeon, covering Lebanon and its history. In the film, several political figures were interviewed by Gedeon, including Jean Obeid, Samir Geagea, Amine Gemayel and Walid Jumblatt. The film also stars Egyptian-Lebanese actor Omar Sharif.

Lebanon... Imprisoned Splendour won several awards including the 1996 Silver Screen Award at the US International Film & Video Festival.

== Cast ==
- Daizy Gedeon
- Omar Sharif

== Awards ==
Award/Festival	Category	Winner/Nominee	Won
US International Film & Video Festival	Silver Screen	Daizy Gedeon	Won
Kahlil Gibran	Literary Award	Daizy Gedeon	Won
Human Rights & Equal Opportunity Commission	High Commendation	Daizy Gedeon	Won
Boston Film Festival	Best of the Shorts	Daizy Gedeon	Won
Museum of Sydney	"Our eternal search for a homeland"	Daizy Gedeon	
