= Struggle on the Nile =

- Directed by: Atef Salem
- Written by: Ali El Zorkani
- Release date: 1959
- Country: Egypt
- Language: Arabic

Struggle on the Nile (Arabic: صراع في النيل, romanized: Sira‘ Fi Al Nil; French: Tempête sur le Nil) is a 1959 Egyptian action and drama film directed by Atef Salem and written by Ali El Zorkani. It stars three of Egypt's most famous artists, Omar Sharif, Hend Rostom, and Rushdy Abaza.

This film was selected as one of The Top 100 films of the centenary of Egyptian cinema.

== Plot ==
Omar Sharif plays Muhassab, son of the headman Rais Gad, who goes with Mayor Migahed (Rushdy Abaza) to buy an expensive scow in Luxor, but the thieves become aware of this purchase and decide to steal the money.

== Main cast ==
- Hend Rostom as Nargis
- Omar Sharif as Muhassab
- Rushdy Abaza as Mayor Migahed
- Hassan Elbaroudi as Rais Gad (the headman)
- Kamel Anwar as The thief
- Hassan Eldowini as Moled (the thief)
