= Hind Rostom =

Egyptian actress (1929–2011)

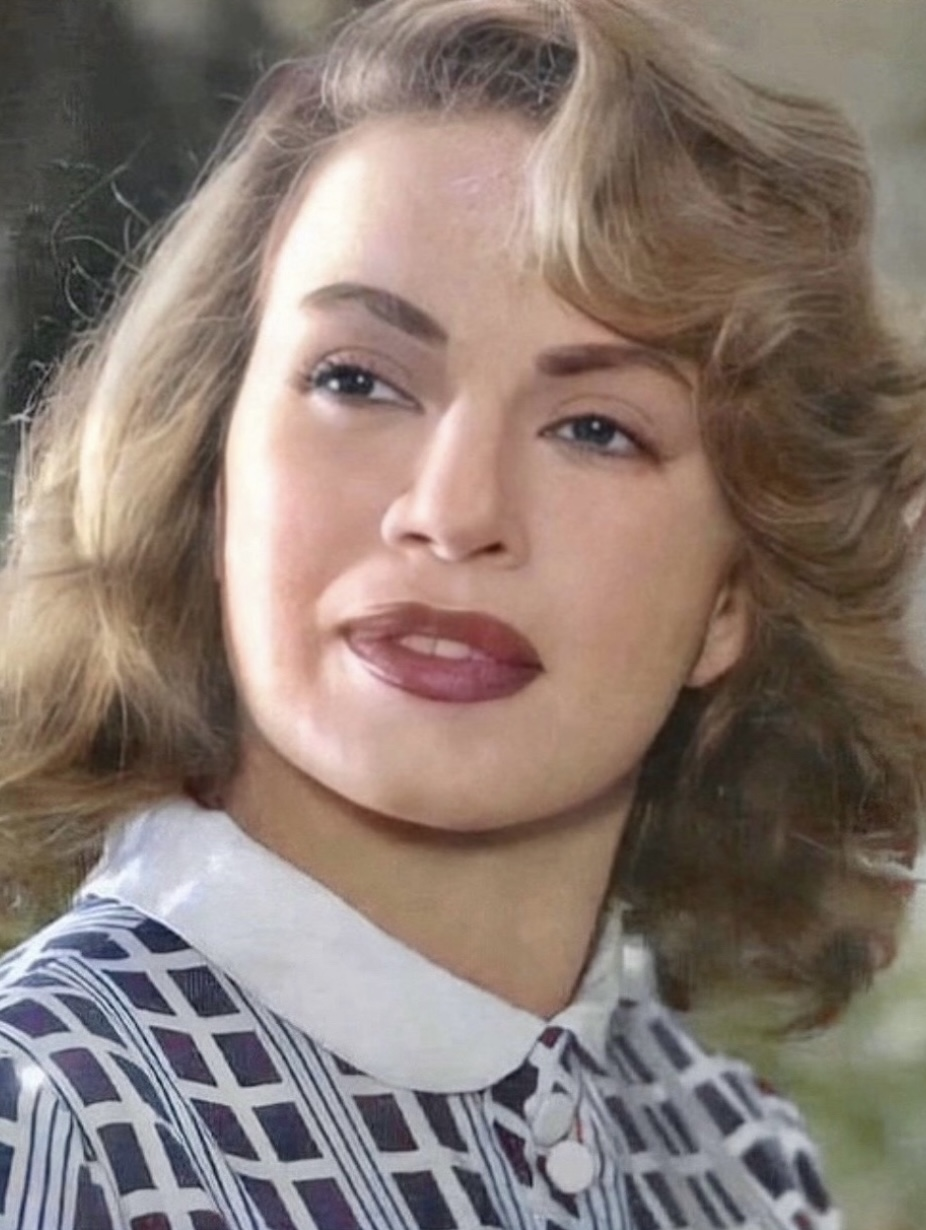
- Rostom in 1959
- Born: Nariman Hussein Mohammed Murad; 12 November 1929; Alexandria, Egypt
- Died: 8 August 2011 (aged 81); Cairo, Egypt
- Other name: Marilyn Monroe of Egypt
- Occupation: Actress
- Spouses: Hassan Reda; Dr. Mohammad Fayad
- Children: Bassant Reda (daughter)

Hind Hussain Mohammed or Nariman Hussein Murad, more commonly known by her stage name Hind Rostom, (Arabic: هند رستم pronounced [ˈhende ˈɾostom]; 12 November 1929 – 8 August 2011) was an Egyptian actress and is considered one of the icons in the Egyptian cinema, as she was mainly known for her sensual roles. Her physical appearance earned her the name Marilyn Monroe of the east (مارلين مونرو الشرق). Hind Rostom starred in more than 80 movies in her career.

== Early life ==
Hind Hussain Mohammed was born in the neighborhood of Moharram Bek, Alexandria, Egypt on November 12, 1929. She was born to a Middle class family, to an Egyptian mother and an Alexandrian father of Egyptian origin.

== Career ==
She started her career at the age of 16 with the film Azhaar wa Ashwak (Flowers and Thorns). Her first true success was in 1955 when the famous director Hassan El Imam offered her a role in Banat el Lail (Women of the Night).

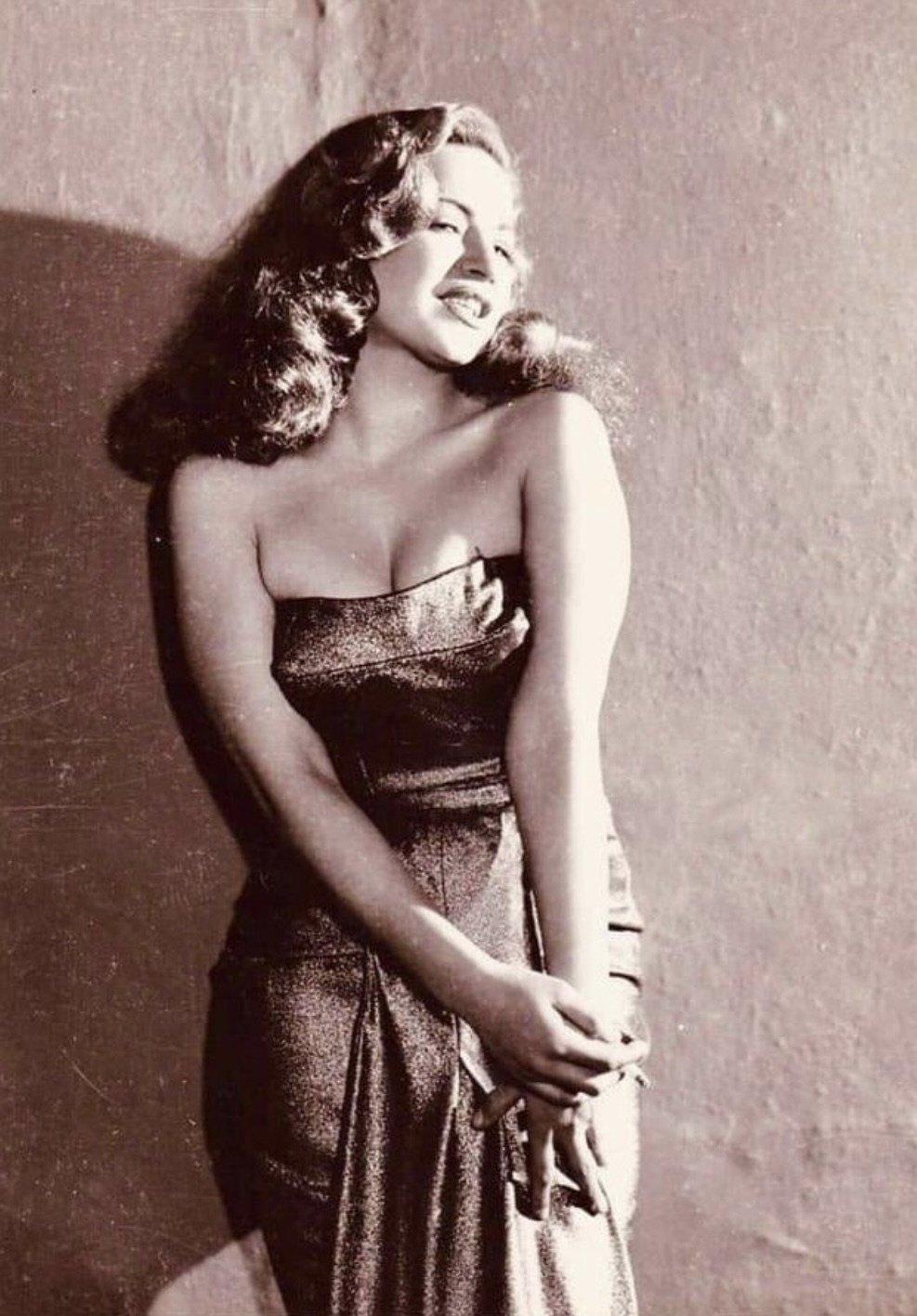
Rostom in the early 1950s

Her famous films include Ezz El-Dine Zulficar's Return My Heart (Rodda Qalbi) with Shoukry Sarhan, Mariam Fakhr Eddine and Salah Zulfikar in 1957, Ibn Hamidu with Ismail Yassine in 1957. She was cast by Youssef Chahine in the 1958 film Cairo Station (The Iron Gate / Bab El Hadid) alongside Farid Shawki. She also co-starred in Salah Abu Seif's La Anam (Sleepless) with Faten Hamama, Omar Sharif, and Rushdy Abaza in 1958, Sira' fi al-Nil (Struggle on the Nile) with Omar Sharif and Rushdy Abaza in 1959, and Chafika el Koptia (Chafika the Coptic Girl) in 1963, where she played the role of a Coptic Orthodox nun. Rostom was known as the queen of seduction in Egyptian cinema, the "Marilyn Monroe of the East (or of the Egyptian cinema)".

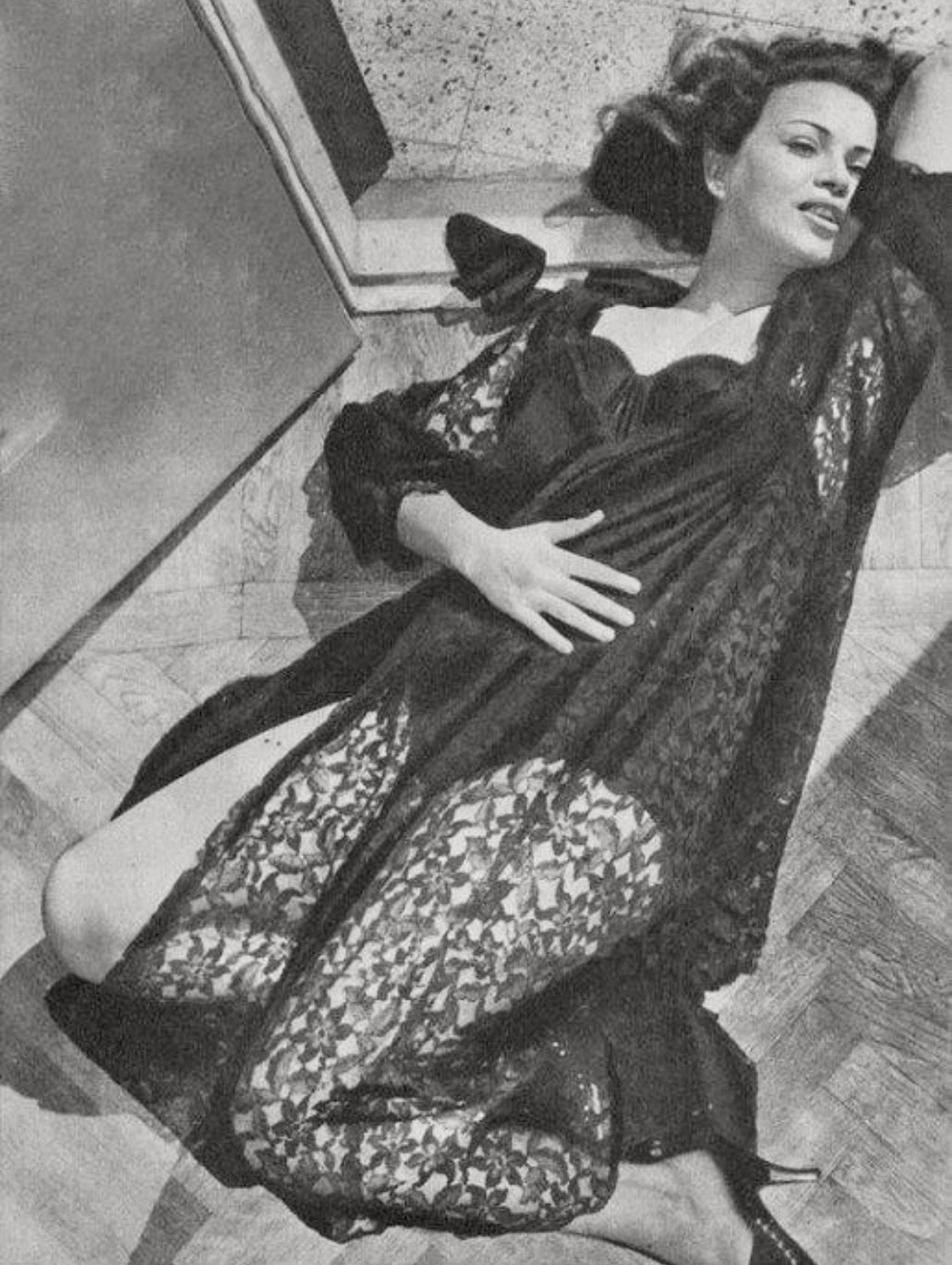
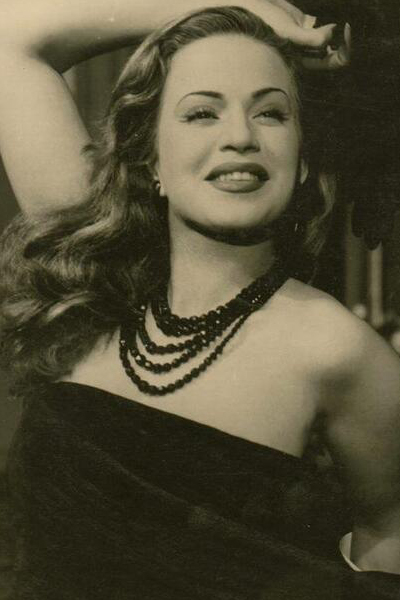
Publicity photos of Hind Rostom in the 1960s

She decided to retire acting in 1979 because she wanted the audience to remember her at her best. In December 2002 Rostom once more turned down an offer of £E1,000,000 for her biography. The offer was made by an Egyptian satellite channel to portray her life as a drama series. She was asked to submit a complete history of her past achievements, and work experiences with prominent actors of the past, such as Farid Shawki, Salah Zulfikar, Shukri Sarhan, and Shadia. The actress stated that she refused to sell her life as a means of entertainment and felt that her personal life was of her concern and no one else. Rostom made a statement when she turned down belly dancer Fifi Abdo's invitation to attend a party held in Hind Rostom's honour.

In 2004, she refused to accept Order of Sciences and Arts, "The award came too late, I'm not placed on the shelf for them to pick me whenever they want, there's only one Hind Rostom in the middle east, and let's consider that the number of my generation star actresses isn't that big enough to ignore us, and also it's not appropriate to honor me after years of honoring people who are less than me, another point is that I also refuse to honor me before Shadia, she'd deserved it and she was a star longtime before me", Rostom commented.

== Personal life ==
Hind Rostom's personal life has always been shrouded in mystery. She was married twice, once to Hassan Reda, a film director and father of her only daughter, Passant, then to Dr. Mohammad Fayaad, a gynecologist. "I have no regrets," she stated in an interview about her decision to retire. "I did it for the love of my life, my prince, Dr. Fayaad," she added, referring to her second husband Mohammed Fayyad, whom she was married to for more than 50 years.

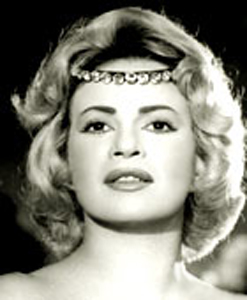
Hind Rostom in 1960

Rostom was overprotective of her daughter Passant due to worry about the stigma associated with artists’ children lacking parental supervision. "She was extremely stern, even with my friends," Passant recalled. She was not allowed to join her friends on trips and outings.

== Death ==
On August 8, 2011, Rostom died in a hospital in Al-Mohandeseen, Giza due to a heart attack, at the age of 81.

== Honours ==
On November 12, 2018, Google recognized her with a doodle.

== Selected filmography ==
=== Film ===
Year	Film	Role	Notes
1950	Baba Amin	Sonia	
1954	Women Can’t Lie		
1955	Flesh	Nurten	
1955	A Love Crime		
1955	Women of the Night		
1956	My One and Only Love		
1957	Return My Heart	Karima	
1957	Hamido's son	Aziza	
1958	Cairo Station	Hanuma	
1958	Sleepless	Kawthar	
1958	Ismail Yassine in the Mental Hospital		
1959	Struggle in the Nile	Dancer Nargis	
1959	She Lived for Love		
1960	Between Heaven and Earth	Star Nahid Shoukri	
1961	A Rumor of Love		
1961	Path of Heroes	Nour	
1963	Chafika the Copt Girl	Chafika Elqebteya	
1965	The Nun		
1966	Three Thieves	Amina	
1967	Departure from Heaven	Anan	
1967	The Second Groom	Wafae	
1971	My Beautiful teacher	Nadia	
1972	Den of Villains		
1979	My Life is Agony	Fatma	
