= Daizy Gedeon =

Australian-Lebanese journalist and filmmaker

- Born: 1965 (age 60–61); Kousba, Lebanon
- Occupations: Journalist and filmmaker

Daizy Gedeon (born 1965, Kousba, Lebanon) is a Lebanese Australian journalist and filmmaker.

== Early life ==
Gedeon was born in Kousba, Lebanon in 1965. Her family immigrated to Australia when she was five years old.

== Career ==
=== Jouranlism ===
Gedeon began her writing career as a sports writer in 1987 and was the first female sports journalist to work for the newspaper The Australian. and the first female football writer in Australia which led her to the 1988 Olympic Games in Seoul. After several years of covering sports, Daizy started to cover foreign affairs, particularly those in the Middle East. She interviewed Yasser Arafat at the 1990 Arab Summit in Baghdad and covered the Lebanon War as a correspondent for publications including The Times.

=== Filmmaking ===
In 1996, Gedeon released her first feature documentary film, Lebanon... Imprisoned Splendour, starring Omar Sharif. The documentary qualified for the 1998 Academy Awards for Best Feature Documentary and won several international accolades including the Silver Screen Award at the US International Film and Video Festival and the Best of the Shorts at the Boston Film Festival.

In 2021, Gedeon was presented with the Movie That Matters Award at a Better World Fund (BWF) gala event in Cannes for her documentary film Enough! Lebanon's Darkest Hour.

== Filmography ==
Film	Year	Roles	Notes
Lebanon... Imprisoned Splendour	1996	Director, writer, producer	Documentary
Enough! Lebanon's Darkest Hour	2021	Director, writer	Documentary

== See also ==
- Yuval Abraham – Israeli journalist, film director, and activist
- Jan Fran – Lebanese Australian independent journalist
- Antony Loewenstein – anti-Zionist Australian journalist and filmmaker
- Avi Yemini – Israeli-Australian presenter for the far-right Rebel News
- Attacks on journalists during the Israel–Hezbollah conflict (2023–present)
