= Between Heaven and Earth (1959 film) =

1959 film

- Directed by: Salah Abu Seif
- Written by: Naguib Mahfouz; El Sayed Bedir; Salah Abu Seif
- Produced by: Dollar Film
- Starring: Hend Rostom
- Cinematography: Wahid Farid
- Music by: Fouad El Zahery
- Release date: November 9, 1959
- Running time: 85 minutes
- Country: Egypt
- Language: Arabic

Between Heaven and Earth (Egyptian Arabic: بين السماء والأرض, translit. Bayn El Sama we El Ard) is an Egyptian comedy film directed by Salah Abu Seif and released on November 9, 1959.

== Synopsis ==
An elevator breaks down, leaving a group of miserable strangers inside, each with their own story and goals. They include a movie star (Hend Rostom), a lunatic (Abdel Moneim Ibrahim), and other miserable souls. When they begin to realize they have little chance of escaping alive, they learn to see life in a better light and their hopes rise with the near-death experience. Meanwhile, an equally unhappy person outside the elevator tries to commit suicide by jumping off the roof of the building, at least until help arrives and saves those who can save him.

== Cast ==
- Hend Rostom (Nahed Shoukry)
- Abdel Moneim Madbouly (thief)
- Mahmoud El-Meliguy (Kamil, a gang leader)
- Abdul Salam Al Nabulsy (passenger)
- Abdel Moneim Ibrahim (madman)
- Said Abu Bakr (harasser)
- Naima Wasfi (Umm Samir)
- Qadriya Qadri (unfaithful wife)
- Abdel Ghani Nagdi (Kadim Abdo)
- Amin Wahba (Said)
- Shafik Nour El Din (passenger)
- Yaqoub Mikhail (Abu Samir)
- Mahmoud Azmy (cheating lover)
- Thurayya Fakhry (Khadija's mother)
- Zizi Mustafa (Sonia)
- Samia Roshdi (Zakia, the young bride's mother)
- Mimi Sedky (young bride)
- Ali Rushdi (father of the young bridge)
- Hassan al-Dwaini (Slem, elevator operator)
- Ahmed Louxor (director)
- Nazim Shaarawy (civil defense commander)
- Mahmoud Mokhtar (architect)
- Kamel Anwar (registrar)
- Khaled al-Ajbani (janitor)
- Nahed Samir (Khadija)
- Sayed al-Qadi (Omar)
- Hussein Ismail (soldier)
- Abdelmonem Ismail (al-Tamarji)
- Mohsen Hassanein (Shawky)
- George Yordanis (Christo)
- Edmond Tuema (Khawaja's Greek guest)
- Ikram Ezzo (daughter of Sayed and Khadija)
- Ali Orabi (janitor)
- Juma Idris (janitor)
- Awatef Takla
- Mukhtar al-Sayed

== See also ==
- Cinema of Egypt
- Lists of Egyptian films
- List of Egyptian films of the 1950s
