= Enough! Lebanon's Darkest Hour =

2021 documentary film by Daizy Gedeon

Enough! Lebanon's Darkest Hour is a 2021 feature documentary film written and directed by Lebanese-Australian filmmaker Daizy Gedeon.

== Synopsis ==
Shot over four years and across four continents, the film documents Lebanon's descent into a state of turmoil over recent years. It covers the 2019 October Revolution and includes exclusive interviews with many key political leaders of the past four years, including prime minister Saad Hariri, former foreign minister Gebran Bassil, warlord Dr. Samir Geagea, Hezbollah minister Mohammad Fneich, former justice minister Salim Jreissati and governor of Lebanon's Central Bank, Riad Salame.

== Awards ==
The documentary won the Movie That Matters Award 2021 at a Better World Fund (BWF) gala in Cannes.

== Distribution ==
Exploration Films signed an agreement for the film in April 2022 and now manages exclusive distribution for the film in North America.
