= Hamido's Son =

1957 Egyptian comedy film

- Directed by: Fatin Abdel Wahab
- Screenplay by: Abbas Kamel
- Starring: Ismail Yassine; Hind Rostom
- Cinematography: Cello Cicivelli
- Edited by: Albert Najib
- Music by: Attia Sharara
- Distributed by: El Sharq
- Release date: 7 July 1957
- Running time: 110 minutes
- Country: Egypt
- Language: Arabic

Hamido's Son (Arabic: ابن حميدو, romanized: Ibn Hamido) is a 1957 Egyptian comedy film directed by Fatin Abdel Wahab.

== Plot Summary ==
Ibn Hamido is a classic Egyptian comedy set in a small coastal fishing town near Alexandria . The story follows Ibn Hamido (played by Ismail Yassin), his friend Hassan (Ahmed Ramzy). They both seem to be simple newcomers, but it is later revealed that they are actually undercover police officers investigating a smuggling ring operation.

== Cast ==
- Ismail Yassine as Hamido's son
- Hind Rostom as Aziza
- Ahmed Ramzy as Hassan
- Abd El Fatah El Quossary as Hanafi
- Zeinat Sedki as Hamida
- Tawfik El Deken as El Baz Afandi

== See also ==
- Cinema of Egypt
- Lists of Egyptian films
- List of Egyptian films of the 1950s
- List of Egyptian films of 1953
