= La Anam (novel) =

1956 novel by Ihsan Abdel Quddous

La Anam لا أنام
- Author: Ihsan Abdel Quddous
- Language: Arabic
- Genre: Drama
- Publisher: Dar al-Qalam
- Publication date: 1956
- Publication place: Egypt
- Media type: Print (paperback)
- Pages: 288

La Anam (Arabic: لا أنام, Sleepless) is a drama novel by the prominent Egyptian novelist Ihsan Abdel Quddous.

== Plot summary ==
The novel's main character, Nadia, is a spoiled young woman, whose parents are divorced. Their divorce has led to a strong relationship between Nadia and her father. Her father tries to move on with his life and meets a new woman, Safia, who he quickly falls in love with. Nadia, who feels the loss of her father's love, deliberately tries to ruin his relationship with Safia. Nadia is willing to control others lives and change them just to keep her life the way she wants it. She decides to set up her father with one of her friends, a seductive and promiscuous woman. Her father falls in love with the lady, who is actually having an affair. Meanwhile, Nadia is stuck with a man who is older than she is.

== Film adaptations ==
Like many of Abdel Quddous's novels, this novel has had film adaptations. The 1957 film La Anam, which starred several distinguished actors and actresses like Faten Hamama, Omar Sharif, Rushdy Abaza, and Yehia Chahine, is based on this novel. This film was selected one of the best 150 Egyptian film productions in 1996, during the Egyptian Cinema centennial.
