= A Love Crime =

- جريمة حب
- Directed by: Atef Salem
- Written by: Amin Yousseff Ghurab (story); Mahmoud Sobhy (screenplay and dialogue)
- Produced by: Abbas Helmy
- Starring: Mariam Fakhr Eddine; Emad Hamdy; Hind Rostom; Salah Mansour
- Cinematography: Mohamed Abdel Azim
- Edited by: Mohamed Abbas
- Production company: Al-Ittihad Films
- Distributed by: Al-Sharq Films
- Release date: January 1, 1955
- Running time: 102 minutes
- Country: Egypt
- Language: Arabic

A Love Crime (Arabic: جريمة حب, transliterated as Garymet Hob) an Egyptian film released on January 1, 1955. The film is directed by Atef Salem, features a screenplay by Mahmoud Sobhy based on the novel by Amin Yousseff Ghurab, and stars Mariam Fakhr Eddine, Emad Hamdy, Hind Rostom, and Salah Mansour. The protagonist, a lawyer named Jalal, loses an important case and believes his wife's negligence is the reason. He launches into an affair with his beautiful client, who is murdered, leaving the wife as a suspect.

== Cast ==
- Emad Hamdy (Jalal Rushdi, a lawyer)
- Mariam Fakhr Eddine (Soraya Abdelwahed, Jalal's wife)
- Hind Rostom (Laila, Jalal's mistress)
- Salah Mansour (Hassanein, Laila's ex-husband)
- Abdel Aziz Ahmed (Ezzat Effendi, Jalal's assistant)
- Ahmad Shawqi (Ahmed Abdelmaqsoud, bribery suspect)
- Abdel Halim Alqalaawy (Haj Abdelmaqsoud, Ahmed's father)
- Fathia Shaheen (Souad Hanem, Ahmed's wife)
- “Wazza” (Nawal, Ahmed's young daughter)
- Mohamed Ahmed Al-Masry (Shalabi, bartender at the Spiro)
- Hussein Kandil (Hamdi, Jalal's friend)
- Soraya Fakhri (Jalal's maid)
- Hussein Ismail (cleaner at the Spiro)
- Laila Hamdy (Rose, Laila's neighbor)
- Zaki Ibrahim (Said Abdelwahed, Soraya's father)
- Ahmed Louxor (prosecutor of Laila's murder)
- Adly Kasseb (judge of Laila's murder)
- Ibrahim Heshmat (conservative juror of Laila's murder)
- Abdel Mona'em Saoudi (liberal juror of Laila's murder)
- Abdel Azim Kamel (Salah, defense lawyer for Soraya in Laila's murder)
- Abdelmonem Ismail (court litigator)
- Ali Al Ghandour (bribery prosecutor)
- Hassan El Baroudi (Omar Shehata Abdelsamad, Laila's yacht boatswain and buoy guard)
- Mahmoud Shokoko (Aragouzsho the puppet)

== Synopsis ==
The lawyer Jalal Rushdi (Emad Hamdy promises Souad Hanem (Fathia Shaheen), the wife of Ahmed Abdelmaqsoud (Ahmad Shawqi), a swift acquittal of her husband accused of bribery so that he can return to Souad and their daughter Nawal (played by a child actress named “Wazza”). Jalal meets his lawyer friend Salah (Abdel Aziz Kamel) and his diplomat friend Hamdi (Hussein Kandil), the latter of whom is traveling to work in Japan, and the three go into a bar named Spiro, where bartender Shalabi (Mohamed Ahmed Al-Masry) holds court. Jalal drops an important document proving Ahmed's innocence from his bag. Jalal returns home to find his wife Soraya Abdelwahed (Mariam Fakhr Eddine) In bed and wakes up her to spend the night together. The next day, in court, Ahmed is found guilty due to lack of the document Jalal lost, which the attorney blames on his wife's carelessness. Jalal loses confidence in himself despite the encouragement of his assistant, Ezzat Effendi (Abdel Aziz Ahmed), to move on. Laila (Hind Rostom) comes to Jalal's office to seek protection from her ex-husband, Hassanein (Salah Mansour), but finds that Jalal is the one in need of help. After Laila leaves the office, Hassanein asks Jalal to help reconcile the couple, which Jalal attempts to no avail as he seeks to compensate for his feelings of loss by moving in with Laila on a houseboat on the shores of the Nile.

Jalal finally obtains the missing document. When he returns to his wife after learning he is pregnant and abandons Laila's yacht for good, Hassanein calls Soraya to inform her of Jalal's dalliance. Soraya hurries to the boat to find the door open and Laila's body on the ground wife next to a knife and grabs it, trying to wake her and screaming at the realization that Laila has been stabbed to death. Bystanders rush in, including obese neighbor Rose (Laila Hamdy), who yells at Soraya that she killed Laila. The crime dominates the newspapers, and Jalal is afraid to defend his wife due to his own low self-esteem, so he assigns his friend Salah to do so. Soraya's health deteriorates and she is hospitalized. Wanting to save his wife, Jalal discovers that the only way for the killer to arrive unnoticed would have been for them to come downriver by boat and leave the same way. Jalal is certain that Omar Shehata Abdelsamad (Hassan El Baroudi), a buoy guard who owns a small boat, is the only possible culprit. Using a cunning trick in front of the judges and prosecution, Jalal gets Omar to confess to killing her as a hit man for Hassanein, proving Soraya's innocence.
