= Grand Larceny =

- Original film poster
- Directed by: Jeannot Szwarc
- Written by: Peter Stone
- Produced by: Patrick Deschamps; Patrick Dromgoole; Robert Halmi Jr. Robert Halmi Sr. Jacques Méthé
- Starring: Marilu Henner; Omar Sharif; Louis Jourdan
- Cinematography: Tony Impey
- Edited by: Lyndon Matthews
- Music by: Irwin Fisch
- Production companies: Robert Halmi Inc. Societe Cinecom; FR3; HTV
- Distributed by: Taurus Video
- Release date: 1987
- Running time: 95 min.
- Countries: United Kingdom; United States; France
- Language: English

Grand Larceny is a 1987 thriller film directed by Jeannot Szwarc and starring Marilu Henner, Ian McShane, Omar Sharif and Louis Jourdan.

== Plot summary ==
Freddy Grand, a woman estranged from her father, Charles Grand, for 18 years, travels to his estate on the French Riviera after learning of his death. There she carries out his final wishes and begins to learn something about his past. Freddy discovers Charles, a thief who served time in prison but was approached by an insurance company on his release to employ his talent in helping them to recover some stolen valuables. A reformed man of many years before his death, he wishes Freddy to continue his work.

== Cast ==
- Marilu Henner - Freddy Grand
- Ian McShane - Flanagan
- Omar Sharif - Rashid Saud
- Louis Jourdan - Charles Grand
- Phillip Tan - Shomin
