= Ahmed Salim (producer) =

British social entrepreneur

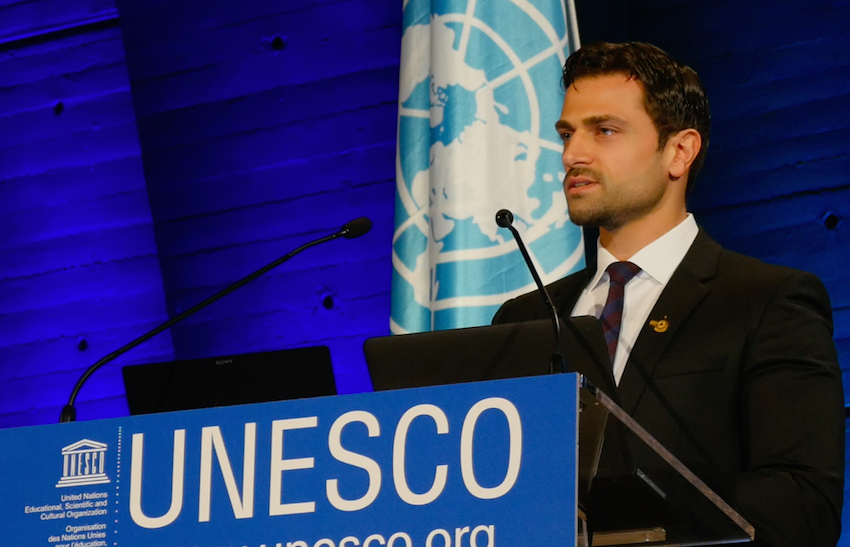
- Ahmed Salim at the launch of the International Year of Light 2015, at UNESCO headquarters in Paris on 19 January 2015
- Occupation: Producer

Ahmed Salim is a British social entrepreneur and producer of transmedia productions including films, international exhibitions, live shows, books and educational and social campaigns. Ahmed Salim is on The 500 Most Influential Muslims lists of 2015, 2016, 2017 and 2018.

His films have been seen by more than 100 million people and his exhibitions have received over 15 million visitors around the world.

== UNESCO ==
In November 2014, Ahmed Salim announced a partnership between UNESCO and 1001 Inventions to support the United Nations proclaimed International Year of Light 2015 as founding partners and the launch of a global campaign to celebrate the work of 11th century scientist Ibn Al-Haytham in optics. UNESCO Director General Irina Bokova formalised the partnership during the high-profile opening ceremony of the International Year of Light at the UNESCO headquarters in Paris on 19 January 2015 during which Ahmed Salim addressed the audience. The global campaign engaged more than 25 million people in 2015

In October 2018, Ahmed Salim announced a new partnership between UNESCO and 1001 Inventions to support the United Nations proclaimed International Year of the Periodic Table and Chemical Elements 2019. The official opening was held at the UNESCO headquarters in Paris on 29 January 2019.

== World Food Programme ==
In December 2018, Ahmed Salim launched a new initiative called 1001 Meals, with World Food Programme and 1001 Inventions, to support the wellbeing of children in refugee camps through educational events combined with healthy meals.

== Animal Welfare ==
In 2020, Ahmed Salim launched 1001 Paws, an animal welfare initiative supporting stray and abandoned animals. 1001 Paws co-ordinates 700 volunteers and rescuers to help deal with the rising populations of stray and abandoned cats and dogs in the Middle East and North Africa.

== National Geographic ==
As a part of a partnership with National Geographic, A 1001 Inventions interactive science exhibition was hosted at National Geographic Museum in Washington DC. National Geographic have published three books produced by Ahmed Salim, Ibn Al-Haytham: The Man Who Discovered How We See, 1001 Inventions and Awesome Facts from Muslim Civilization and 1001 Inventions the Enduring Legacy of Muslim Civilization.

== 1001 Inventions ==
Ahmed Salim is the producer and director of 1001 Inventions, a UK-based educational and science and cultural heritage organisation., It produces global educational programmes, exhibitions, live shows, short films, books and educational resources.

== Films ==
His short film, 1001 Inventions and the Library of Secrets starring Sir Ben Kingsley, has been downloaded 100 million times and won 27 international gold and grand prix awards including Best Education Film from Cannes, London, New York and Los Angeles film festivals.

In 2015, Ahmed Salim produced and directed a short feature film starring actor Omar Sharif on the story of 11th-century scientist Ibn Al-Haytham as he embarks upon a quest to uncover ancient mysteries. Sharif came out of retirement specifically to participate in this film which has been selected by UNESCO as an official film supporting the United Nations proclaimed International Year of Light 2015. The film premiered during the 2015 Dubai International Film Festival

In 2008, Salim produced an educational short film starring Her Royal Highness Queen Rania of Jordan called How'd That Get Here? that was premiered online.

== Music ==
Ahmed Salim is a Producer and Director of ETM International and Andante Studios, music and record labels that represent and produce music from the international artist and musician Sami Yusuf. Together, they produced and released the music video 'Shine' as part of the United Nations proclaimed 2015 International Year of Light.
