= Vugraph =

Method of displaying Bridge play

Vugraph (or Viewgraph) is a method of displaying the bidding and play of bridge hands on a screen for viewing by an audience. The basis of the current computer-generated display was originally developed by Fred Gitelman for the American Contract Bridge League in 1991 under a grant from the estate of Peter Pender, a champion player. Then known as PenderGraph, the software program was first used at the 1991 Summer North American Bridge Championships at Las Vegas. The program was substantially revised in 1993 to work under the Microsoft Windows operating system. Archived Vugraph data can be found from various databases and the most complete collection of bridge data is the Vugraph Project.

The term and practice date back at least to 1959, when its use was reported in The New York Times.

== See also ==
- Bridge-O-Rama
