= Bridge-O-Rama =

System of electro-mechanical display boards

Bridge-O-Rama was a system of electro-mechanical display boards on which an audience could view a representation of the bidding and play of hands at high-level contract bridge tournaments. Developed in Italy and first used in the World Championships at the Bermuda Bowl in 1958, representations of the actual playing cards in each hand were arranged in frames on the display and were able to be lit from behind as play progressed. The lighting was operated by a number of switches at a control console wired to the displays.

In a typical team-of-four match, the audience would be advised about the results in one room and would watch the replay by team members in the other room as expert officials provided analysis and commentary on the bidding and play.

== See also ==
- Vugraph
