= Sleepless (1957 film) =

1957 Egyptian film by Salah Abu Seif

- Sleepless DVD cover
- Arabic: لا أنام
- Directed by: Salah Abouseif; Tolba Radwan
- Screenplay by: El Sayed Bedeir; Saleh Gawdat; Salah Ezz el-Din
- Story by: Ihsan Abdel Quddous
- Based on: Sleepless
- Produced by: Abdelhalim Nasr; Artists Union
- Starring: Faten Hamama; Yehia Chahine; Mariam Fakhr Eddine; Omar Sharif; Emad Hamdy; Hind Rostom; Rushdy Abaza
- Cinematography: Mahmoud Nasr; Abdelhalim Nasr; Hassan Dahesh
- Edited by: Emile Bahri; Hussain Ahmed; Alfred Bahri
- Music by: Fouad El-Zahry (soundtrack)
- Production company: Dollar Film
- Distributed by: Rotana (DVD); Dollar Film
- Release date: October 31, 1957 (Egypt)
- Running time: 127 minutes
- Country: Egypt
- Language: Arabic

Sleepless (Arabic: لا أنام, translit. La Anam) is a 1957 Egyptian melodrama film. The film follows the intricate story of Nadia Lutfi, a daughter of divorced parents who suffers from Electra complex, which drives her to intervene in her father's relationships.

Directed by the Egyptian film director Salah Abu Seif, this film is based on a novel with the same name written by the Egyptian novelist Ihsan Abdel Quddous. The film, which is currently ranked the 29th best Egyptian film by the cinema committee of the Supreme Council of Culture in Cairo, starred Faten Hamama, Yehia Chahine, Mariam Fakhr Eddine, Omar Sharif, Emad Hamdy, Hind Rostom and Rushdy Abaza. It was released on DVD as part of the Egyptian Cinema Classics film collection. Sleepless is one of the ten first Egyptian colored films.

== Plot ==
Faten Hamama plays Nadia Lutfi, a young woman who belongs to an aristocratic, upper-class family. After her parents divorce each other, her father (Yehia Chahine) wins custody of her. She lives with her father and over the years develops a very close and strong relationship with him to the extent of being sexually attracted towards him, an obsessive behavior known as Electra complex.

At the age of 18, she plunges into a premature relationship with Mustafah (Imad Hamdi), a writer and journalist who is quite a bit older than she is. Meanwhile, her father meets and falls in love with another woman, Safia (Mariam Fakhr Eddine). He decides to marry her, which Nadia is forced to accept. However, her father gradually starts spending more time with his new wife, which galls and displeases Nadia who does not receive an equal amount of love and attention anymore. This compels and drives her to step in and ruin their relationship. Now seeing Safia as her enemy, Nadia plots for revenge from her stepmother. Nadia accuses Safia of having an affair with Aziz (Omar Sharif), Nadia's young uncle.

To convince her father, Nadia had to ask her friend Kawthar (Hind Rostom), a voluptuous and licentious woman, to seduce her father. Nadia's successful conspiracy results in a divorce between Safia and her father. Not only that, Nadia's father decides to marry her. Enticed by the wealth of Nadia's father, she agrees to marry him. Nadia is devastated when she discovers that Kawthar is having an affair with another young man, Samir (Rushdy Abaza), realizing that Kawthar is only living with her father for his fortunes.

Mustafah, who had secretly admired Safia, proposed to her after her divorce with Nadia's father. Nadia conceals the truth from her father, worried that such a revelation might strike and shatter him. Her father finds about Samir. Nadia, finding no escape route, lies and tells her father that he is her fiancé. Kawthar nefariously adds that Nadia and Samir are getting married, which Nadia is forced to accept. On the night of her wedding, Nadia shocks her father and the wedding attendants with the startling truth, leaving her father traumatized.

At the end of the film, one of the candles fallen in Nadia's wedding dress, so she became burned. Nadia taken to the hospital and she became deformed.

== Cast ==
- Faten Hamama as Nadia Lutfi
- Yehia Chahine as Nadia's father
- Mariam Fakhr Eddine as Safia
- Imad Hamdi as Mustafah
- Hind Rostom as Kawthar
- Rushdy Abaza as Samir
- Omar Sharif as Aziz

== Reception ==
La Anam premiered at the Cinema Miami theater in Cairo on November 31, 1957, and was met with a lot of success and recognition in Egypt and the Arab-speaking world. This was mainly due to the star-studded cast and the fact that it was one of the earliest colored Egyptian films. The film has maintained its popularity and has been selected amongst the Top 100 Egyptian films in 1996 by the Egyptian Film association. However, due to its controversial topic, it wasn't frequently broadcast on television.

== Trivia ==
- The well-known Egyptian actress Nadia Lutfi got her stage name from Nadia Lutfi in Sleepless.
