= International Year of Light =

2015 United Nations observance

International Year of Light 2015
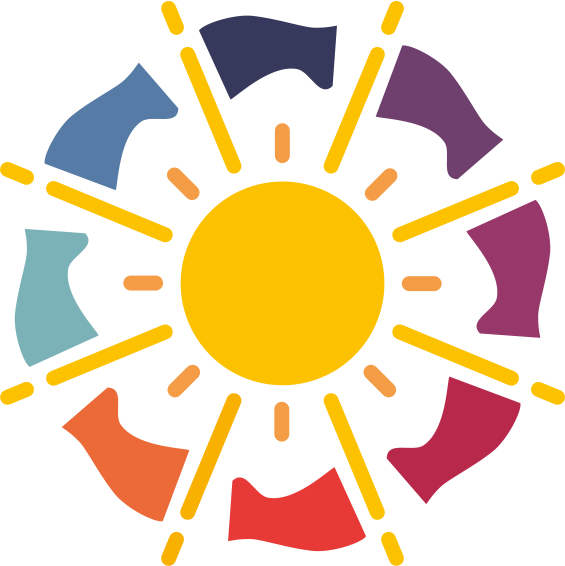
- International Year of Light logo
- Date: 1 January – 31 December 2015
- Type: Exhibitions
- Website: light2015.org

The International Year of Light and Light-based Technologies 2015 or International Year of Light 2015 (IYL 2015) was a United Nations observance that aimed to raise awareness of the achievements of light science and its applications, and its importance to humankind. IYL 2015 opening ceremonies was held on 19–20 January 2015 in Paris.

== History ==
The International Year of Light is "a global initiative adopted by the United Nations to raise awareness of how optical technologies promote sustainable development and provide solutions to worldwide challenges in energy, education, agriculture, communications and health."

UNESCO delegates from Ghana and Mexico introduced the proposal to the executive board, explaining the motivation and mission underlying the International Year of Light. The resolution was adopted by the executive board joined by co-signatories from a further 28 Board Members. The resolution proposing an IYL 2015 was placed before the 190th Session of the UNESCO executive board held in Paris from 13–18 October 2012 by Ghana, Mexico, and the Russian Federation (Board Members) and New Zealand (UNESCO Member State).

The resolution A/RES/68/221 proclaiming the IYL 2015 was adopted on 20 December 2013 during a plenary meeting of the 68th Session of the UN General Assembly, with the General Assembly acting on the recommendation of its Second Committee (Economic and Financial) during consideration of an Agenda item on Science and Technology for Development.

Prince Andrew, Duke of York is a patron of IYL 2015.

=== Organization ===
The IYL 2015 has been endorsed by a number of international Scientific Unions and the International Council for Science. The IYL 2015 will be administered by an International steering committee convened by John M. Dudley in collaboration with the UNESCO International Basic Sciences Programme and a Secretariat at The Abdus Salam International Centre for Theoretical Physics which is a UNESCO Category 1 Institute.

The Founding Scientific Sponsors of IYL2015 are:

- European Physical Society
- SPIE
- Optical Society
- IEEE Photonics Society
- American Physical Society
- The international lightsources.org network

=== Stakeholders ===
The 2015 International Year brings together many different stakeholders including UNESCO, scientific societies and unions, educational and research institutions, technology platforms, non-profit organizations and private sector partners to promote and celebrate the significance of light and its applications during 2015.

- African Physical Society
- Ghana Academy of Arts and Sciences
- International Commission for Optics
- International Union for Pure and Applied Physics
- Russian Academy of Sciences
- New Zealand Institute of Physics
- Royal Society of New Zealand
- National Autonomous University of Mexico
- Istituto Veneto di Scienze, Lettere ed Arti with Within Light Inside Glass

== Activities ==
=== Opening ceremony ===
The International Year of Light was officially launched on 19 January 2015 with a two-day opening ceremony at UNESCO Headquarters in Paris. The opening ceremony introduced the key themes of the year, acting as inspiration for events worldwide during 2015. Over a thousand participants attended the event. Speakers and attendees included international diplomats and decision-makers, Nobel laureates, CEOs, and science and industry leaders from across the globe. The event also featured works from light artists around the world including Finnish light artist Kari Kola and US design team Light At Play.

=== US events ===
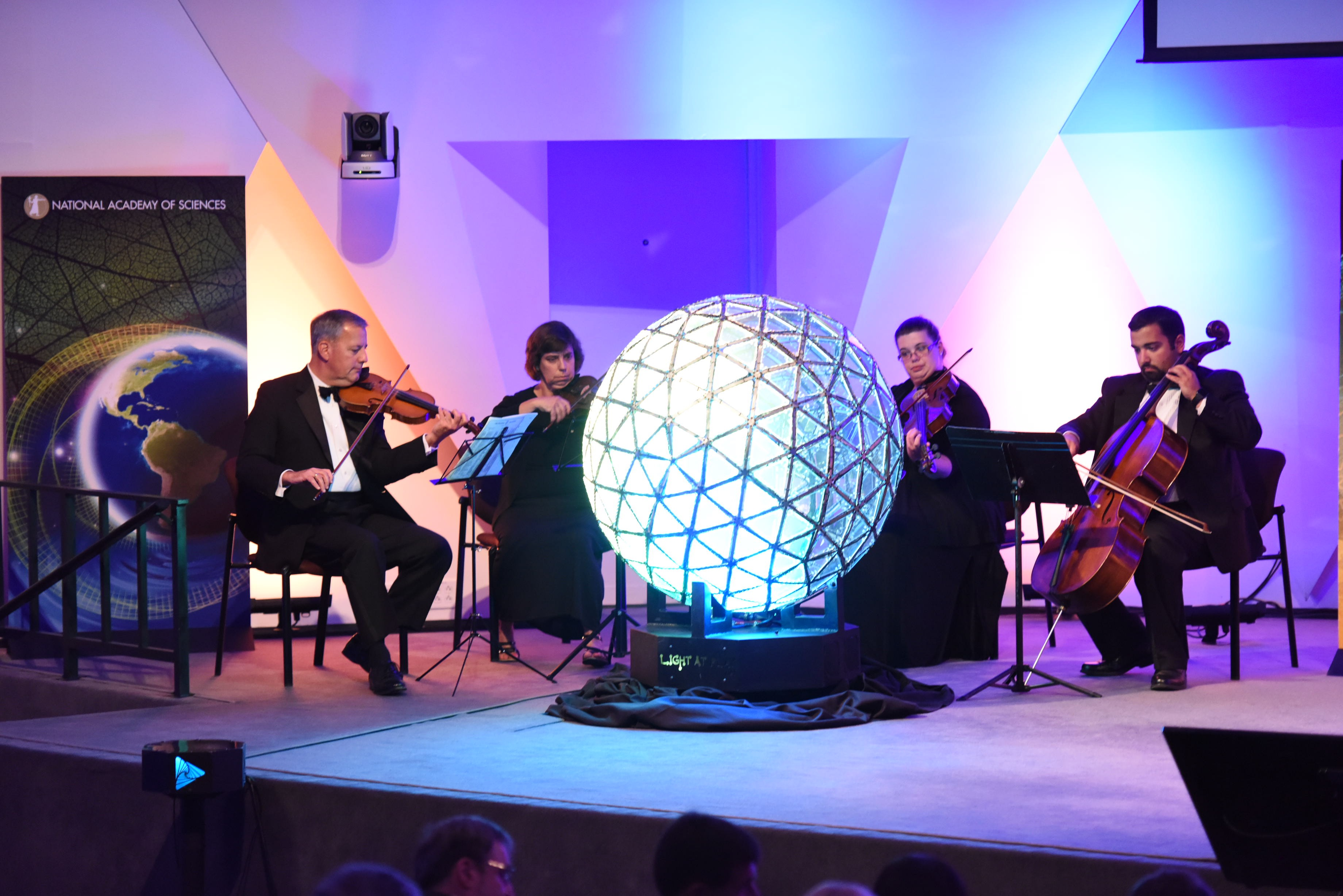
Musicians are bathed in LED light from the Radiance Orb, which responds to their playing before the start of the Light for a Better World celebration in Washington D.C. Credit: Jason Socrates Bardi.

The steering committee organized two flagship events in the United States: Wonders of Light: Family Science Fun held at the Smithsonian's National Museum of the American Indian and Light for a Better World – A Celebration of U.S. Innovation held at the National Academy of Sciences.

The Wonders of Light event was sponsored by the National Science Foundation and was attended by hundreds of children and their parents. Exhibits included a variety of hands-on-optics and photonics displays.

The Light for a Better World symposium was sponsored by numerous organizations including the National Science Foundation, National Academy of Sciences, The Optical Society, American Institute of Physics, American Physical Society, IEEE Photonics Society and SPIE. Speakers at the event included: 2014 Nobel laureate Shuji Nakamura, National Science Foundation director France Córdova, Michael Liehr (SUNY Polytechnic), Gerald Duffy (General Electric) and 2014 Nobel laureate Eric Betzig.

=== Ibn al-Haytham campaign ===
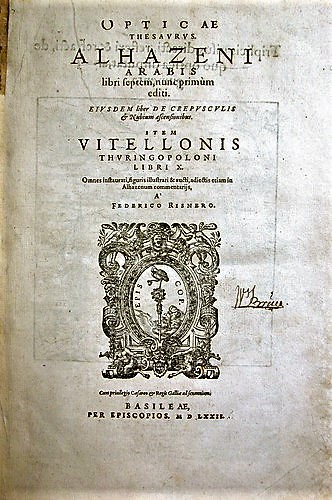
Ibn al-Haytham's Book of Optics cover page

The IYL 2015 launched at the UNESCO headquarters in Paris on 19 January 2015, with the unveiling of 1001 Inventions and the World of Ibn Al-Haytham which is a global campaign that includes a series of interactive exhibits, workshops and live shows about Ibn al-Haytham's achievements in optics, mathematics and astronomy, and his importance in laying the foundations of the present day scientific experimental method. The campaign was created by the 1001 Inventions organisation, which is a founding partner of the International Year of Light.

As part of the international campaign, UNESCO will also host an exhibition and a conference, to take place on 14 September 2015, titled The Islamic Golden Age of Science for the Knowledge-Based Society. In line with the event three organizations from Hyderabad viz MS Academy, Mesco and ILM Foundation launched i Quiz 2015 – a National level quiz competition on ‘Golden Age of Science’. The competition will be held across 64 cities in India and the grand finale will be held in Hyderabad

=== Scientific anniversaries ===
The major scientific anniversaries that will be celebrated during IYL 2015 are:

- 1015: Works on optics by Ibn Al-Haytham
- 1815: The notion of light as a wave proposed by Fresnel
- 1865: The electromagnetic theory of light propagation proposed by Maxwell
- 1915: Einstein's theory of the photoelectric effect in 1905 and of the embedding of light in cosmology through general relativity
- 1965: Discovery of the cosmic microwave background by Penzias and Wilson, and Charles Kao's achievements concerning the transmission of light in fibers for optical communication
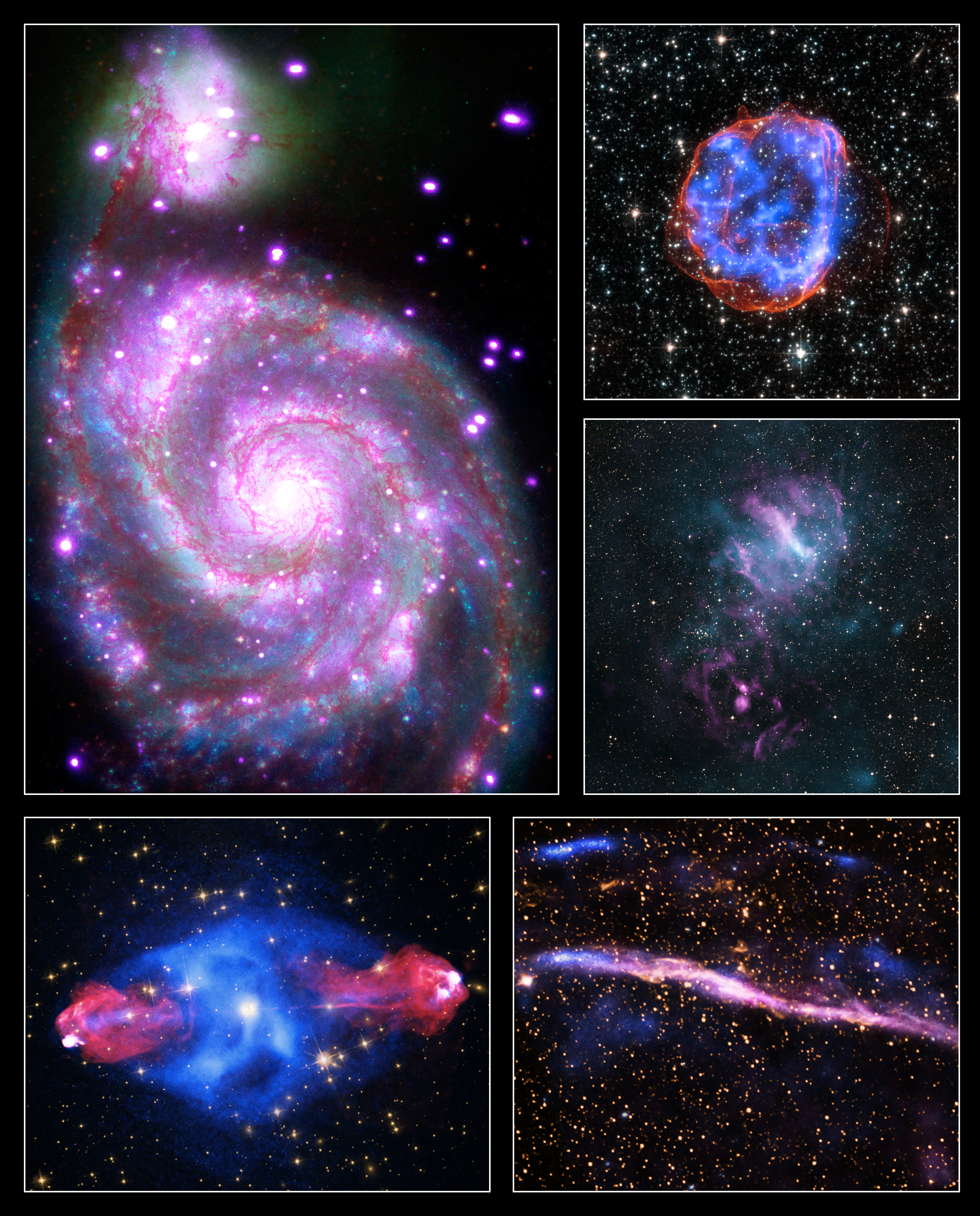
NASA images celebrating the International Year of Light 2015 (Chandra X-Ray Observatory; 22 January 2015).

=== International conference: Colombia in the International Year of Light 2015 ===
The International conference Colombia in the International Year of Light 2015 will be hosted by three universities of Colombia in 16–19 June 2015. The conference will allow for discussions about the state-of-the-art in this field, in the company of world-renowned scientists (See the scientific programme and the conference announcements). Organizers of this conference include: The Universidad de los Andes (University of the Andes), Bogotá, the Universidad Nacional de Colombia (National University of Colombia), Bogotá and Medellín, the Universidad de Antioquia (University of Antioquia), Medellín, the Academia Colombiana de Ciencias Exactas, Físicas y Naturales (Colombian Academy of Exact, Physical and Natural Sciences), Colombian research groups working on topics related to optical sciences, and academic programs at the undergraduate and graduate levels.

== See also ==
- International observance
- 2015 in science
