= List of Egyptian films of 1966 =

A list of films produced in Egypt in 1966. For an A-Z list of films currently on Wikipedia, see Category:Egyptian films.

== 1966 ==
Title	Director	Cast	Genre	Notes
1966
Al-Kahira 30 (Cairo 30)	Salah Abu Seif	Souad Hosni, Ahmed Mazhar, Hamdy Ahmed	Drama	
El mustahil (The Impossible)	Hussein Kamal	Nadia Lutfi, Kamal el-Shennawi	Drama	
Mirati Modeer Aam (My Wife, the Director General)	Fatin Abdel Wahab	Salah Zulfikar, Shadia	Romantic comedy	
Saghira Ala El Hob (Too Young for Love)	Niazi Mostafa	Souad Hosni, Rushdy Abaza	Romantic comedy	
3 Losoos (Three Thieves)	Hassan Al-Imam, Fatin Abdel Wahab, Kamal El Sheikh	Salah Zulfikar, Yehia Chahine, Farid Shawqi, Hind Rostom	Drama/ Comedy	
A Wife from Paris (Zawga mn Paris)	Atef Salim	Salah Zulfikar, Roushdy Abaza, Nabila Ebeid	Comedy, Romance	
Laylat El Zafaf (Wedding Night)	Henry Barakat	Souad Hosni, Ahmed Mazhar	Comedy	
