= 28th Venice International Film Festival =

Italian film festival in 1967

- Location: Venice, Italy
- Founded: 1932
- Awards: Golden Lion: Belle de Jour
- Festival date: 26 August – 8 September 1967
- Website: Website

Venice Film Festival chronology
- 29th 27th

The 28th annual Venice International Film Festival was held from 26 August to 8 September 1967.

Italian writer and journalist Alberto Moravia was the Jury President. The Golden Lion winner was Belle de Jour directed by Luis Buñuel.

== Jury ==
- Alberto Moravia, Italian writer and journalist - Jury President
- Carlos Fuentes, Mexican writer
- Juan Goytisolo, Spanish writer and poet
- Erwin Leiser, West-German filmmaker and actor
- Violette Morin, French writer
- Susan Sontag, American writer, philosopher and activist
- Rostislav Yurenev, Soviet film critic

== Official selection ==
The following films were selected to be screened:

=== In Competition ===
English title	Original title	Director(s)	Production country
Belle de Jour		Luis Buñuel	France, Italy
China Is Near	La Cina è vicina	Marco Bellocchio	Italy
La Chinoise	La Chinoise, ou plutôt à la Chinoise: un film en train de se faire	Jean-Luc Godard	France
Dutchman		Anthony Harvey	United Kingdom
The Head of the Family	Il padre di famiglia	Nanni Loy	Italy
Late Season	Útószezon	Zoltán Fábri	Hungary
Lust for Love	Mahlzeiten	Edgar Reitz	West Germany
The Morning	Jutro	Puriša Đorđević	Yugoslavia
The Nun's Night	Noc nevěsty	Karel Kachyňa	Czechoslovakia
Our Mother's House		Jack Clayton	United Kingdom
Oedipus Rex	Edipo re	Pier Paolo Pasolini	Italy
The Shepherds of Calamity	Οι βοσκοί	Nikos Papatakis	Greece
The Stranger	Lo straniero	Luchino Visconti	Italy
The Subversives	I sovversivi	Paolo and Vittorio Taviani	Italy
Voyage of Silence	O Salto	Christian de Chalonge	France

=== Out of Competition ===
English title	Original title	Director(s)	Production country
Deadly Sweet	Col cuore in gola	Tinto Brass	Italy
Desert People		Ian Dunlop	Australia
Detour	Otklonenie	Grisha Ostrovski, Todor Stoyanov	Bulgaria
Festival		Murray Lerner	United States
Jaguar		Jean Rouch	France
Mexico-Mexico		François Reichenbach	France, Mexico
Mouchette		Robert Bresson	France
Tattoo	Tätowierung	Johannes Schaaf	West Germany
Three Nights of Love	Egy szerelem három éjszakája	György Révész	Hungary
Trace of a Girl	Spur eines Mädchens	Gustav Ehmck	West Germany
The Wall	Le Mur	Serge Roullet	France

== Official Awards ==
=== Main Competition ===
- Golden Lion: Belle de Jour by Luis Buñuel
- Special Jury Prize:
  - La Chinoise by Jean-Luc Godard
  - China is Near by Marco Bellocchio
- Volpi Cup for Best Actor: Ljubiša Samardžić for Jutro
- Volpi Cup for Best Actress: Shirley Knight for Dutchman
- Best First Work: Lust for Love by Edgar Reitz
- Best Short Film: From One to Eight by Hristo Kovachev

== Independent Awards ==
=== FIPRESCI Prize ===
- China is Near by Marco Bellocchio
- Samurai Rebellion by Masaki Kobayashi

=== OCIC Award ===
- O Salto by Christian de Chalonge

=== Pasinetti Award ===
- Belle de Jour by Luis Buñuel
- Parallel Sections: Mouchette by Robert Bresson

=== Golden Rudder ===
- Il padre di famiglia by Nanni Loy
