= A Wife from Paris =

- Directed by: Atef Salem
- Screenplay by: Abdel Hai Adib; Amina El Sawy
- Produced by: Mounir Rafla
- Starring: Salah Zulfikar; Roushdy Abaza; Fouad El-Mohandes; Nabila Ebeid
- Cinematography: Cello Cicivelli
- Edited by: Abdelaziz Fakhry
- Music by: Ali Ismael
- Distributed by: Egyptian General Organization for Cinema and Television
- Release date: 24 July 1966
- Running time: 115 minutes
- Country: Egypt
- Language: Arabic

A Wife from Paris (Arabic: زوجة من باريس, translit. Zawga Mn Paris) is a 1966 Egyptian romantic comedy film directed by Atef Salem.

== Cast ==
- Salah Zulfikar as Dr. Wagih
- Roushdy Abaza as Nagi
- Fouad El Mohandes as Daoud
- Nabila Ebeid as Samia
- Karima El Sherif (Dr. Wagih’s wife, also named Samia)
- Ahmed al-Haddad (Othman, a professor)
- Amin El-Heinedy (Sheikh Hawash, the Al-Masih ad-Dajjal or Muslim Antichrist)
- Abdel Ghani Nagdi (Abdel Dayem)
- Hussein Ismail (Imran)
- Hassan Atla (delivery truck owner)
- Sayed Abdullah (mayor)
- Poussi (Abdel Dayem’s daughter)
- Ibrahim Hechmat (Badr, one of the men at the oasis)
- Alwiya Gamil (Dr. Wagih’s mother-in-law)
- Eskandar Mansy (station official)
- Mary Bay Bay

== Synopsis ==
An oasis named Paris hosts a small town in the New Valley Governorate. As the 1952 Egyptian revolution brews, Dr. Wagih flees there, but his wife Samia refuses to follow him under pressure from her mother. Samia returns to Cairo, and Dr. Wagih is left to get to know his new neighbors. These include Nagi, an engineer embittered by a woman’s betrayal, and Daoud, a principal and head teacher at the local primary school looking for a wife who finds one in town. Samia returns to live with her husband, and Nagi marries a new social worker who charms away his surliness and also happens to be named Samia.

== See also ==
- Cinema of Egypt
- Lists of Egyptian films
- Salah Zulfikar filmography
- List of Egyptian films of 1966
- List of Egyptian films of the 1960s
