= The Beginning and the End (1960 film) =

1960 film

- Directed by: Salah Abouseif
- Written by: Naguib Mahfouz
- Starring: Omar Sharif; Sanaa Gamil
- Music by: Fouad El Zahery
- Release date: 1960
- Country: Egypt
- Language: Arabic

The Beginning and the End (Egyptian Arabic: بداية و نهاية) is a 1960 Egyptian film directed by Salah Abouseif and based on the 1950 novel by the same name. It was the first film adapted from a novel written by Naguib Mahfouz. The Beginning and the End is the 7th in the top 10 films of the list of the Top 100 Egyptian films of all time.

At the 2nd Moscow International Film Festival in 1961, the film was nominated for the Grand Prix award. For her role as Nefisah, Sanaa Gamil won the award for Best Supporting Actress.

== Plot ==
The film portrays the lives of the members of an Egyptian family, who are three brothers, their sister Nefisah (Sanaa Gamil) and their mother (Amina Rizk), after the family's patriarch's death.

The older brother Hasan (Farid Shawki) turns to crime, while the younger brother, Hussien, leaves Cairo to work in another city. The youngest brother, Hassanein (Omar Sharif), aspires to be an officer, and in order to achieve that he puts his family into financial difficulties.

Nefisah falls in love and has an affair with the local grocer's son (Salah Mansour) and when he doesn't marry her, she works as a prostitute to support her brother.

The tragic ending of the film is one of the most memorable in Egyptian films; Nefisah gets arrested by the police and her brother Hassanien bails her out. After an intense argument between her and her brother, Nefisah commits suicide by throwing herself in the Nile followed by her brother, who throws himself in too.

== Cast ==
- Omar Sharif as Hassanien
- Sanaa Gamil as Nefisah
- Farid Shawki as Hasan
- Amina Rizk as the mother
- Salah Mansour as the grocer's son
- Amal Zayed
