= Mother of the Bride =

Mother of the Bride may refer to:

- Mother of the Bride (1963 film), an Egyptian film
- Mother of the Bride (1993 film), an American TV film
- Mother of the Bride (2024 film), an American film
