= Rubabikia =

- Directed by: Fayez Halawa
- Written by: Fayez Halawa
- Starring: Salah Zulfikar; Taheyya Kariokka
- Release date: 1967
- Running time: 3 hours
- Country: Egypt
- Language: Egyptian Arabic

Rubabikia (Arabic: روبابيكيا; translit: Robabikya), is a 1967 Egyptian comedy play, starring Salah Zulfikar and Taheyya Kariokka. It is written and directed by Fayez Halawa. The play shows the corruption in cultural life and in the media, and how much this can create a myth out of a lie.

== Synopsis ==
A junior writer (Salah Zulfikar) buys some papers containing a novel from a second hand seller of Rubabikia (Taheyya Kariokka) and puts his name on it, and the deviant propaganda tool undertakes the necessary propaganda work, stating that the novel "Clover is Calling You Green" is the pinnacle of the literary work. A fake actress (Nabila Ebeid), all of her qualifications are her beauty granted to the producers and directors, stars in it, and then its real unknown author, Muhammad Al-Hayyun (Waheed Saif), appears. Some ironies happen.

== Cast ==
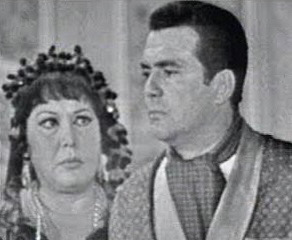
Salah Zulfikar and Taheyya Kariokka in Rubabikia

- Salah Zulfikar
- Taheyya Kariokka
- Nabila Ebeid
- Fayez Halawa
- Waheed Saif
- Badr Al-Din Jamjoom
- Hassan Hussein
- Samia Mohsen
- Saif Allah Mukhtar
