= Taheyya Kariokka =

Egyptian belly dancer and actress (1915–1999)

- تحية كاريوكا
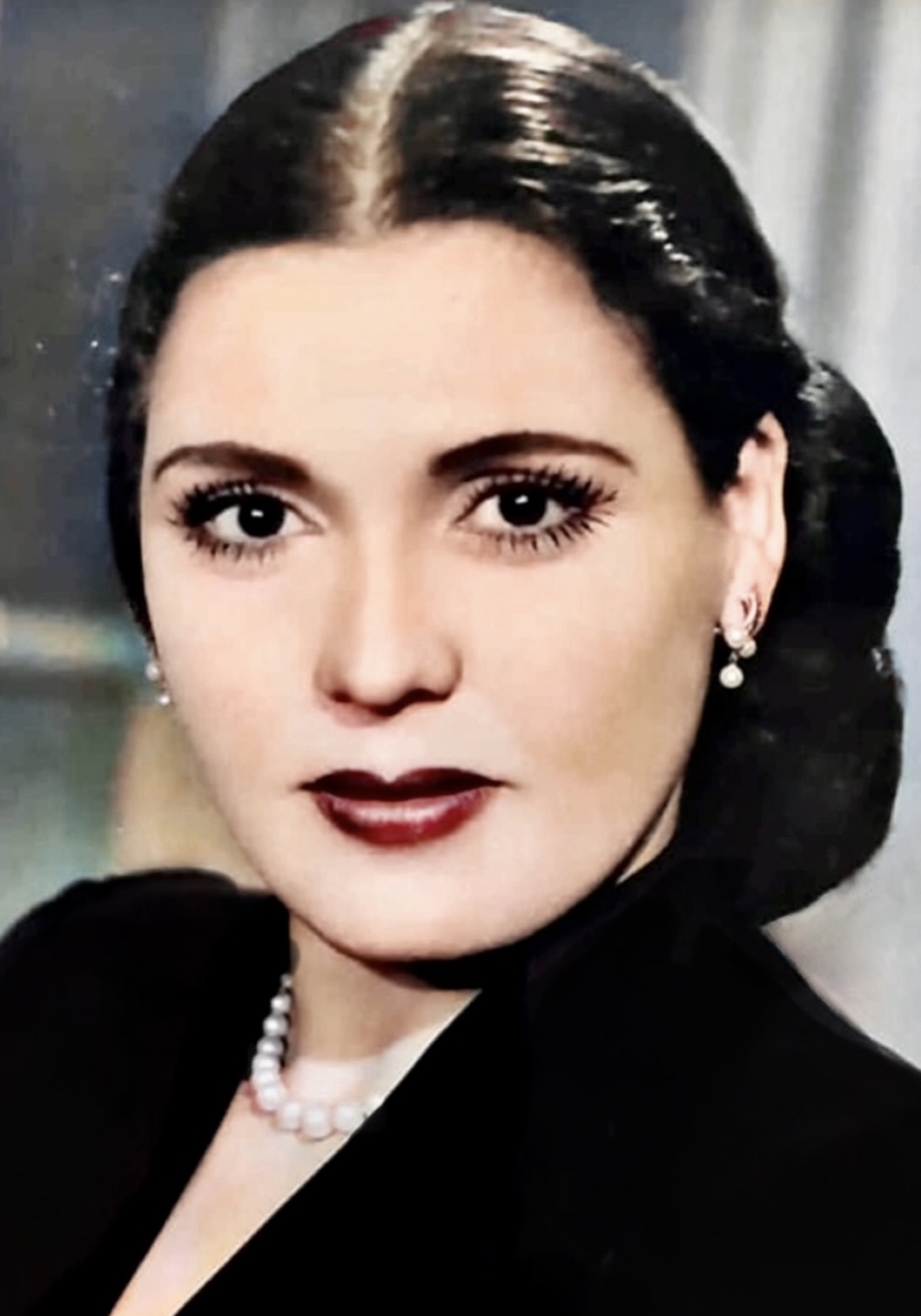
- Taheyya Kariokka, c. 1941
- Born: Badaweya Taheyya Mohamed Ali Elnedany Kareem; 22 February 1915; Ismailia, Egypt
- Died: 20 September 1999 (aged 84); Cairo, Egypt
- Citizenship: Egyptian
- Occupations: Actress and dancer
- Years active: 1935–1998

Taheyya Kariokka (Egyptian Arabic: تحيه كاريوكا) also Tahiya Carioca (born Badaweya Taheyya Mohamed Ali Elnedany Kareem (Egyptian Arabic: بدويه تحيه محمد علي النيدانى كريم), (February 22, 1915 (Note: Her year of birth was 1915 according to author Barbara Sellers-Young, 1919 according to the Encyclopedia Britannica, and 1920 according to her New York Times obituary.) – September 20, 1999) was an Egyptian belly dancer and film actress.

== Early life ==
Badaweya was born in the Egyptian city of Ismaïlia to Mohamed Ali Elnedany and Fatma Elzharaa. Her father was a boat merchant who had married 6 times. It is said that Badawiya's father was around 60 years old during the time her mother was in her early twenties. Badawiya was barely able to speak when her father died. After the death of her father, Badaweya was sent to live with her older half-brother Ahmed Ali Elnedany. While there she was tortured, treated like a slave and locked in chains. Every time she tried to escape he would find her and torture her even more, till one day he shaved her hair.

== Career ==
With the help of her nephew Osman Elnedany, she escaped to Cairo to stay with Souad Mahasen, a night club owner and an artist. Tahiya had asked several times for employment in Suad's nightclub but Suad refused to employ her due to the disreputability of working at a nightclub. However, many of Suad's associates and friends became acquainted with Tahiya through various visits to Suad's home. They all advised Suad to add her to one of the shows as a chorus girl but still she refused.

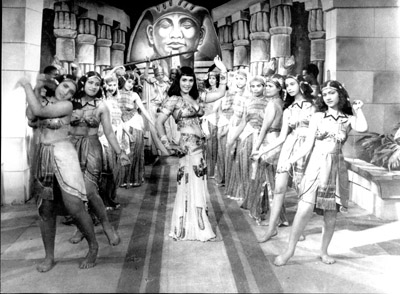
Taheyya Kariokka with an Ancient Egyptian outfit

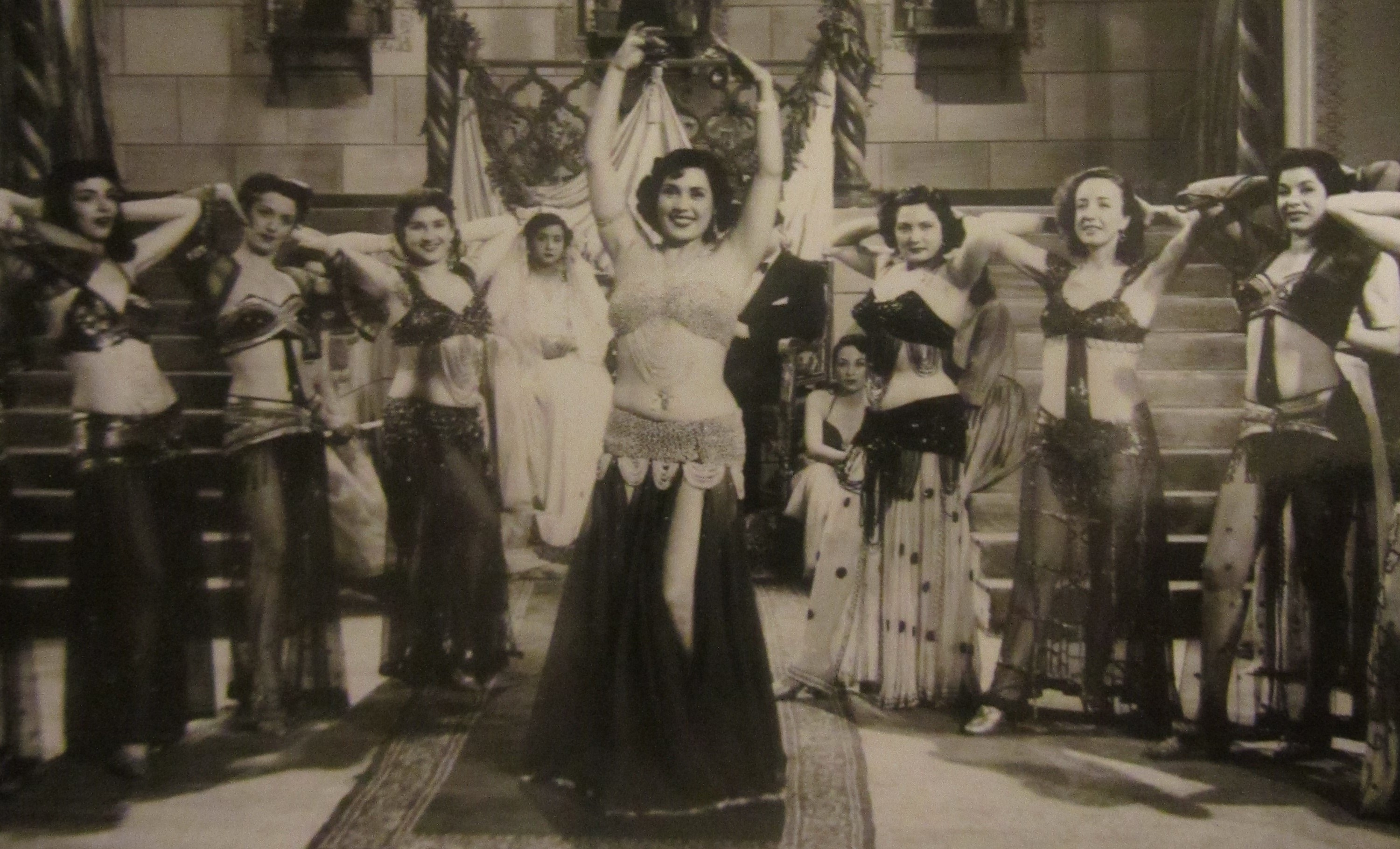
Taheyya Kariokka performing

Soon, Tahiya was mentioned to Badia Masabni, the owner of Casino Opera, one of the most prominent nightclubs of the time. Badia offered a position in her troupe to Tahiya. Tahiya accepted and was given the stage name Tahiya Mohamed. She soon began gaining popularity as a solo dancer and as she became more experienced she learned a popular Samba dance from Brazil at the time called the Carioca. After that she became known as Tahiya Kariokka. She began starring in movies during what is dubbed as the Egyptian film industry's "Golden Age", such as The Leech, Love and Adoration, and Mother of the Bride. She was a talented dancer, singer, and actress. Kariokka was a film, stage and television actress, she worked on stage in several plays, of her most notable plays was the 1967 black comedy Rubabikia. In 1969, the film Good Morning, My Dear Wife, starring Salah Zulfikar with Kariokka performing the supporting role, was released to become the highest grossing film of the year. Three years later, in 1972, the film Watch Out for ZouZou, starring Soad Hosni with Kariokka performing the supporting role as well, was released to become the biggest box-office hit in Egyptian cinema to date.

== Personal life ==
Taheyya married 14 times, some of them included high-profile artistic figures such as actor Rushdy Abaza and playwright Fayez Halawa. She also married a US army officer who took her to the US for a while before they divorced. Tahiya was unable to conceive any children of her own and hence adopted a daughter (Atiyat Allah). Tahiya also was very involved with her sibling's children. Tahiya later moved to London.

Tahyia died of a heart attack on September 20, 1999, aged 84.

== Filmography ==
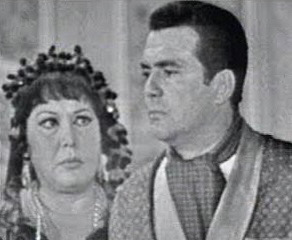
Kariokka with Salah Zulfikar in the 1967 political play; Rubabikia.

- Mercedes (1993)
- Iskanderiya, kaman wi kaman (Alexandria Again and Forever) (1990)
- Weda'an Bonapart (Adieu Bonaparte) (1985)
- Saqqa mat, al- (The Water-Carrier Is Dead) (Film, 1977)
- El-Karnak, (Karnak Café) (1975)
- Khally Balak Amin ZouZou, (Watch out For ZouZou) (1972)
- Sabah El Kheir ya Zawgaty El Aziza- (Good Morning, My Dear Wife) (1969)
- Rubabikia (1967) – (play)
- Khan El Khalili (1967)
- The Last-Born (1966)
- Tareek, al- (The Road) (1964)
- Omm el aroussa (Mother of the Bride) (1963)
- Oh Islam (1961)
- Hob hatta El-Ebada (Love and Adoration) (1960)
- The Boss (1958)
- El Fettewa (The Tough) (1957)
- Shabab Emraa (A Woman's Youth), also known as The Leech (1956)
- Samara (1956)
- Rommel's Treasure (1955)
- People of Love (1955)
- Hira wa chebab Ana zanbi eh? (Is It My Fault?) (1953)
- Ibn al ajar (A Child for Rent) (1953)
- Muntasir, El (The Conqueror) (1952)
- Omm el katila, El (The Criminal Mother) (1952)
- Zuhur el fatina, El (The Charming Flowers) (1952)
- Feiruz hanem (Mrs. Feiruz) (1951)
- Ibn el halal (The True-born Son) (1951)
- Khadaini abi (My Father Deceived Me) (1951)
- Bint Bariz (The Girl from Paris (1950)
- Akbal el bakari (A Large Family) (1950)
- Ayni bi-triff (My Eye Is Winking) (1950)
- Aheb el raks (I Like Dancing) (1949)
- Amirat el djezira (The Princess of the Island) (1949)
- Katel, El (The Murderer) (1949)
- Mandeel al helu (The Beauty's Veil) (1949)
- Hub wa junun (Love and Madness) (1948)
- Ibn el fellah (The Peasant's Son) (1948)
- Yahia el fann (Long Live Art) (1948)
- Li'bat al sitt (The Lady's Puppet) (1946)
- Ma akdarshi (I Can't Do It) (1946)
- Najaf (1946)
- Sabr tayeb, El (Have Patience) (1946)
- Aheb el baladi (I Like Home Cooking) (1945)
- Hub El awal, El (First Love) (1945)
- Lailat el jumaa (Friday Evening) (1945)
- Naduga (1944)
- Rabiha-takiet el ekhfaa (The Magic Hat) (1944)
- Taqiyyat al ikhfa (1944)
- Ahlam El shabab (Dreams of Youth) (1943)
- Ahib Al ghalat (I Like Mistakes) (1942)

== See also ==
- Women in dance
