= The Second Wife (1967 film) =

- Directed by: Salah Abu Seif
- Written by: Ahmad Roshdy Saleh; Mohamed Mostafa Samy; Saad Eldin Wahba; Salah Abu Seif
- Produced by: Ramses Naguib
- Starring: Soad Hosny; Shoukry Sarhan
- Cinematography: Abdel Halim Nasr
- Edited by: Saeed El-Sheikh
- Music by: Fouad El Zahry; Salah Jahin; Sayed Mekawy
- Release date: 14 October 1967
- Running time: 112 minutes
- Country: Egypt
- Language: Arabic

The Second Wife (Arabic: الزوجة الثانية, translit. El Zawga El Thania) is a 1967 Egyptian drama film directed by Salah Abu Seif.

== Cast ==
- Soad Hosny as Fatma
- Shoukry Sarhan as Abou El Ela
- Sanaa Gamil as Hafiza
- Salah Mansour as Mayor
- Soheir El Morshedi
- Mohamed Noah
- Abdelmonem Ibrahim
- Hassan El Baroudy
