= The Head of the Family (1967 film) =

- Spanish poster
- Directed by: Nanni Loy
- Written by: Nanni Loy; Giorgio Arlorio; Ruggero Maccari
- Produced by: Turi Vasile
- Starring: Nino Manfredi; Leslie Caron; Ugo Tognazzi
- Cinematography: Armando Nannuzzi
- Edited by: Franco Fraticelli
- Music by: Carlo Rustichelli; Bruno Nicolai (music director)
- Production companies: M.N. Produzioni Cinematografiche, C.F.C. Marianne Productions; Ultra Film
- Distributed by: Allied Artists (US)
- Release date: 29 September 1967
- Running time: 110 minutes
- Language: Italian

The Head of the Family (Italian: Il padre di famiglia, French: Jeux d'adultes) is a 1967 Italian-French comedy-drama film co-written and directed by Nanni Loy. Starring Nino Manfredi, Leslie Caron and Ugo Tognazzi, it entered the main competition at the 28th Venice International Film Festival.

== Plot ==
The story centres on Marco and Paola, both architects, who meet after World War II and get married. Though deeply in love they come from different backgrounds, and do not share the same outlook on life. After the wedding, she gives up her work to instead dedicate herself to raising their growing family, and he, feeling abandoned by her, initiates an affair with one of his colleagues.

Following the various dramas of bringing up the children, who are schooled with the Montessori method, the wife goes to a clinic to recover from a nervous breakdown, while he, still in love with his wife, returns to his own family. When he's asked by a Census official, who is the Head of the Family, the husband does not know what to reply.

== Cast ==
- Nino Manfredi as Marco
- Leslie Caron as Paola
- Ugo Tognazzi as Romeo
- Claudine Auger as Adriana
- Mario Carotenuto as Paola's father
- Sergio Tofano as Amedeo, Marco's father
- Evi Maltagliati as Luisa, Marco's mother
- Elsa Vazzoler as Carla, Paola's mother
- Gino Pernice as Marco's colleague
- Raoul Grassilli as Neurologist
- Giampiero Albertini as Natalino
- Antonella Della Porta as Bonaria
- Marisa Solinas as Angela
- Paolo Bonacelli as Surveyor
- Luca Sportelli as Marco's colleague
- Rina Franchetti

== Production ==
The role of Paola, played by Leslie Caron, was originally intended for Anne Bancroft. Veteran actor Totò was originally cast as Romeo, the anarchist, but died two days after filming his first scene; he was replaced by Ugo Tognazzi. Principal cinematography started on March 1967.

== Release ==
The film premiered in competition at the 28th edition of the Venice Film Festival.

== Reception ==
The film was a major success, grossing over 828 million lire at the Italian box office. Ugo Tognazzi was nominated for the Nastro d'Argento for Best Supporting Actor, while for his performance in this film and in Italian Secret Service, Nino Manfredi was awarded with a Golden Plate at the 1968 David di Donatello Awards.
