= Mohamed Enani =

Egyptian translator (1939–2023)

Mohamed Enani (Arabic: محمد عناني; 4 January 1939 – 3 January 2023) was an Egyptian translator, fiction writer, dramatist, critic and scholar.

== Professional career ==
Born in Rosetta, El-Behera, Egypt, Enani obtained a B.A. (hons.) in English Language and Literature from Cairo University in 1959. He received his M.Phil. from London University in 1970 and his Ph.D. from Reading University, Berkshire in 1975. He produced more than 130 books in both Arabic and English, varying from translations to critical and creative works.

Enani was a foreign-language monitor at the BBC Monitoring Service in Caversham, Berkshire, from 1968 to 1975, while completing his M.Phil. from London University and his Ph.D. from Reading University.

He returned to Egypt in 1975 and worked as an English lecturer at Cairo University, also joining the Egyptian Writers Union. He was made an assistant professor of English in 1981 and was granted full tenure by Cairo University in 1986. Enani was head of the Department of English, 1993–1999.

Enani was elected an "expert" at the Arabic Language Academy in 1996. He was academic coordinator of Cairo Open University's English Translation Programme from 1997 to 2009, and has authored or revised all of the university's translation books and teaching manuals since 1997. From 1986 to 2003, he was general editor of the series Modern Arabic Literature – a series of Arabic literary works translated into English – with 75 titles, published by the state publishing house (GEBO). Since 2000, he has been in charge of the second series of A Thousand Books translated into Arabic, published by GEBO.

Enani had a number of Arabic plays staged in Cairo and the Egyptian provinces (seven originals, 3 adaptations and 3 translations) from 1964 to 2000. He has been the editor of Egyptian Theatre magazine since 1986, and co-editor of the Cairo monthly cultural publication Sutur from 1997 to 2007.

== Awards ==
- State Award in Translation, 1982, for translating Milton's Paradise Lost into Arabic
- Order of Sciences and Arts, 1st Class, 1984.
- Ben Turki's Award of Excellence in Translation into English, a Saudi Arabian Prize sponsored by the Arab League, 1998.
- State Award of Excellence in Letters, 1999.
- Award of Credit for distinguished performance in writing for the theatre from the Egyptian Theatre Institute, 2000.
- State Award of Merit in Letters, 2002.
- International Translation Award of King Abdullah, 2011.
- ALESCO Prize for translation into English, Baghdad, 2013.
- Rifa’ah Al-Tahtawi Prize for Translation into Arabic, National Translation Centre, 2014.

== Books ==
=== Books written in Arabic ===
==== Scholarly works on translation and literary criticism ====
- Analytical Criticism, 1963, 1992.
- The Art of Comedy, 1980.
- Literary Genres, 1984, 1992, 2001, 2010.
- On Drama and Poetry, 1986.
- The Art of Translation, 1993, 1994, 1996, 1997, 1999, 2001, 2004, 2008.
- On Life and Art, 1993.
- Contemporary Currents in Western Culture, 1994.
- Issues in Modern Literature, 1995.
- Modern Literary Terms, 1996, 1997, 2002, 2004.
- Literary Translation : Theory and Practice, 1997, 2002.
- The Translator's Guide, 2000, 2004.
- Modern Translation Theory, 2003.
- Dictionary of English Abbreviations and Acronyms, Longmans, 2014.
- On Translating Shakespeare (in English) forthcoming.
- Arabization and Translation of terms in the Human Sciences (forthcoming).
- Egypt in the 19th C. English Verse (forthcoming).

==== Creative works ====
- Al-Barr al-Gharbi (The Western Bank of the Nile) presented in 1964, published in 1985.
- Meet Halawah, a play published in 1979 and presented in 1982. Second edition 1994.
- The Prisoner and the Jailor, published in 1980, 1984, presented in 1998 (four One-act plays).
- Al-Magazib (The Idiots) a play presented in 1983 and published in 1985.
- Al-Ghirban (The Crows) a play in verse published in 1987 and presented in 1988.
- A Spy in the Sultan's Palace, a play in verse published in 1991 and presented at the National Theatre 1992.
- The Dervish and the Dancer, published in 1994, presented in 2000.
- The Journey of Enlightenment, a documentary play, co-authored with Samir Sarhan, presented in 1991, published in 1992.
- Laylat al-Zahab (The Night of Gold) four one-act plays published in 1993.
- Halawat Yunis (Yunis Candy) four one-act plays published in 1993.
- The Master Rabble, a play published in 1993.
- Echoes of Silence, a volume of verse, 1997.
- Oases in a life-time, an autobiography, 1998.
- Oases in a foreign land, the autobiography continued, 1999.
- Egyptian Oases, third part of the autobiography, 2000.
- The Nymph of Atlas, a volume of verse, 2001.
- Tales from the Oases, an autobiographical supplement, 2002.
- The Green Island, a novel, 2003.
- A Life Ring, a volume of verse, 2004.
- The Tale of Mi'zah, a narrative poem, 2004.
- "Job's Wife", a narrative poem, 2004.
- Faust, an Arabic verse version, 2013.
- Voices and Echoes, a volume of verse, forthcoming.
- plus two Arabic plays adapted for the theatre but never published.

==== Translations into Arabic ====
- The White Man's Dilemma, 1961.
- An Invitation to Learning, 1962.
- Dryden on Dramatic Poesy, 1963.
- Chekhov's Uncle Vania, 1964 (with Samir Sarhan, put on the stage 1964).
- Ionesco's Rhinoceros, 1963 (with Samir Sarhan, put on the stage 1963).
- Shakespeare's A mid-summer Night's Dream, published in 1964 (Theatre Magazine) - a prose translation.
- Shakespeare's Romeo and Juliet, published in 1965 (Theatre Magazine) - a prose translation.
- Three Contemporary British Plays, 1982, 1994.
- Milton's Paradise Lost, part I, 1981.
- Milton's Paradise Lost, part II, 1986.
- Romeo and Juliet, adapted as a musical, presented in 1985 and published in 1986.
- Shakespeare's The Merchant of Venice, 1988, 2001, 2010.
- Alex Healey's A Different Kind of Christmas, 1989.
- Shakespeare's Julius Caesar, 1991.
- Shakespeare's A Mid-summer Night's Dream, 1992, in verse and prose.
- Romeo and Juliet, the full verse translation, 1993, 2009.
- Shakespeare's Henry VIII, 1996.
- Shakespeare's King Lear, fully in verse, 1996, 2009.
- K. Armstrong's Biography of Prophet Muhammad, 1998 (with Fatmah Nasr).
- K. Armstrong's Jerusalem, 1998 (with Fatma Nasr).
- Shakespeare's Richard II, 1998.
- K. Armstrong's The Battle for God, 2000 (with Fatma Nasr).
- W. Wordsworth, a Selection, translated in verse, 2002.
- Lord Byron's Don Juan, 2003.
- Shakespeare's The Tempest, 2004.
- Shakespeare's Sonnets, 2016
- Shakespeare's Hamlet, 2004. (verse)
- Shakespeare's Othello, 2005. (verse)
- E. Said's Covering Islam, 2005.
- Shakespeare's Macbeth, 2005. (verse)
- E. Said's Representations of the Intellectual, 2006.
- E. Said's Orientalism, 2006, 2nd. ed (2008).
- Shakespeare, Twelfth Night, 2007.
- Shakespeare, Antony and Cleopatra, 2007.
- Shakespeare, Richard the Third, 2007.
- J. Milton, Paradise Regained, 2008.
- H. Pinter, Ten Selected Short Plays, 2008.
- Shakespeare, The Merry Wives of Windsor, 2008.
- Shakespeare, Much Ado About Nothing, 2009.
- Shakespeare, All's Well That Ends Well, 2009.
- H. Pinter, The Longer Plays, in 2 vols., 2010.
- Shakespeare's As You Like it, GEBO, 2010.
- Shakespeare's Troylus and Cressida, GEBO, 2010.
- Shakespeare's The Winter's Tale, GEBO, 2011.
- Rudyard Kipling, Kim, National Translation Centre, 2011.
- Shakespeare, Coriolanus, GEBO, 2012.
- Eggers, D. Zeitun, Dar El-Shorouq, 2012.
- R.L. Stevenson, Dr. Jekyll and Mr. Hyde, Dar El-Shorouq, 2012.
- Shakespeare, Measure for Measure, GEBO, 2013.
- Goethe, Faust, 2013.
- Shakespeare's Pericles, 2014.
- Shakespeare's The Taming of the Shrew, 2014.

=== Books written in English ===
==== Scholarly works on literary criticism and translation ====
- Dialectic of Memory: A Study of Wordsworth's Little Prelude, Cairo 1981, State Publishing House (GEBO).
- Lyrical Ballads 1798 ed with an introduction, Cairo, GEBO, 1985.
- Varieties of Irony: an Essay on Modern English Poetry, Cairo, GEBO, 1985, 2nd ed. 1994.
- Naguib Mahfouz Nobel 1988: (ed.) a Collection of critical essays (Cairo, GEBO, 1989).
- Prefaces to Arabic Literature: (The post-Mahfouz era) with a miniature anthology of modern Arabic Poetry since the 1970s by M.S. Farid, Cairo, GEBO, 1994.
- The Comparative Tone: Essays in Comparative Literature, with a Bibliography of Arabic Literature in Translation by M.S. Farid, GEBO, 1995.
- Comparative Moments : Essays in Comparative Literature and an Anthology of Post-modernist Arabic poetry in Egypt, with appendices by M.S. Farid, GEBO, 1996.
- On Translating Arabic, A Cultural Approach, GEBO, 2000.
- The Comparative Impulse, with M.S. El-Komi & M.S. Farid, GEBO, 2001.
- On Translating Shakespeare, GEBO, forthcoming.

==== Translations into English ====
- Marxism and Islam (by Mostafa Mahmoud), Cairo, Dar Al-Maaref, 1977 (reprinted several times, the last in 1984).
- Night Traveller (a verse play by Salah Abdul-Saboor) with an introduction By S. Sarhan, Cairo, GEBO, 1979, 2nd ed. Cairo, 1994.
- The Quran: an attempt at a modern reading (by Mostafa Mahmoud) Cairo, 1985.
- The Music of Ancient Egypt (by M. Al-Hifni) Cairo, 1985 Belgrade, MPH, 1985. 2nd ed. Cairo (in the Press).
- The Trial of an Unknown Man (a verse play by Izz El-Din Ismail) Cairo, GEBO 1985.
- Modern Arabic Poetry in Egypt an anthology with an introduction Cairo, GEBO, 1986, 2002.
- The Fall of Cordova (a volume of verse by Farooq Guwaidah) Cairo, GEBO, 1989.
- The Language of Lovers' Blood (a volume of verse by Farooq Shooshah) Cairo GEBO, 1991.
- Time to Catch Time (a volume of verse by Farooq Shooshah) Cairo, GEBO, 1996.
- A Thousand Faces has the Moon (a volume of verse by Farooq Guwaidah) Cairo, GEBO, 1997.
- Shrouded by the Branches of Night (a volume of verse by M. Al-Faytoure) Cairo, GEBO, 1997.
- Leila and the Madman (Laila wal-Majnoun) (a play in verse by Salah Abdul-Saboor) Cairo, 1998.
- An Ebony Face (a volume of verse by Farooq Shooshah), Cairo, GEBO, 2000.
- Time in the Wilderness (a volume of epigrams by Habiba Mahammadi) Cairo, GEBO, 2001.
- On the Name of Egypt (a long poem by Salah Jaheen) Cairo, GEBO, 2002.
- Short Stories (Mona Ragab) with A. Gafary, Cairo, GEBO, 2002.
- Modernist and Postmodernist Arabic Poetry in Egypt (a selection with an introduction) Cairo, GEBO, 2002.
- Beauty Bathing in the River (a volume of verse by Farooq Shooshah), Cairo, GEBO, 2003.
- Songs of Guilt and Innocence (Poems by Mahammad Adam), Cairo, GEBO, 2004.
- Angry Voices, an anthology of the off-beat poetry of the 1990s in Egypt, with an introduction, : Arkansas Univ. Press, US, 2003.
- Salah Abdul-Sabour: The Complete Plays, ed. GEBO, 2014.
