= Lovers of Life =

- عشاق الحياة
- Directed by: Helmy Halim
- Written by: Farouk al-Qadi (story); Yousry Hakim (scenario and dialogue)
- Produced by: Muharram Fouad
- Starring: Muharram Fouad; Nadia Lutfi; Youssef Wahbi; Mahmoud el-Meliguy; Habiba; Hassan Mustafa
- Cinematography: Wahid Farid
- Edited by: Nadia Shoukry
- Music by: Abdel Aziz Halim (score); Mohamed El-Mougy; Mounir Mourad; Muharram Fouad (songs
- Production company: Nile Sound Films
- Distributed by: General Egyptian Cinema Organization
- Release date: November 15, 1971
- Running time: 106 minutes
- Country: Egypt
- Language: Arabic

Lovers of Life (Arabic: عشاق الحياة, transliterated as Oushaq el-hayah) is an Egyptian musical drama film released on November 15, 1971. The film is directed by Helmy Halim, features a screenplay by Farouk al-Qadi, and stars Muharram Fouad and Nadia Lutfi. The plot is about a Pasha who adopts a young boy, but when the boy proposes to the Pasha's daughter, she refuses and sparks a family crisis.

== Cast ==
- Muharram Fouad (Ahmed Salem)
- Nadia Lutfi (Mona Ismail al-Jabali)
- Youssef Wahbi (Ismail Pasha al-Jabali)
- Habiba (Zizi Murad)
- Mahmoud el-Meliguy (Seifullah Zadeh)
- Momtaz Abazah (Ismat bin Seifullah Zadeh)
- Hassan Mustafa (Salama, leader of the performing troupe)
- Ibrahim Qadri (Sheikh Saleh al-Awwad)
- Ali Mustafa (Arian, son of Sheikh Saleh)
- Abdel Ghani Nagdi
- Qadreya Kamel
- Hamdy Youssef
- Rashwan Mostafa
- Samir Abdel Azim
- Saleh al-Iskandarani

== Songs ==
All the lyrics to the songs are by Morsi Gameel Aziz.

Songs in score
Title	Composer
"مساء التماسي يا قمر" ("Good Evening, Moon")	Muharram Fouad
"غريب يا ليل الغريب" ("Strange, Strange Night")	Mounir Mourad
"ندم" ("Regret")	Mohamed El-Mougy
"والنبي لنكيد العزال" ("And the Prophet Ends Alone")	Mohamed El-Mougy

== Synopsis ==
When Salem Khouli dies, a local Pasha named Ismail al-Jabali (Youssef Wahbi) adopts the late man's 15-year-old son, Ahmed bin Salem (Muharram Fouad), and raises the boy with his only daughter Mona (Nadia Lutfi). Noticing Ahmed's musical inclinations, the Pasha sends him to a four-year study course at a conservatory in Italy. Ahmed conceals his love for Mona out of concern for the wealth gap, while Mona silently pines for him and waits in vain for hints of more than brotherly love in the letters he sends her during his studies. Ahmed returns from abroad and finds Mona waiting at the port with Sheikh Saleh al-Awwad (Ibrahim Qadri) and his son Arian (Ali Mustafa), who used to sing with the adoptive siblings over the Mawlid holiday. Mona becomes jealous shortly after their reunion, as she watches Ahmed rub elbows with Zizi Murad (Habiba), lead singer of a performance group Ahmed is working with that is run by his friend Salama (Hassan Mustafa). Ahmed pledges to ask the Pasha for Mona's hand after the success of his first show.

Meanwhile, however, the prospective couple encounter disreputable characters in the person of Seifullah Zadeh (Mahmoud el-Meliguy) and his son Ismat (Momtaz Abazah), both compulsive horse racing gamblers and prodigious con men of aristocratic families and wealthy heiresses. Seifullah claims to be descended from the Pasha's Tuganoglu relatives and tries to foist a purebred filly named Aziza onto the Pasha. While the Pasha declines the horse, he does invite Seifullah and Ismat to stay a week at the estate. Seifullah hatches a plot to seize the Pasha's wealth by the marriage of Ismat to Mona and sets out to separate her from Ahmed to that end.

Ahmed and his new group are a success, and he proposes to Mona. The Pasha refuses his offer and throws him out of the house, then pressures Mona to renounce Ahmed. Feeling betrayed by Mona, Ahmed turns to drink. Zizi takes advantage of the chance to seduce Ahmed and disavows the loving Salama. Relieved to be free of their burdens, the two fall in love. Saifullah asks for Mona's marriage to Esmat, and the Pasha presents the family jewels as the dowry. Sheikh Saleh asks Ahmed to perform at the wedding, and after performing he hurries for his taxi. Mona tries to chase him and is paralyzed in an accident in the process. Ahmed proposes to Zizi and the banns of marriage are published in the newspaper, depressing Mona. Saifullah and Ismat scheme to kill the Pasha and take over Mona's wealth, and they wait for him to come back from asking for Ahmed's return to shoot him.

The Pasha, Saleh, and Arian all go to meet Ahmed, who expels the Pasha from the theater without a word. Saleh, however, tells Ahmed of the Pasha's sorrow and Mona's injury, so he comes out only to see Saifullah's shot. Ahmed chases Saifullah and Ismt and apprehends them for arrest, then offers to donate blood to the Pasha at the hospital, saving his life. The Pasha agrees to allow Mona to marry Ahmed, who rushes to Mona's side to apologize.

== Production ==
The success of the movie My Father upon the Tree in 1969 opened the floodgates for major producers and directors to take on serious musical dramas. Therefore, Muharram Fouad jumped at the chance to produce a movie co-starring him with Nadia Lutfi, who was in that film by Fouad's rival singer-actor Abdel Halim Hafez.

Lutfi agreed to film Lovers of Life but was shocked by Fouad's attempt to promote the film as breaking a record in Egyptian cinema by adding two kisses to the already considerable total in My Father upon the Tree. Lutfi refused this and reprimanded Fouad bitterly on a phone call. She threatened to stop filming if he continued advertising it this way, deeming it as harming her reputation as a wife and mother, according to a 1971 feature in the Lebanese entertainment magazine Al Mawed. He stopped the blurbs immediately and sought an alternative campaign more to her taste.
