= 5th Moscow International Film Festival =

1967 film festival

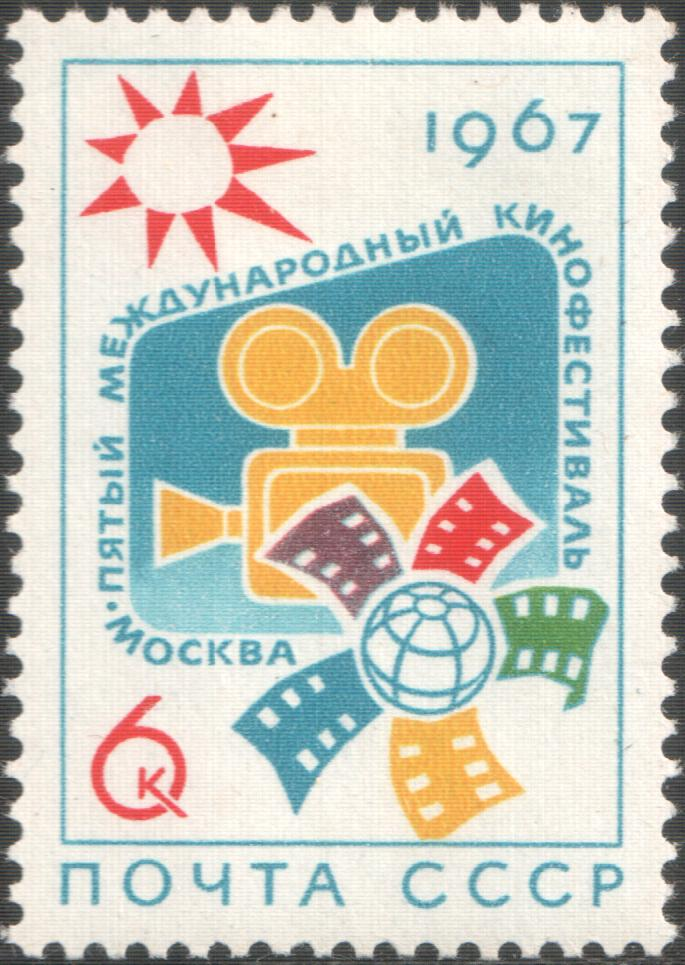
- International Film Festival Emblem (1967)
- Location: Moscow, Soviet Union
- Founded: 1959
- Awards: Grand Prix
- Festival date: 5–20 July 1967
- Website: http://www.moscowfilmfestival.ru

The 5th Moscow International Film Festival was held from 5 to 20 July 1967. The Grand Prix was shared between the Soviet film The Journalist, directed by Sergei Gerasimov and the Hungarian film Father, directed by István Szabó. The festival line-up included the film Spellbound Wood, directed by Norodom Sihanouk, the former King of Cambodia.

== Jury ==
- Sergei Yutkevich (USSR - President of the Jury)
- Román Viñoly Barreto (Argentina)
- Aleksey Batalov (USSR)
- Lucyna Winnicka (Poland)
- Todor Dinov (Bulgaria)
- Hagamasa Kawakita (Japan)
- Leslie Caron (France)
- András Kovács (Hungary)
- Grigori Kozintsev (USSR)
- Robert Hossein (France)
- Jiří Sequens (Czechoslovakia)
- Dimitri Tiomkin (USA)
- Andrew Thorndike (East Germany)
- Leonardo Fioravanti (Italy)

== Films in competition ==
The following films were selected for the main competition:

English title	Original title	Director(s)	Production country
The Great White Tower	Shiroi Kyotō	Satsuo Yamamoto	Japan
No Stars in the Jungle	En la selva no hay estrellas	Armando Robles Godoy	Peru
Up the Down Staircase	Up the Down Staircase	Robert Mulligan	United States
A Faithful Soldier of Pancho Villa	Un dorado de Pancho Villa	Emilio Fernández	Mexico
Westerplatte	Westerplatte	Stanisław Różewicz	Poland
The Winds of the Aures	ريح الاوراس Rih al awras	Mohammed Lakhdar-Hamina	Algeria
The Thief of Paris	Le voleur	Louis Malle	France, Italy
Dacii	Dacii	Sergiu Nicolaescu	Romania, France
Case of the Naves Brothers	O Caso dos Irmãos Naves	Luis Sérgio Person	Brazil
The Wild Eye	L'occhio selvaggio	Paolo Cavara	Italy
The Diary of a Worker	Työmiehen päiväkirja	Risto Jarva	Finland
The Journalist	Zhurnalist	Sergei Gerasimov	Soviet Union
Spellbound Wood	La Forêt Enchantée	Norodom Sihanouk	Cambodia
Love the Magician	El amor brujo	Francisco Rovira Beleta	Spain
Thursday We Shall Sing Like Sunday	Jeudi on chantera comme dimanche	Luc de Heusch	Belgium, France
Flood	Uech	Dejidiin Jigjid	Mongolia
Nguyen Van Troi	Nguyễn Văn Trỗi	Lý Thái Bảo, Bùi Đình Hạc	North Vietnam
The Subterranean	Subteranul	Virgil Calotescu	Romania
Shock Troops	Un homme de trop	Costa-Gavras	France, Italy
Treasure of San Gennaro	Operazione San Gennaro	Dino Risi	Italy, West Germany, France
Dishonored	Dishonored	Igbal Shahzad	Pakistan
Father	Aра	István Szabó	Hungary
Detour	Otklonenie	Grisha Ostrovski, Todor Stoyanov	Bulgaria
The Climber	Štićenik	Vladan Slijepčević	Yugoslovia
The Adventures of Juan Quin Quin	Las aventuras de Juan Quin Quin	Julio García Espinosa	Cuba
The Princess	Prinsessan	Åke Falck	Sweden
The Dawn	الفجر, Al fajr	Omar Khlifi	Tunisia
Romance for Bugle	Romance pro křídlovku	Otakar Vávra	Czechoslovakia
Scandal in the Family	Escándalo en la familia	Julio Porter	Argentina
The Third Vow	Teesri Kasam	Basu Bhattacharya	India
Neighbours	Naboerne	Bent Christensen	Denmark
Khan El Khalili	خان الخليلي Khan El Khalili	Atef Salem	Egypt
Bread and Roses	Brot und Rosen	Heinz Thiel, Horst E. Brandt	East Germany
A Man for All Seasons	A Man for All Seasons	Fred Zinnemann	Great Britain

== Awards ==
- Grand Prix:
  - The Journalist by Sergei Gerasimov
  - Father by István Szabó
- Special Golden Prize: Detour by Grisha Ostrovski and Todor Stoyanov
- Golden Prize: No Stars in the Jungle by Armando Robles Godoy
- Special Silver Prize: Romance for Bugle by Otakar Vávra
- Silver Prizes:
  - Westerplatte by Stanisław Różewicz
  - Treasure of San Gennaro by Dino Risi
  - The Great White Tower by Satsuo Yamamoto
  - The Climber by Vladan Slijepčević
- Prizes:
  - Best Actor: Paul Scofield for A Man for All Seasons
  - Best Actress: Sandy Dennis for Up the Down Staircase
  - Best Actress: Grynet Molvig for The Princess
- Special Mention: Fred Zinnemann for A Man for All Seasons
- Prix FIPRESCI: Detour by Grisha Ostrovski and Todor Stoyanov
