= Sanaa Gamil =

Egyptian actress (1930–2002)

OSA Sanaa Gamil
- سناء جميل
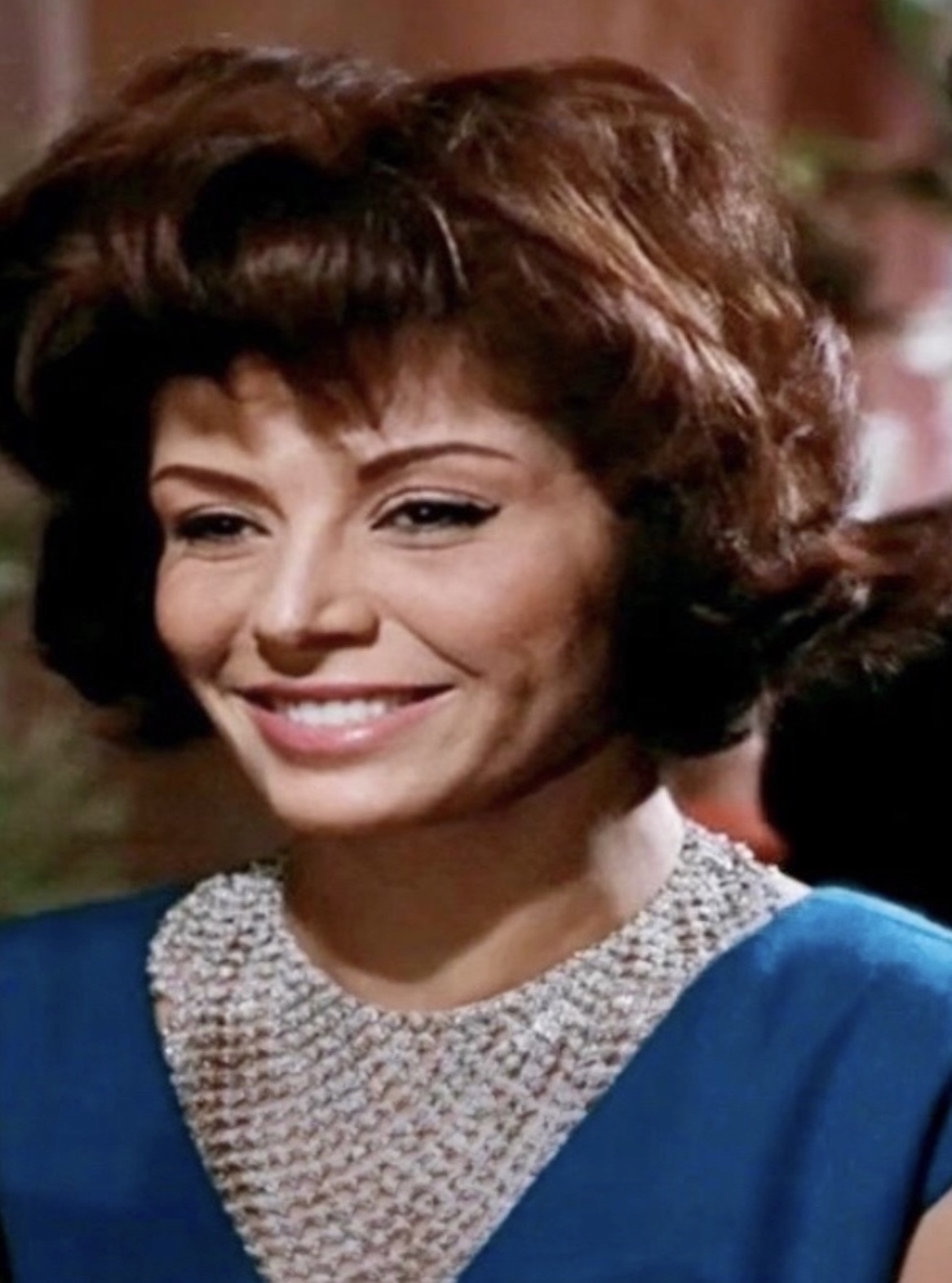
- Sanaa Gamil in 1965
- Born: Soraya Youssef Atallah ثريا يوسف عطالله; April 27, 1930; Minya Governorate, Egypt
- Died: December 22, 2002 (aged 72); Cairo, Egypt
- Occupation: Actress
- Spouse: Louis Greiss
- Honours: Order of Sciences and Arts

Sanaa Gamil (Arabic: سناء جميل), born Soraya Youssef Atallah (Arabic: ثريا يوسف عطالله) (April 27, 1930 – December 22, 2002), was an Egyptian actress. She is one of the most prominent artistic figures in the golden age of Egyptian film industry.

== Early life ==
Born Soraya Youssef Atallah, in Minya Governorate on April 27, 1930. The daughter of an aristocratic family and a graduate of French schools. She was an orphan, thrown out by her elder brother from their home on a cold night for his refusal of allowing his sister to enter the movie business. She endured much before entering the world of professional acting, but was exceptional and endowed with an individual style in performance, regardless of the nature of the characters she personified.

She moved to Cairo to pursue her acting career. In an interview with her, Sanaa spoke about the suffering she experienced, crying, frightened, the day her brother spelled her was the same day that the Cairo Fire occurred. This made this day unforgettable throughout her whole life. She sought refuge with director Zaki Tulaimat, who helped her live in a student hostel and included her in the “Modern Theater” troupe. Tulaimat chose her stage name, Sanaa Gamil. She worked in clothes tailoring, to pay her bills. She used to sleep on the floor for the lack of any amenities where she lived at the time.

== Career ==
Sanaa Gamil started her career on stage, afterwards, she was cast in her early career in minor roles in a couple of successful films, such as Lady of the Train (1952) starring Laila Mourad and directed by Youssef Chahine, Ask My Heart (1952) by Ezz El-Dine Zulficar, A Window Overlooking Paradise (1953) by Ahmed Diaa Eddine, Shame on You (1953) directed by Essa Karama, starring Ismail Yassine, and April’s Fool (1954) by Mohamed Abdel-Gawad. Her real breakthrough came when she was cast for the role of Nefisah opposite Omar Sharif in The Beginning and the End (1960) directed by Salah Abouseif. The film was based on a novel with the same name by the Nobel Prize winner Naguib Mahfouz. Sanaa Gamil won the best supporting actress award at the Moscow Film Festival in 1961 for her role in this movie.

After her breakthrough in 1960, she starred in a number of highly successful productions such as: The Impossible (1965) by Hussein Kamal, The Second Wife (1967) by Salah Abu Seif, The Message (1976), The Unknown (1984), La Dame du Caire (1992), Edhak El Soora Tetla Helwa (1998) directed by Sherif Arafa. She had four of her films voted for by Cairo International Film Festival critics and featured among "the 100 best ever made Egyptian films in the 20th century" list back in the centenary of the Egyptian Cinema, 1996.

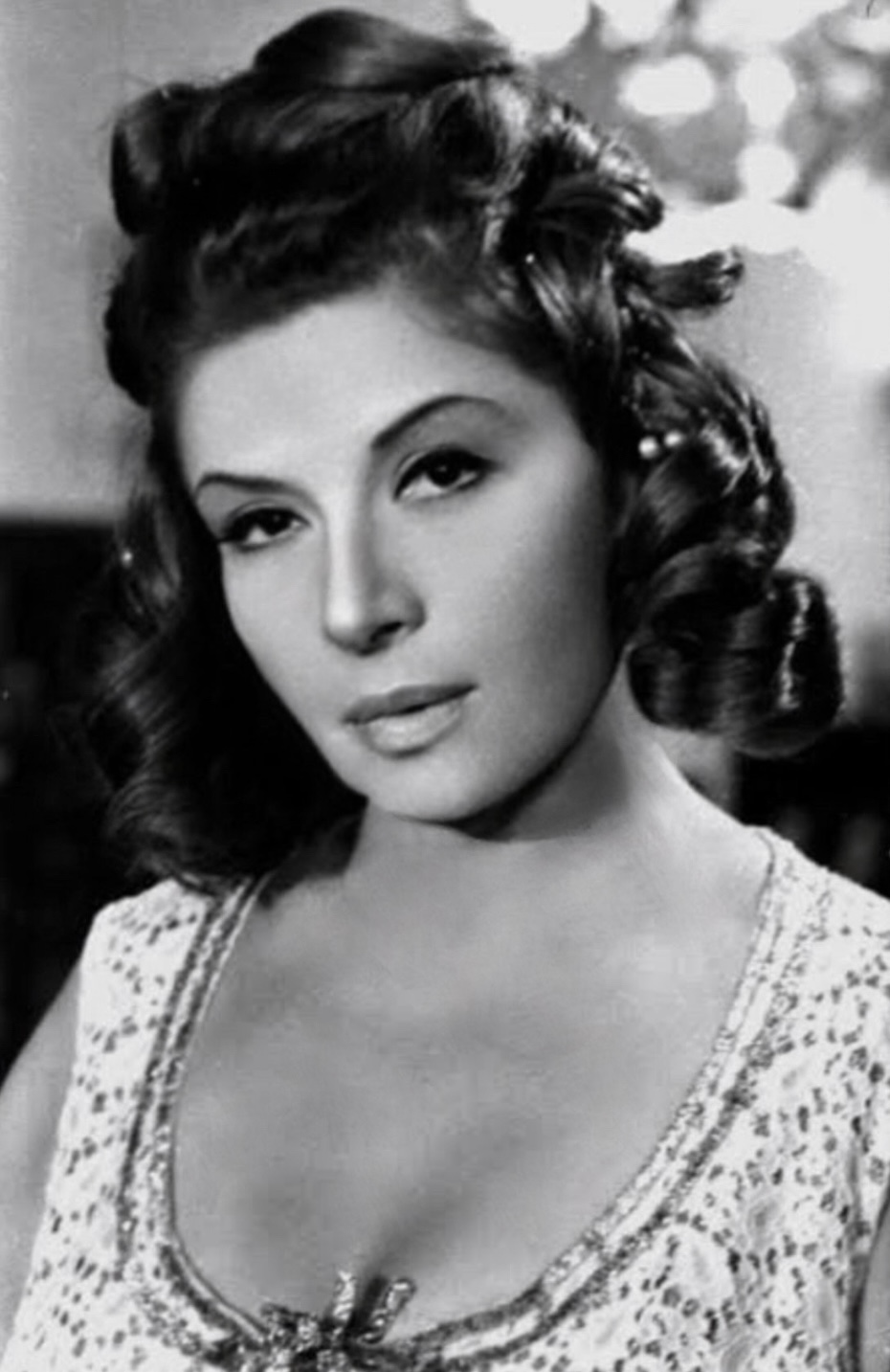
Sanaa Gamil in 1968

Not only a film actress, but more importantly a highly respected theater actress, one of the best Egyptian theater actresses. She played a number of roles on the French Stage for the Comédie-Française. In Egypt, her notable theatrical roles include; The Cactus Flower (1967), Carte Blanch (1970), and Cabaret (1974), and in a number of plays in the 1980s such as The Visit (El-Zeyara) with Gamil Ratib. Gamil acted in a number of television series such as Ta'er EL Bahr (Sea Bird) opposite Salah Zulfikar in 1972 and Oyoun (Eyes) opposite Fouad el-Mohandes in 1980. In 1988, she had another career peak with The White Flag (El Raya El-Bayda), a powerful social drama miniseries where she played the role of Fadda El Maadawi, an illiterate rich woman.

Sanaa Gamil received Order of Sciences and Arts from President Gamal Abdel Nasser in 1969, and received another one from President Anwar Sadat in 1976. In 2016 the Egyptian director Rogina Bassaly, made a documentary film about her, It's "Sana's Tale" ("حكاية سناء").

== Personal life ==
Sanaa Gamil was married to the renowned Egyptian journalist Louis Greiss. She met him in 1960, at a farewell party for a Sudanese journalist who had completed her training at Rose al-Yūsuf. She kept getting his name wrong throughout the party and calling him Youssef. Louis Greiss was attached to her, but he thought that their marriage was impossible, as he believed that she was a Muslim because of her frequent saying, “By the Prophet.” He even thought about declaring his conversion to Islam in order to marry her. Afterwards, he discovered that she was a Christian, so he proposed to her, and they married with two rings whose price did not exceed 10 Egyptian pounds.

Greiss told about the day of their marriage on Sunday, that the priest refused to complete the marriage without the presence of guests and witnesses, so he went to the newspaper Rose al-Yūsuf, where he worked, and rented 7 vehicles in which he gathered 35 of his colleagues to resolve the crisis. They spent their honeymoon moving between several governorates due to Sanaa’s connection to the number From theatrical performances. The love story and marriage of Sanaa and Louis was one of the most famous and beautiful love stories that surpasses romantic novels. Gamil would always swear by his name, saying, “With the life of Louis.” The loving husband responded to her desire not to have children and devote herself to art, and each of them was the focus of the other’s life.

== Death ==
She was transferred to intensive care in an hospital in the Mohandessin district, suffering from complete heart muscle weakness, failure of the right lung function. She was originally suffering from cancer. She died at the age of 72 on December 22, 2002.

== Honours ==
Country	Honour	Year
Egypt	Order of Sciences and Arts	1969
Egypt	Order of Sciences and Arts	1976

== Selected filmography ==
=== Film ===
- Ana Bint Nas (1950)
- Adam and Eve (1951)
- Lady of the Train (1952)
- The Big Clown (1952)
- Zeinab (1952)
- My life partner (1953)
- Abid el mal (1953)
- Ana bint min? (1953)
- A Window Overlooking Paradise (1953)
- April's Fool (1954)
- People of Love (1955)
- The Beginning and the End (1960)
- Dawn of a New Day (1965) …. Naila
- The Impossible (1965)
- The Second Wife (1967) .... Wife
- The Message (1976)
- Hekmatak ya rab (1976) .... Om Naima
- The Unknown (1984)
- La Dame du Caire (1992)
- El Sayed Kaf (1994)
- Sawaq El Hanem (1994)
- Edhak el soura tetlaa helwa (1998)

=== Television ===
- Sea Bird (1972)
- Eyes (1980)
- The White Flag (1988)
- Saken Osady (1995-96)

== See also ==
- List of Egyptians
- List of Egyptian films of the 1960s
