= I Will Not Confess =

- Directed by: Kamal El Sheikh
- Written by: Zaki Saleh
- Produced by: Helmy Rafla
- Starring: Faten Hamama; Ahmed Mazhar; Ahmed Ramzy
- Cinematography: Abdel Halim Nasr
- Edited by: Hussein Ahmed
- Release date: October 16, 1961
- Running time: 120 minutes
- Country: Egypt
- Language: Arabic

I Will Not Confess (Arabic: لن أعترف, Lan Aataref) is a 1961 Egyptian crime film starring Faten Hamama, Ahmed Mazhar and Ahmed Ramzy. The film is directed by the Egyptian film director Kamal El Sheikh.

== Plot ==
Amal (Faten Hamama) is the wife of Ahmed (Ahmed Mazhar) who manages a textile factory. One day, she receives a threatening letter directed at Ahmed. The letter reveals that Ahmed committed a murder; he killed a teller to steal the factory's money. Amal remembers that her husband had come to her telling her that he had lost his money, and weeks later had restored his money. One of the factory workers (Salah Mansour) meets Amal and confirms what the letter said, claiming that he witnessed the crime.

Amal seeks her brother's (Ahmed Ramzy) support. He goes to the worker and, after a heated and vehement argument, fights with him and eventually kills him. He immediately runs away. Minutes later, Amal reaches the worker's home to talk to him, and finds him dead. She is blamed for the crime. Amal does not tell anybody from her family. Her health conditions worsens and is hospitalized. Amal's brother confesses his crime. Her husband surrenders himself and confesses that he committed the crime saying that he only did all that to secure a better life for his wife.

== Cast ==
- Faten Hamama as Amal
- Ahmed Mazhar as Ahmed
- Ahmed Ramzy as Amal's brother
- Salah Mansour
- Sherifa Maher
- Nazim Shaarawy
