= The Climber (1966 film) =

1966 film

- Directed by: Vladan Slijepčević
- Starring: Ljubiša Samardžić
- Cinematography: Djordje Nikolic
- Release date: 11 July 1966
- Running time: 100 minutes
- Country: Yugoslavia
- Language: Serbian

The Climber (Serbian: Štićenik, Штићеник) is a 1966 Yugoslav drama film directed by Vladan Slijepčević. It was entered into the 5th Moscow International Film Festival where it won a Silver Prize.

== Cast ==
- Ljubiša Samardžić as Ivan Stojanovic
- Špela Rozin as Bozica
- Stanislava Pesić as Dragana
- Rade Marković as Vojin
- Duša Počkaj as Kaca Radak
- Ljubinka Bobić as Gazdarica
- Jovisa Vojinović as Gazda Sveta
- Mihajlo Kostić Pljaka as Janketa
- Dragomir 'Gidra' Bojanić as Jakov Stipetic
- Božidar Stošić as Mali
- Predrag Tasovac as Direktor televizije
- Belle Marquez as The Climber 1
- Rosse Celle Marquez as The Climber 2
