= Italian Secret Service =

- Directed by: Luigi Comencini
- Screenplay by: Luigi Comencini; Piero De Bernardi
- Story by: Massimo Patrizi; Leonardo Benvenuti
- Produced by: Angelo Rizzoli
- Starring: Nino Manfredi; Françoise Prévost
- Cinematography: Armando Nannuzzi
- Edited by: Nino Baragli
- Music by: Fiorenzo Carpi
- Release date: 5 February 1968
- Running time: 108 minutes
- Country: Italy
- Language: Italian

Italian Secret Service (also known as Il nostro agente Natalino Tartufato) is a 1968 Italian comedy film directed by Luigi Comencini. For his performance in this film and in Il padre di famiglia, Nino Manfredi was awarded with a Golden Plate at the 1968 Edition of David di Donatello.

== Plot ==
Assassination attempts are constantly bungled.

== Cast ==
- Nino Manfredi as Natalino Tartufato
- Françoise Prévost as Elvira Spallanzani
- Clive Revill as Charles Harrison
- Gastone Moschin as Lawyer Ramirez
- Jean Sobieski as Edward Stevens
- Giampiero Albertini as Ottone
- Alvaro Piccardi as Ciro
- Giorgia Moll as "The Bird"
- Enzo Andronico as Femore
- Attilio Dottesio as Russian agent

== Production ==
The film was shot in the autumn of 1967. It was filmed between Rome and London.

== Reception ==
The film was a major success, grossing over one billion lire at the Italian box office.
