= Khan El Khalili =

1967 film

Khan El Khalili خان الخليلي
- Directed by: Atef Salem
- Starring: Samira Ahmed
- Release date: July 1967
- Running time: 120 minutes
- Country: Egypt
- Language: Arabic

Khan El Khalili (Arabic: خان الخليلي) is a 1967 Egyptian drama film directed by Atef Salem. It was entered into the 5th Moscow International Film Festival. It is based on Naguib Mahfouz’s 1945 novel of the same name.

== Cast ==
- Samira Ahmed (Nawal)
- Imad Hamdi (Ahmed)
- Hassan Youssef (Rushdi)
- Abdel Waress Assar (Walid)
- Hussein al-Meliguy
- Taheyya Kariokka
- Mohamed Reda (Professor Nono)
- Mohammed Tawfik
- Anwar al-Khawan
- Amal Zayed (mother)
- Helmi Hilaly
- Saad Qutb
- Zuhair Sabry
- Abdel Ghani Nagdi
- Hussein Ismail
- Abdelmonem Ismail
- Abdel Moneim Bassioni
- Muhammad Mandour
- Tawfik El Deken
- Abdel Khalek Saleh
- Ali Al Ghandour
- Samia Roshdi
- Abdel Azim Abdel Haq
- Abdel Bader Al Deen
- Atef Makram (child)
- George Sidhom
- Nahed Sabri

== Synopsis ==
Ahmed is forced to interrupt his studies to support his family and help his younger brother Rushdi complete his education. He moves with his family from the El Sakkakini neighborhood of Cairo to the area of the Khan el-Khalili bazaar, where he gets to know the residents, including a professor named Nono who has lived there his entire life. Despite Rushdi’s frivolous life of diversions, he completes his education and becomes Ahmed’s sole accomplishment, albeit vicariously. Ahmed begins looking for love and finds it in their neighbor Nawal, but experiences a rude awakening when she falls for Rushdi. Looking for distraction, Ahmed goes with Nono to live with his ne’er-do-well friend Walid. Rushdi contracts tuberculosis as a result of his disreputable behavior, leaving everyone’s life in shambles.
