= Where Do You Hide the Sun? =

1980 Egyptian film

Ayna Tukhabi'un al-Shams?/Where Do You Hide the Sun?
- Directed by: Abdellah Mesbahi
- Produced by: Ahmad al-Quraysh; General Foundation for Cinema
- Starring: Nadia Lutfi; Nour El Sherif; Adel Adham
- Cinematography: William Iskandar
- Release date: 1980
- Country: Egypt
- Language: Arabic

Where Do You Hide the Sun? (Arabic:Ayna Tukhabi'un al-Shams?) is a 1980 Egyptian film that addresses the effects of corruption on young people with the solution being adhering to social values. The film stars Nadia Lutfi, Nour El Sherif, Adel Adham and the cast includes Egyptians, Libyans and Moroccans.

== Cast ==
- Nadia Lutfi
- Nour El Sherif
- Adel Adham
- Abdelhadi Belkhayat
- Abd al-Wahab al-Dukali
- Layla Hamadah
- Mushirah Isma'il
- Ali Ahmad Salim
