= People of Love =

- أهل الهوى
- Directed by: El-Sayed Ziada
- Written by: El-Sayed Ziada
- Produced by: El-Sayed Ziada
- Starring: Taheyya Kariokka; Shoukry Sarhan; Mahmoud el-Meliguy; Fouad Shafiq; Mahmoud Shokoko; Stephan Rosti
- Cinematography: Masoud Issa
- Edited by: Ahmed Ismail
- Music by: Ibrahim Hussein Darwish (score); Fathi Qura (lyrics); Attia Sharara and Al-Nour Ensemble led by Abdel Fattah Mansi (dance music); Galal Sadiq and Doria Ahmed (singers)
- Distributed by: Modern Egyptian Films (Hussein Sedki
- Release date: May 23, 1955
- Running time: 115 minutes
- Country: Egypt
- Language: Arabic

People of Love (Arabic: أهل الهوى, transliterated as Hawa al-Ahl) is an Egyptian film released on May 23, 1955. The film is directed and written by El-Sayed Ziada and stars Taheyya Kariokka, Shoukry Sarhan, Mahmoud el-Meliguy, Fouad Shafiq, and Mahmoud Shokoko. The movie was released on Eid al-Fitr.

== Cast ==
- Taheyya Kariokka (Fitna/Batta)
- Shoukry Sarhan (film star, essentially as himself)
- Mahmoud el-Meliguy (Baraka, Fitna's brother and manager)
- Fouad Shafiq (Kamel Abu Dahab, a grandee)
- Mahmoud Shokoko (monologist sharing the actor's name)
- Stephan Rosti (Akram Abu Shama, a wealthy Lebanese man)
- Abdel Moneim Ibrahim (Baazaq, Fitna's brother)
- Kamel el-Zeiny (doctor, hospital director)
- Sanaa Gamil (Zoba, the maid)
- Mohamed el-Sabaa (Farid, Akram Abu Shama's relative)
- Mohamed Reda (Lebanese goalkeeper)
- Hristo Kladakis (dance coach)
- Shosho Ezzedine (dancer)
- Eileen Diato (dancer)
- Galal Sadiq (singer)
- Abbas Helmy (film director)
- Anwar Zaki
- Mahmoud al-Rashidi
- Ahmed Abdelfattah
- Nihad Nader
- Shawqi Azzouz
- Ahmed Hussein
- Hassan al-Sayeh
- Ali Orabi

== Songs ==
Songs in score
Title	Lyricist	Composer	Singer
“على باب الحارة استناني” (“Waiting at the Gates of the Neighborhood”)	Fathi Qura	Ibrahim Hussein Darwish	Doria Ahmed (playback singer accompanied by Taheyya Kariokka dancing
“كحيل العين” (“Kahil al-Ain”)	Fathi Qura	Ibrahim Hussein	Galal Sadiq

== Synopsis ==
The playful raqiya dancing girl Fitna (Taheyya Kariokka) uses the wealthy Kamel Abu Dahab (Fouad Shafiq) for expensive favors, while her ne’er-do-well brother Baraka (Mahmoud el-Meliguy) does the same to Kamel's sister while he boards in Abu Dahab's palace as Fitna's manager. Baraka has an affair with Kamel's young maid, Zoba (Sanaa Gamil). Fitna suffers from abdominal pain and needs surgery but fears it. She travels on business to dance in Lebanon alone because Baraka cannot obtain a passport, and there she meets the wealthy Akram Abu Shama (Stephan Rosti), who welcomes her to his mountain estate and showers her with gifts and a marriage proposal. Fitna agrees to marry him to secretly pursue his nephew Farid (Mohamed el-Sabaa).

A film star (Shoukry Sarhan) and a monologist (Mahmoud Shokoko, both more or less playing themselves) decide to form a theatrical troupe funded by Kamel Abu Dahab with Fitna as chief dancer and offer Baraka the director position to try and get her and Kamel on board. The newspapers publicize the marriage, shocking Kamel, but Baraka convinces him that Fitna and Akram may get divorced. Baraka and his wife are out on a walk and spot a convincing lookalike of Fitna named Batta, who looks more spirited and speaks without a lisp, so they hire the woman to take her doppelganger's place with the added incentive of working with Shoukry and taking on her brother Baazaq (Abdel Moneim Ibrahim) as her business manager in Lebanon. Kamel has a surgeon (Kamel el-Zeiny) secretly operate on Fitna's abdomen, but he operates on Batta instead and finds no issue. Batta and Shoukry fall in love as they film a movie together, but when Fitna returns from Lebanon to get the surgery, Baraka refuses to send her to the same hospital, while Akram sees Kamel and Batta together in the newspapers after completing the movie and thinks Fitna has betrayed him. A furious Akram travels to Cairo to confront Batta, but she and Shoukry tell him the truth and their marriage is blessed. Fitna and Kamel are in attendance at the wedding, but she backs away from him when Akram approaches, right off the balcony where she falls to her death, leaving both Kamel and Akram empty-handed and broken-hearted against the backdrop of Batta and Shoukry's happy ending.
