= Vladan Slijepčević =

Serbian film director

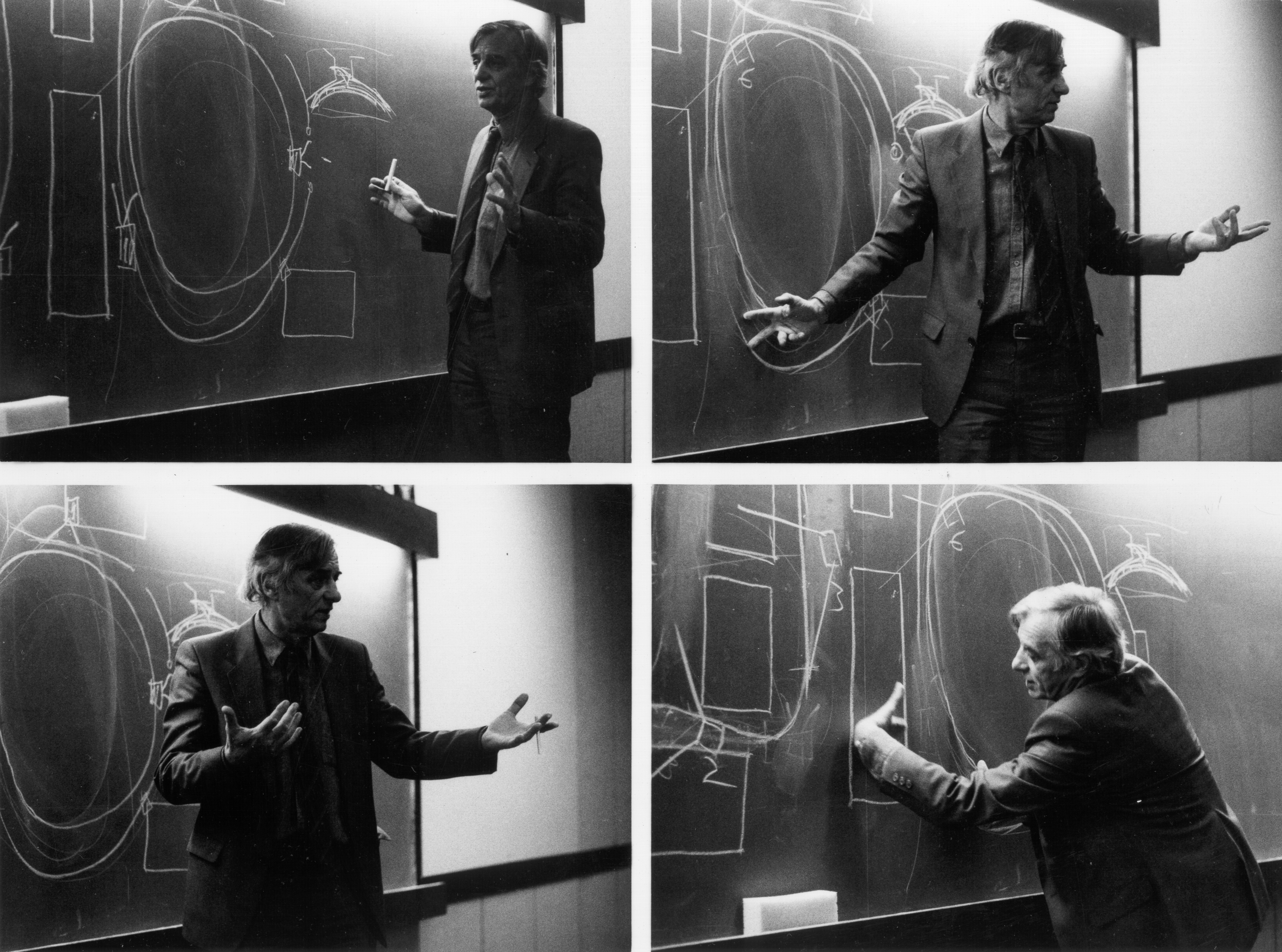
- Born: 30 October 1930; Skopje, Kingdom of Yugoslavia
- Died: 13 September 1989 (aged 58); Belgrade, SR Serbia, SFR Yugoslavia
- Occupations: Film director, screenwriter
- Years active: 1952–1989

Vladan Slijepčević (30 October 1930 – 13 September 1989) was a Serbian and Yugoslavian film director and screenwriter. He directed more than 50 films between 1952 and 1989. His 1966 film The Climber was entered into the 5th Moscow International Film Festival where it won a Silver Prize.

== Selected filmography ==
- Where to After the Rain? (1967)
- The Climber (1966)
- The Real State of Affairs (1964)
- Three-Hearts Locket (1962)
- For Youth (1953)
