= Tamino (musician) =

Belgian-Egyptian singer

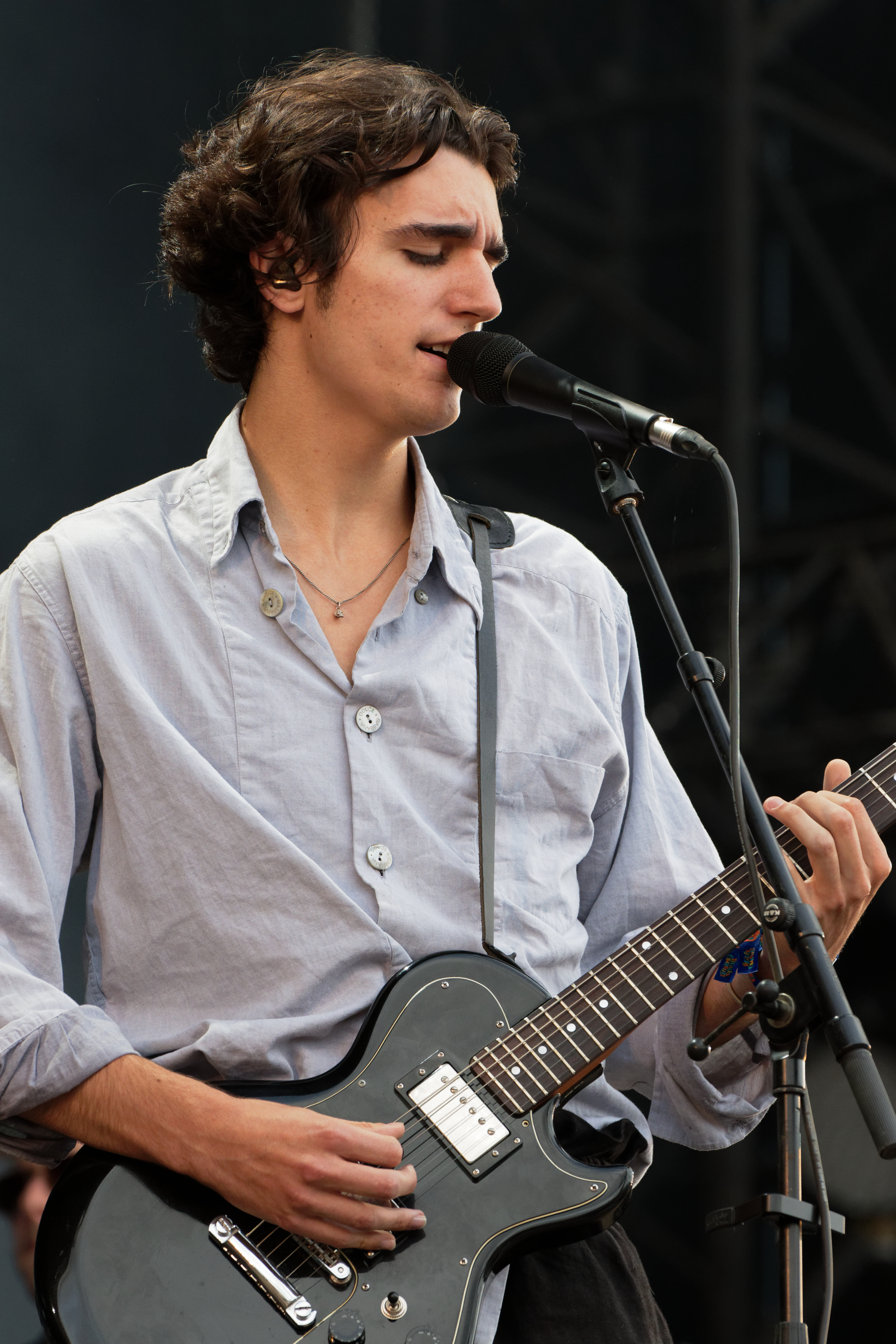
- Tamino in 2019

Background information
- Born: Tamino-Amir Tarek Moharam Fouad; 24 October 1996 (age 29); Mortsel, Antwerp, Belgium
- Genres: Indie rock; alternative rock
- Years active: 2016–present
- Labels: Communion Music, Arts & Crafts Productions
- Website: taminomusic.com
- influenced by: Thom Yorke, Jeff Buckley

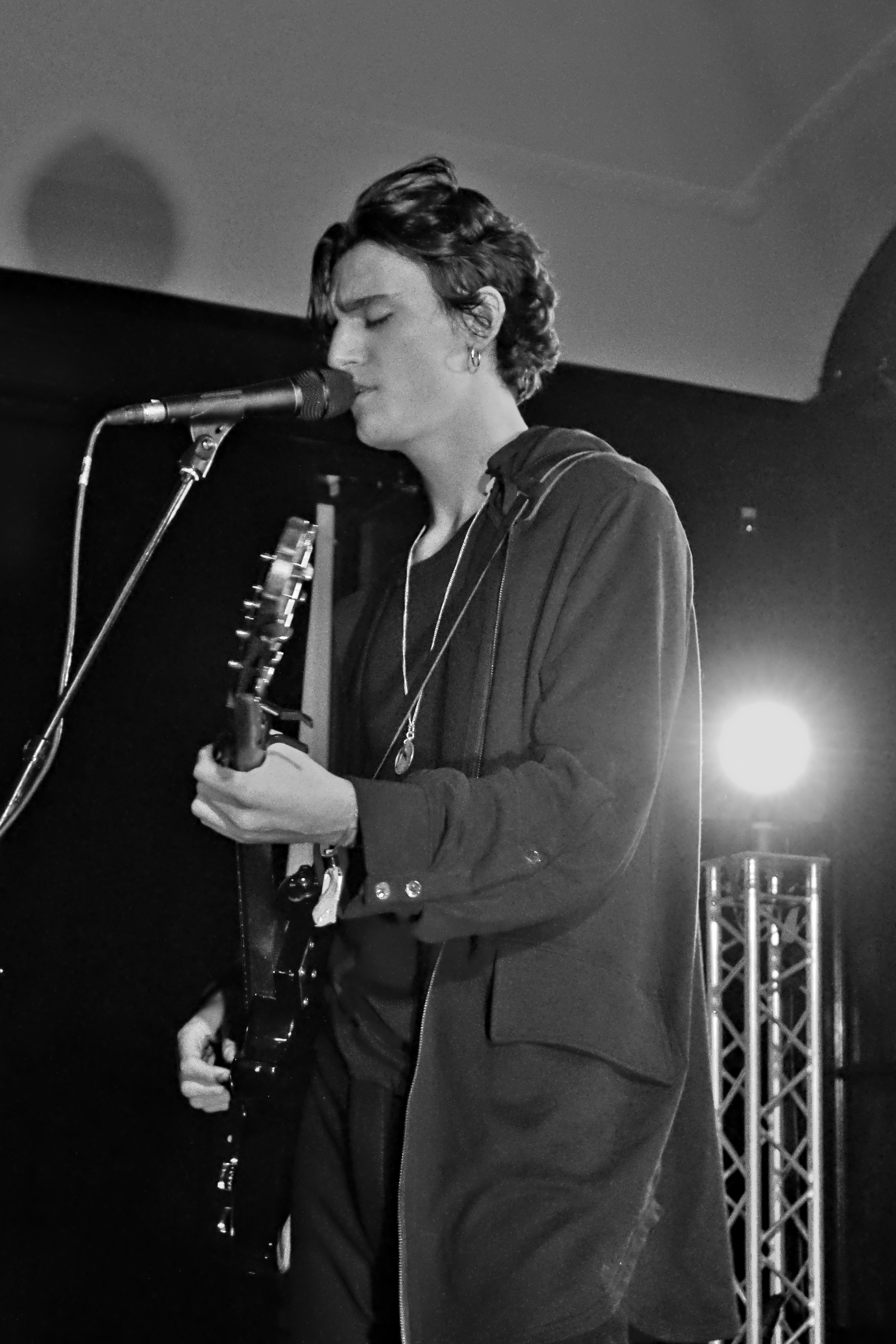
Tamino at Waves Vienna 2018

Tamino-Amir Tarek Moharam Fouad (born 24 October 1996), known mononymously as Tamino, is a Belgian-Egyptian singer, musician and model. He is the grandson of Egyptian singer and movie star Muharram Fouad.

== Early life ==
Tamino-Amir Moharam Fouad was born on 24 October 1996 in Mortsel, Antwerp, Belgium, to a Belgian (Flemish) mother and Egyptian father. His parents met in the 1990s in Guinea, where his mother was living as an anthropology student. The couple settled in Belgium, where his mother gave birth to him and his brother Ramy. His parents split when he was 3 years old and his father returned to Egypt. Tamino was raised by his mother and Belgian grandparents.

His paternal grandfather was the famous Egyptian singer Muharram Fouad. Tamino played the piano as a child, and was musically influenced by his mother, who introduced him to artists such as The Beatles, Erik Satie, Frédéric Chopin, as well as the Arabic music he got to know through his father.

== Career ==
Before reaching commercial success, at age 17 Tamino trained vocally at the Amsterdam Conservatory.

In November 2016, Tamino was invited by Belgian band Het Zesde Metaal to play a Radio 1 session. His first single, Habibi, made an impression and he was immediately picked up by Radio 1.

In 2017, Tamino won a new musical talent competition at Studio Brussels. On 11 October 2017 he played in the Ancienne Belgique (Brussels) where he was nicknamed 'the Belgian Jeff Buckley'. He has also played at Palais 12 (Brussels) and during the Flemish Music Industry Awards and the Melkweg in Amsterdam. During the summer of 2017, he was featured in festivals across Belgium and the Netherlands such as Rock Werchter and Pukkelpop.

In the summer of 2018 Tamino performed in festivals across Europe including Rock en Seine (Paris).

=== Amir ===
On 19 October 2018 Tamino released his first full-length album, Amir (Arts & Crafts/Communion). On the album, Tamino is joined by a collective of Arabic musicians based in Brussels called Nagham Zikrayat, an orchestra predominantly made up of professional musicians from the Middle East, most of whom are refugees that fled Iraq and Syria.

At the end of October, he played three sold-out shows at the Ancienne Belgique as part of a European headline tour. On 8 November 2018 he performed in Iceland at Iceland Airwaves.

The BBC hailed Amir as "The New Sound of The Nile", an ode to Tamino's grandfather Muharram Fouad. The Independent included Amir in their top 10 albums of 2018. Tamino won the Anchor Award at Germany's 2018 Reeperbahn festival and has been nominated for 5 MIA Awards in Belgium.

Tamino was featured in Live Nation's Ones To Watch, which spoke of Tamino's voice, saying his "falsetto surpasses 'face melting' and rises to a space of pureness that can only be described as divine."

In 2019, Tamino played four shows at SXSW, his first North American shows, where he shared the live version of his single "Indigo Night", with Radiohead bassist Colin Greenwood. On 10 May, Tamino released his live EP titled Live at Ancienne Belgique. Following SXSW he returned to Europe for a tour across the continent, including France, Great Britain, Germany, and the Sziget Festival in Budapest. He announced his first headline stadium show in November 2019 at the Lotto Arena.

Tamino has also been featured in the fashion world and alongside supermodel Gisele Bündchen in Missoni's SS19 Collection. During Paris Fashion week he was featured "in conversation" with Maison Valentino and performed a solo version of "Indigo Night". He has been featured in Vogue Hommes' March 2019 14-page spread, which was photographed by critically lauded photographer Paolo Roversi.

=== Sahar ===
On 27 April 2022, Tamino released "The First Disciple" after a two-year social media hiatus, the first single from his second studio album, Sahar. On 7 June 2022, Tamino released his second single from the album, "Fascination," and announced that Sahar would be released 23 September 2022.

On 6 June 2022, Tamino announced that he would resume his postponed 2020 North America and Europe tour in September 2022.

=== Every Dawn's a Mountain ===
On 15 October 2024, Tamino released "Babylon", the first single from his upcoming album titled Every Dawn's a Mountain. In the months proceeding, he released the singles "Dissolve", "Sanctuary" (written and performed in collaboration with American singer-songwriter Mitski, whom he had been touring alongside for her "The Land Is Inhospitable and So Are We" tour throughout early 2024) and "Willow".

The full album was released on March 21, 2025, and a tour of North America and Europe was announced.

== Discography ==
=== Studio albums ===
List of studio albums, with selected chart positions, sales and certifications
Title	Details	Peak chart positions				
Title	Details	BEL (FL)	BEL (WA)	NLD	FRA	SWI
Amir	Released: 19 October 2018; Label: Communion Music, Arts & Crafts Productions	1	33	41	73	64
Sahar	Released: 23 September 2022; Label: Communion Music, Arts & Crafts Productions	1	12	34	36	56
Every Dawn's a Mountain	Released: 21 March 2025; Label: Communion Music	2	4	19	102	—
"—" denotes a recording that did not chart or was not released in that country.

=== EPs ===
- Tamino
  - Released 5 May 2017
- Habibi
  - Released 4 May 2018
- Live at Ancienne Belgique
  - Released 10 May 2019

=== Singles ===
Year	Title
2017	"Habibi"
2017	"Cigar"
2017	"Indigo Night"
2018	"Tummy"
2019	"Indigo Night (live)"
2019	"Crocodile"
2022	"The First Disciple"
2022	"Fascination"
2022	"You Don't Own Me"
2022	"Sunflower (featuring Angèle)"
2024	"Babylon"
2024	"Dissolve"
2025	"Sanctuary (featuring Mitski)"
2025	"Willow"
