= The Boss (1958 film) =

- المعلمة
- Directed by: Hassan Reda
- Written by: El Sayed Bedeir
- Produced by: Taheyya Kariokka
- Starring: Taheyya Kariokka; Yehia Chahine; Omar el-Hariri; Mahmoud el-Meliguy
- Cinematography: Wahid Farid
- Music by: Fouad el-Zahery
- Release date: December 8, 1958
- Country: Egypt
- Language: Arabic

The Boss (Arabic: المعلمة, transliterated El-mo’allema) is an Egyptian film released in 1958. The film’s story is based on the tragedy Othello by William Shakespeare.

== Synopsis ==
El-Moall’em Abbas (Yehia Chahine), owner of the al-Atara shop in the Ghouria neighborhood of Cairo, is imprisoned after he quarrels with a group of neighbors. He had recently married Touha (Taheyya Kariokka), but did not realize that a man named Hafez (Mahmoud el-Meliguy) also pines for her. Hafez tries to take advantage of Abbas’s absence to approach Touha, but is unsuccessful.

Abbas is released to great fanfare, but Hafez sows doubts about Touha’s fidelity, deluding Abbas into believing she has had an affair with Fathi (Omar el-Hariri), a perfumer. Madbouly (Mohammed Tawfik), a drug addict under Abbas’ thrall, turns traitor and helps Hafez by telling Touha that Abbas frequents a brothel. Touha encounters Abbas in the brothel, and after their quarrel, he divorces her.

Madbouly collapses from a drug overdose and his carried by Touha to her home to nurse him back to health. Touched by her kindness, he informs Touha of Hafez’s role in the events. Abbas finds Madbouly at his house and thinks Touha is cheating with him, strangling her and thinking he has killed her. When Madbouly tells him Abbas Touha was faithful, Abbas and Madbouly join forces to seek revenge on Hafez in a climax in which Abbas attacks Hafez and his minions and Madbouly kills Hafez.

== Production ==
The film is notable as the only film produced by famed raqs sharqi dancer and actress Taheyya Kariokka, who financed it by selling a diamond ring.
