= Muharram Fouad =

Egyption singer, actor (1934–2002)

Moharam Fouad محرم فؤاد
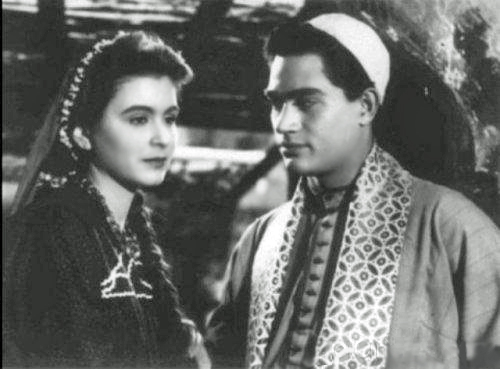
- Fouad (right) in Hassan and Naeima, with Souad Hosni

Background information
- Born: Moharam Hussien Ahmed Ali; 24 June 1934; Cairo, Egypt
- Died: 27 June 2002 (aged 68) Cairo, Egypt
- Genres: Egyptian music; romantic
- Occupations: Singer; actor
- Spouse: Mouna Hilal

Moharam Fouad (Arabic: محرم فؤاد; 24 June 1934 – 27 June 2002), was an Egyptian singer and actor.

== Biography ==
Fouad was born on 24 June 1934 in Cairo, Egypt. He had four brothers and four sisters.

Fouad's introduction to the screen came in 1959 with the film Hassan and Nayima, an Egyptian love story with Soad Hosny.

Throughout his lifetime, Fouad sang well over 900 songs, 20 of them in praise of Palestine.

He later suffered heart complications and had to go to Europe to be treated. Complications with his kidneys also caused continuous problems. He died on 27 June 2002.

== Personal life ==
He started singing from the age of four when he was chosen from his school to sing solo in front of King Farouk. He had several marriages but only one son, Tarek. His grandson is the Belgian-Egyptian singer Tamino.

== Filmography ==
- Hassan and Nayima – Hassan and Naeima
- Min Gheer Meaad – Without Arrangement
- Hekayet Gharam – Love Story
- Shabab Tayesh – A Reckless Youth
- Ushaq al-Haya – Lovers of Life
- Salasel Min Harir – Chains of Silk
- Wolidtou Min Gadid – Born Anew
- Lahn al-Sada – Tune of Happiness
- Al Siba wal Jamal – The Youth & Beauty
- Nisf Azraa – Half Virgin
- Ettab – Admonition
- Wadaan Ya Hob – Farewell to Love
- El Malika wa Ana – The Queen & I
