= The Impossible (1965 film) =

1965 film

- Directed by: Hussein Kamal
- Starring: Nadia Lutfi; Kamal el-Shennawi
- Release date: 1965
- Country: Egypt
- Language: Arabic

The Impossible (Arabic: المستحيل, translit. El Mustahil) is a 1965 Egyptian drama film starring Nadia Lutfi and directed by Hussein Kamal. The film was selected as the Egyptian entry for the Best Foreign Language Film at the 38th Academy Awards but was not accepted as a nominee. The Impossible is a member of the Top 100 Egyptian films list.

== Cast ==
- Nadia Lutfi
- Kamal el-Shennawi
- Salah Mansour
- Sanaa Gamil

== See also ==
- List of Egyptian films of the 1960s
- List of submissions to the 38th Academy Awards for Best Foreign Language Film
- List of Egyptian submissions for the Academy Award for Best Foreign Language Film
