= Order of Sciences and Arts (Egypt) =

Award of Egypt

- The Order (Grand Cordon)
- Type: Order
- Awarded for: Valuable services to Egypt.
- Country: Egypt
- Presented by: President of Egypt
- Established: 1953

Precedence
- Next (higher): Order of the Republic

The Order of Sciences and Arts (Arabic, وسام العلوم والفنون) is an Egyptian Presidential decoration.

== History ==
The order was established in accordance with Law No. 528 of 1953, which was amended by Law No. 12 of 1972. It is awarded to those who have provided excellent services in the fields of science, art and knowledge. The medal has three degrees.

== Degrees ==
The order is composed of the following classes of merit:

- First class - Grand Cordon
- Second class
- Third class

Post-nominals: The use of post-nominal (OSA) is authorized for this order.

== Wearing ==
The Order is a five-pointed star of white enamel separated by gilded rays, in the middle of which is a gold disc showing "Science and the Arts" in Arabic above a blue enamel and surrounded by gilded circles with Islamic scriptures. The star is fixed over another silver gilded one. The Medal is hanged by a gilded clip in the shape of a painting palette and brushes with light rays emanating from it.

The First Class of the Order shall be hanged around the neck with a silk red-violet ribbon, surrounded by two crimson welts and other two blue ones.

The Second Class of the Order shall be hanged on a red-viloet sash surrounded by two crimson welts and other two blue ones, or as a breast star with other Orders of Precedence for official engagements. As for military recipients for the Second and Third Classes of the order, they shall be hanged on the left side of the chest with the mentioned ribbon. However, the Second-Class Medal is embellished with a Rosette (l'étiquette française).

== Notable recipients ==
- Sameera Moussa
- Gazbia Sirry
- Khairy Shalaby
- Mostafa al-Feki
- Salah Zulfikar
- Magda
- Mounira El Mahdeya
- Sanaa Gamil
- Samiha Ayoub
- Ahmed Mounib
- Mahmoud Yassin
- Nadia Lutfi
- Yusry El-Gendi
- Faten Hamama
- Ezz El-Dine Zulficar
- Yehia Chahine
- Shadia
- Rushdy Abaza
- Hassan Youssef
- Ezzat El Alaili
- Ahmed Fouad Negm
- Abdelhay Adib
- Salah Mansour
- Mohamed Enani
- Mahmud Ali al-Banna
- Lotfy El Tanbouli
- Mohammad Bin Abdulkarim Al-Issa

(*) Foreigners who were granted by a presidential order

== See also ==
- Orders, decorations, and medals of Egypt

== References and sources ==
- World Medals Index, Republic of Egypt: Order of the Republic

Specific
