= The Leech (1956 film) =

1956 film

- Directed by: Salah Abu Seif; Amin Yousseff Ghurab
- Written by: Salah Abu Seif; Amin Yousseff Ghurab; Sayid Bidir
- Produced by: Wahid Farid; Ramses Naguib
- Starring: Taheyya Kariokka; Shoukry Sarhan; Shadia
- Cinematography: Wahid Farid
- Release date: 9 January 1956
- Running time: 126 minutes
- Country: Egypt
- Language: Arabic

The Leech (Arabic: Shabab emraa, also known as A Woman's Youth) is a 1956 Egyptian drama film directed by Salah Abu Seif. It was entered into the 1956 Cannes Film Festival.

== Synopsis ==
The film revolves around Imam Biltagy Hassanein Shoukry Sarhan), a young man who comes from the countryside to study in Cairo. In the Al-Khalifa neighborhood, he rents a house from a woman named Shafaat (Taheyya Kariokka). Seduced by her, he indulges in vice and falls behind on his studies. On the other hand, a young woman close to him who has known him since childhood helps out of the spiral. The latter woman's father advises Biltagy to stay away from her, so he fights to break out of Shafaat's clutches.

== Cast ==
- Taheyya Kariokka (Shafaat)
- Shoukry Sarhan (Imam Biltagy Hussein)
- Shadia (Salwa)
- Abdel Warress Asser (Uncle Hasbo)
- Seraj Munir (Ismail al-Sharnouby
- Ferdoos Mohammed (Imam's mother)
- Mary Ezz el-Din (Mrs. Sharnouby)
- Soleiman el-Gendy (Fathi)
- Abbas el-Daly
- Abdel Moneim Bassioni (police officer)
