= Alvaro Piccardi =

Italian actor (1941–2025)

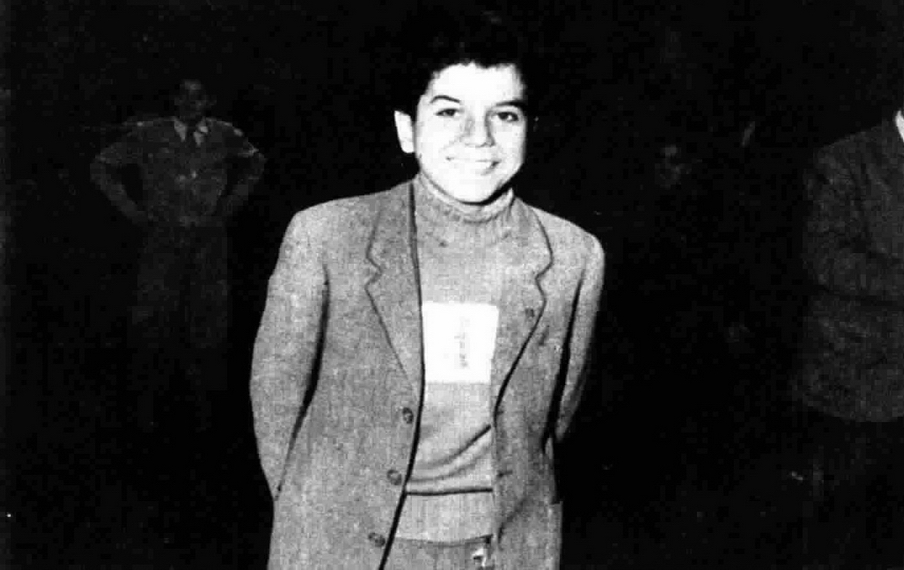
Piccardi in 1954

Alvaro Piccardi (3 June 1941 – 18 August 2025) was an Italian actor and director.

== Life and career ==
Piccardi was born in Ponte San Pietro on 3 June 1941. Throughout his career, he has appeared in a number of television dramas, including the 1959 adaptation of Treasure Island, directed by Anton Giulio Majano, in which he portrayed Jim Hawkins. In 1968, he starred in the feature film Italian Secret Service. He was also a prominent voice actor and is credited in Radici (The New Generations) and Villa Bianca.

He was primarily a theatre actor, being a member of the Gruppo della Rocca company from 1969 to 1980. He was also a teacher and director at the Q Academy - Nuova Accademia Internazionale d'Arte Drammatica in Rome.

Alvaro Piccardi died on 18 August 2025, at the age of 84.
