= Mother of the Bride (1963 film) =

1963 Egyptian comedy film by Atef Salem

- Directed by: Atef Salem
- Written by: Abdel Hamid Gouda
- Produced by: Naguib Khoury
- Starring: Taheyya Kariokka; Imad Hamdi
- Cinematography: Masud Isa
- Release date: 1963
- Running time: 102 minutes
- Country: Egypt
- Language: Arabic

Mother of the Bride (Arabic: أم العروسة, translit. Omm el aroussa) is a 1963 Egyptian comedy film directed by Atef Salem, starring Taheya Cariocca and Imad Hamdi. The film was selected as the Egyptian entry for the Best Foreign Language Film at the 37th Academy Awards, but was not accepted as a nominee. The film was remade in Turkish as Yedi Evlat İki Damat in 1973.

== Plot ==
Zeinab and Hussein are the hard-working parents of a family in Cairo. One day, their daughter announces that she is getting married. When Zeinab and Hussein meet the groom's parents, the latter make a series of over-the-top demands for the wedding.

== Cast ==
- Taheya Cariocca as Zeinab
- Imad Hamdi as Hussein
- Yousuf Shaaban as Jalal
- Hassan Youssef as Shafiq
- Madiha Salem as Nabila

== See also ==
- List of submissions to the 37th Academy Awards for Best Foreign Language Film
- List of Egyptian submissions for the Academy Award for Best Foreign Language Film
