= Todor Stoyanov =

Bulgarian film director

- Born: 6 July 1930; Sofia, Bulgaria
- Died: 30 April 1999 (aged 68); Sofia, Bulgaria
- Occupations: Film director, cinematographer
- Years active: 1960-1990

Todor Stoyanov (Bulgarian: Тодор Стоянов) (6 July 1930 – 30 April 1999) was a Bulgarian film director and cinematographer. He directed ten films between 1967 and 1990. His 1967 film Detour was entered into the 5th Moscow International Film Festival where it won the Special Golden Prize and the Prix FIPRESCI.

== Selected filmography ==
- The Peach Thief (1964)
- Detour (1967)
