= Detour (1967 film) =

1967 film

- Directed by: Grisha Ostrovski; Todor Stoyanov
- Written by: Blaga Dimitrova
- Produced by: Hristo Karaneshev
- Starring: Nevena Kokanova
- Cinematography: Todor Stoyanov
- Edited by: Veselina Gesheva; Luyba Petrova
- Music by: Milcho Leviev
- Distributed by: Brandon Films
- Release date: 26 May 1967
- Running time: 78 minutes
- Country: Bulgaria
- Language: Bulgarian

Detour (Bulgarian: Отклонение; transliteration: Otklonenie), is a 1967 Bulgarian drama film directed by Grisha Ostrovski and Todor Stoyanov. It was entered into the 5th Moscow International Film Festival where it won the Special Golden Prize and the Prix FIPRESCI.

== Cast ==
- Nevena Kokanova as Neda
- Ivan Andonov as Boyan
- Katya Paskaleva as Vera
- Stefan Ilyev as Kosta
- Dorotea Toncheva as Pavlina
- Tzvetana Galabova as Lili at the museum
- Lyuben Zhelyazkov as Friend at the café
- Dora Markova as Peasant woman with peaches
- Svetoslav Peev as Assistant
- Dimitar Lalov as Stuttering man
- Nikolai Ouzounov as Yacho
- Nencho Yovchev as Varadin
