= Grisha Ostrovski =

Bulgarian film director

- Born: 25 May 1918; Paris, France
- Died: 30 April 2007 (aged 88); Sofia, Bulgaria
- Occupation: Film director
- Years active: 1967-1979

Grisha Ostrovski (Bulgarian: Гриша Островски, 25 May 1918 – 30 April 2007) was a Bulgarian film director. He directed seven films between 1967 and 1979. His 1967 film Detour was entered into the 5th Moscow International Film Festival where it won the Special Golden Prize and the Prix FIPRESCI.

== Selected filmography ==
- Detour (1967)
- Men on a Business Trip (1969)
- The Five from the Moby Dick (1970)
