= Nabila Ebeid =

Egyptian actress (born 1945)

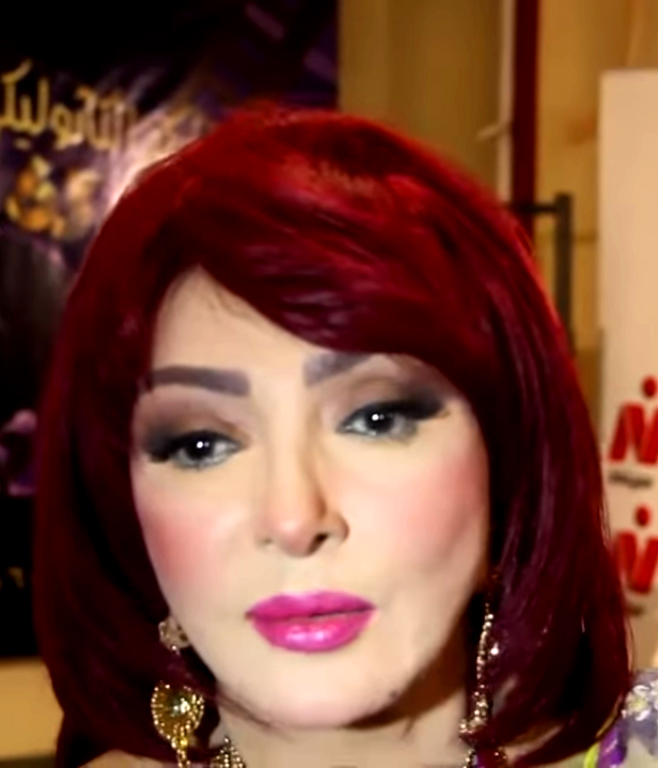
- Born: 21 January 1945 (age 81); Cairo, Egypt
- Occupation: Actress
- Years active: 1961–present
- Spouse: Atef Salem (m. 1963; div. 1967)
- Children: no children

Nabila Ebeid (Arabic: نبيلة عبيد; born 21 January 1945 in Cairo, Egypt), is an Egyptian actress.

== Early life ==
Born in the district of Shubra, Cairo, Nabila was a huge fan of classic Egyptian movies. She used to gather money as a child to go to the Shoubrah Cinema Palace. Nabila Ebeid's roots trace back to Beni Suef Governorate in Upper Egypt.

== Career ==
She was first introduced to Egyptian Cinema by the Egyptian film director Atef Salem in a movie called Mafish Faida. In 1965 she starred with Omar Sharif in The Mamelukes, a role which was described as her "first steps to fame".

In 1967 she co-starred with Salah Zulfikar in the highly successful political play Rubabikia, one of her few roles on stage. She has also starred in the television dramas El-Ammah Nour (Aunt Nour) and El-Bawaba El-Taniya (The Second Gate).

== Personal life ==
She was married to film director who discovered her, Atef Salem, from 1963 to 1967. Obeid later had several secret marriages, including one to Osama El-Baz which lasted for nine years.

== Filmography ==
=== Films ===
- Mafeesh Tafahom (1961)
- Rabia al-Adawiya (1963)
- Zawja Min Paris (1964)
- Al-Mamalik (The Mamluks, 1965)
- Khateeb Mama (Mama's Fiancé, 1965)
- Thalath Losoos (Three Thieves, 1966)
- Al-Asdiqa' Al-Thalatha (The Three Friends, 1966)
- Knooz (Treasures, 1966)
- El-Tartour (1966)
- El-Nassabeen El-Thalatha (The Three Swindlers, 1968)
- Sareq El-Malayeen (The Millionaire Thief, 1968)
- El-Circ (The Circus, 1968)
- Abtal wa Nisaa (Heroes and Women, 1968)
- Zawga Ghayoura Geddan (A Very Jealous Wife, 1969)
- Ibn Africa (The Son of Africa, 1970)
- El-Kaddabin El-Thalatha (The Three Liars, 1970)
- Rehlat Shahr El-Asal (Honeymoon Trip, 1970)
- El-Sa'at El-Raheeba (The Terrible Hours, 1970)
- Haribat Min El-Hob (Escaping from Love, 1970)
- Wahed Fil Million (One in a Million, 1971)
- Adam wa El-Nisaa (Adam and Women, 1971)
- Lastu Mostahtera (I'm Not Reckless, 1971)
- Hayah Khatera (A Dangerous Life, 1971)
- Leabet Kol Youm (A Daily Game, 1972)
- El-Khatafeen (The Kidnappers, 1972)
- El-Hasnaa wa El-Nimr (The Beauty and the Tiger, 1972)
- Laylet Hob Akheera (The Last Night of Love, 1972)
- Sowar Mamnooa (Forbidden Pictures, 1972)
- Shabab Fi Mehna (Young People in Trouble, 1972)
- Gonoon El-Moraheqat (Teenage Madness, 1972)
- Shelet El-Mohtaleen (The Gang of Swindlers, 1973)
- Zekra Laylat Hubb (Memory of a Night of Love, 1973)
- Mesk wa Anbar (Musk and Amber, 1973)
- Rehlat El-Agaeb (Journey of Wonders, 1974)
- Wakan El-Hob (And There Was Love, 1974)
- Hobbi El-Awal wa El-Akheer (My First and Last Love, 1975)
- Magnaneen Bel-Weratha (Crazy by Inheritance, 1975)
- Badia Masabni (1975)
- El-Karawan Loh Shafayef (Truth Has a Voice, 1976)
- Harami El-Hob (Love Thief, 1977)
- Serri Geddan (Top Secret, 1977)
- Wa Saqatt Fi Bahr El-Asal (Falling into the Sea of Honey, 1977)
- El-Omr Lahza (Life Is a Moment, 1978)
- El-Mar'a El-Oukhra (The Other Woman, 1978)
- El-E'teraf El-Akheer (The Last Confession, 1978)
- Rehla Dakhel Emra'a (A Journey Inside a Woman, 1978)
- Wala Yezal El-Tahqiq Mostameran (The Investigation Is Still Ongoing, 1979)
- Da'erat El-Shakk (Circle of Doubt, 1980)
- El-Shareeda (The Outcast, 1980)
- El-Shaytan Yaez (The Devil Preaches, 1981)
- Qahwat El-Mawardi (El-Mawardi Cafe, 1981)
- El-Azraa' wa El-Sha'ar El-Abyad (The Virgin and the White Hair, 1983)
- El-Raqesa wa El-Tabbal (The Dancer and the Drummer, 1984)
- El-Takhshiba (The Prison Cell, 1984)
- Arjook Aatini Haza El-Dawa (Please Give Me This Medicine, 1984)
- Ayam Fi El-Halal (Days of Happiness, 1985)
- El-Sabr Fi El-Malahat (Patience in Salt Pans, 1986)
- El-Hanakish (The Hustlers, 1986)
- Entihar Sahib El-Shaqqa (The Apartment Owner's Suicide, 1986)
- Shader El-Samak (The Fish Market, 1986)
- Abnaa' wa Katala (Sons and Killers, 1987)
- El-Wahl (The Mud, 1987)
- Eghteyal Modarresa (Assassination of a Teacher, 1988)
- El-Tahaddi (The Challenge, 1988)
- Haret Borgwan (Borgwan Lane, 1989)
- El-Raqesa wa El-Siyasi (The Dancer and the Politician, 1990)
- Darb El-Rahba (1990)
- Qadiyet Samiha Badran (The Case of Samiha Badran, 1990)
- Samara El-Amir (1992)
- Deek El-Baraber (Rooster Among Hens, 1992)
- El-Gharqana (The Drowned, 1993)
- Tout Tout (1993)
- Kashef El-Mastour (Revealing the Hidden, 1994)
- Hoda wa Maali El-Wazir (Hoda and His Excellency the Minister, 1994)
- Atabat El-Setat (Ladies' Threshold, 1995)
- El-Mar'a wa El-Sator (Woman and Cleaver, 1997)
- El-Akhar (The Other, 1999)
- Emra'a Taht El-Moraqaba (Woman Under Surveillance, 2000)
- Qasaqis El-Oshaq (Lovers' Scraps, 2003)
- Mafeesh Gher Keda (None But That, 2006)

=== Theater ===
- Rubabikia (Robabekya)

=== Television ===
- El-Ammah Nour (Aunt Nour)
- El-Bawaba El-Taniya (The Second Gate)
