= Nadia Lutfi =

Egyptian actress (1937–2020)

Nadia Lutfi OSA
- نادية لطفي
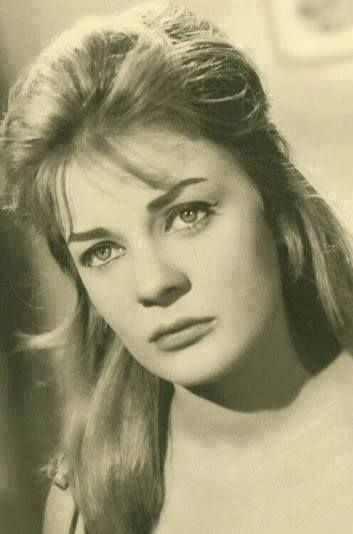
- Born: Paula Mohamed Mostafa Shafik بولا محمد مصطفى شفيق; 3 January 1937; Cairo, Kingdom of Egypt
- Died: 4 February 2020 (aged 83); Cairo, Egypt
- Other name: Nadia Lotfi
- Years active: 1958–1986
- Spouses: Ebrahim Sadek; Mohamed Sabri; Adel Elbeshari
- Children: Ahmad Adel Elbashari
- Honours: Order of Sciences and Arts

Nadia Lutfi or Nadia Lotfi (Arabic: نادية لطفي; born Paula Mohamed Mostafa Shafik (Arabic: بولا محمد مصطفى شفيق); 3 January 1937 – 4 February 2020), was an Egyptian actress. During the apex of her career, she was one of the most popular actresses of Egyptian cinema's golden age.

== Early life ==
Nadia Lutfi was born in Cairo as Paula Mohamed Mostafa Shafiq to an Egyptian family. Her father, Mohamed, and her mother, Fatma Khayri, named her daughter Paula after the name of a kind nun she met in the hospital. The family of Nadia Lutfi was Muslim.

== Career ==
Paula began acting as a hobby; when she was 10 years old she participated in a play at her school and did very well. When the 24-year-old was about to make her screen debut in 1958, Omar Sharif was the reigning king of Egyptian cinema, and his wife, Egyptian superstar Faten Hamama, its queen. The star couple had just had a smash hit with the film La Anam with Hamama as "Nadia Lotfy", a willful teen who destroys her father's marriage. Paula adopted the forename and a variation of the surname of the character as her own.

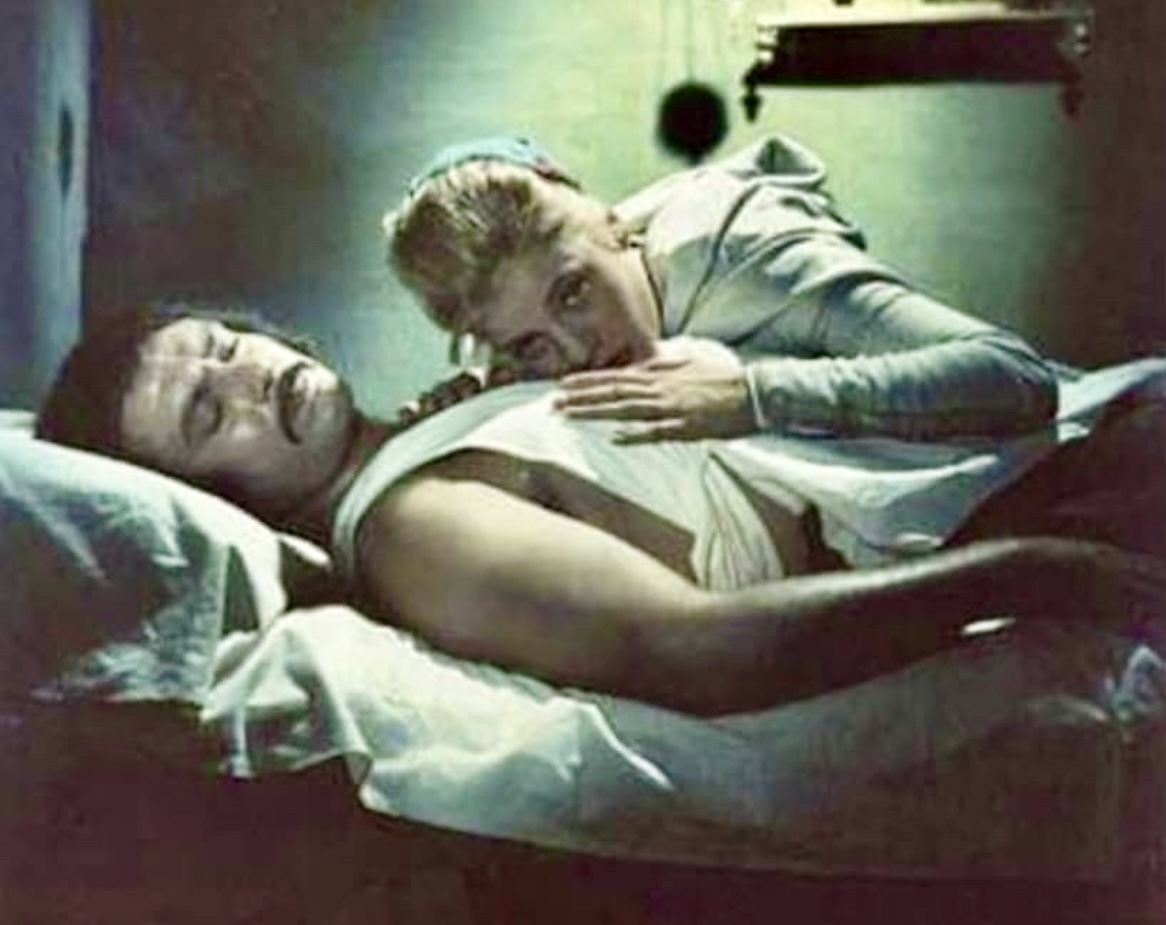
Nadia Lutfi with Salah Zulfikar in Saladin the Victorious (1963)

Under her newly changed name, the young actress was spotted by director Ramses Naguib. Her first film role was in a modest black & white drama, Soultan, in 1958. Her second picture was a smaller role in one of the film landmarks of its time, Cairo Station.

In 1963, she played a Frankish woman warrior of the Crusade era, donning full armor to go into battle against Isa Elawwam her Christian-Arab lover, (role was played by Egyptian bankable star Salah Zulfikar), in El-Nasser Salah Ad-Din (occasionally shown on television in the United States as Saladin and the Great Crusades) (1963). In Lil-Rigal Faqat (For Men Only) (1964) by Mahmoud Zulfikar, Lutfi and co-star Soad Hosny played women geologists who, denied employment, respond by disguising themselves as men and going to work, where they find they must suppress their romantic instincts to sustain the disguise. In the mid-1960s, she starred in two films that were based on stories by Nobel-winning author Naguib Mahfouz, just a few years following the publication of his widely banned novel Awlad Haretna (اولاد حارتنا) which symbolized God and Moses, Jesus and Mohammed, Children of Gebelawi. Lutfi finished the decade starring in Abi foq al-Shagara (My Father Over The Tree) (1969) as a nightclub dancer who beds a much younger man, then discovers that she once knew his father equally well. She also appeared in El Momia (The Night of Counting the Years) in 1969. She starred in several films with Soad Hosny, including Al-Saba' Banat (The Seven Girls).

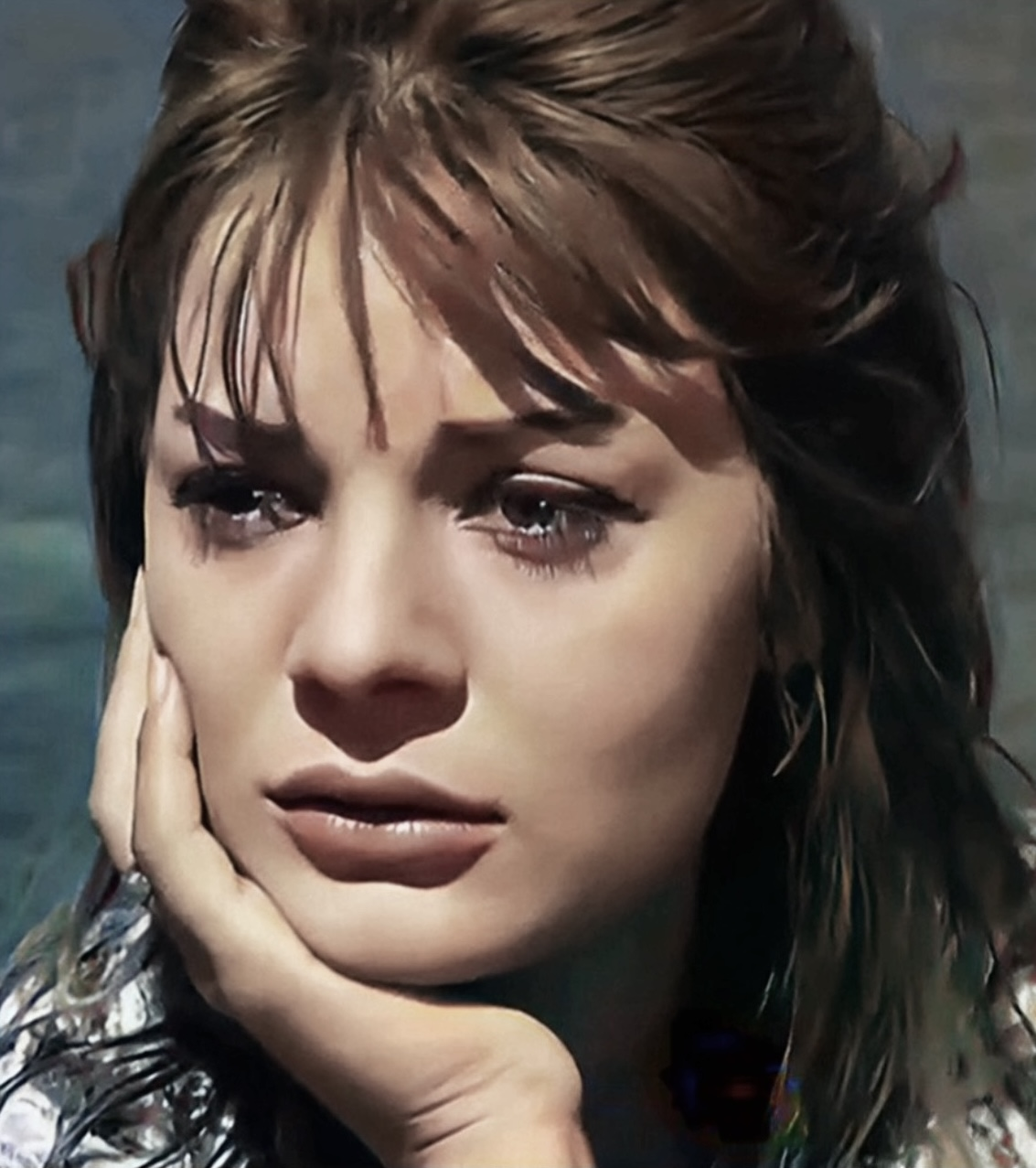
Nadia Lutfi in the 1960s

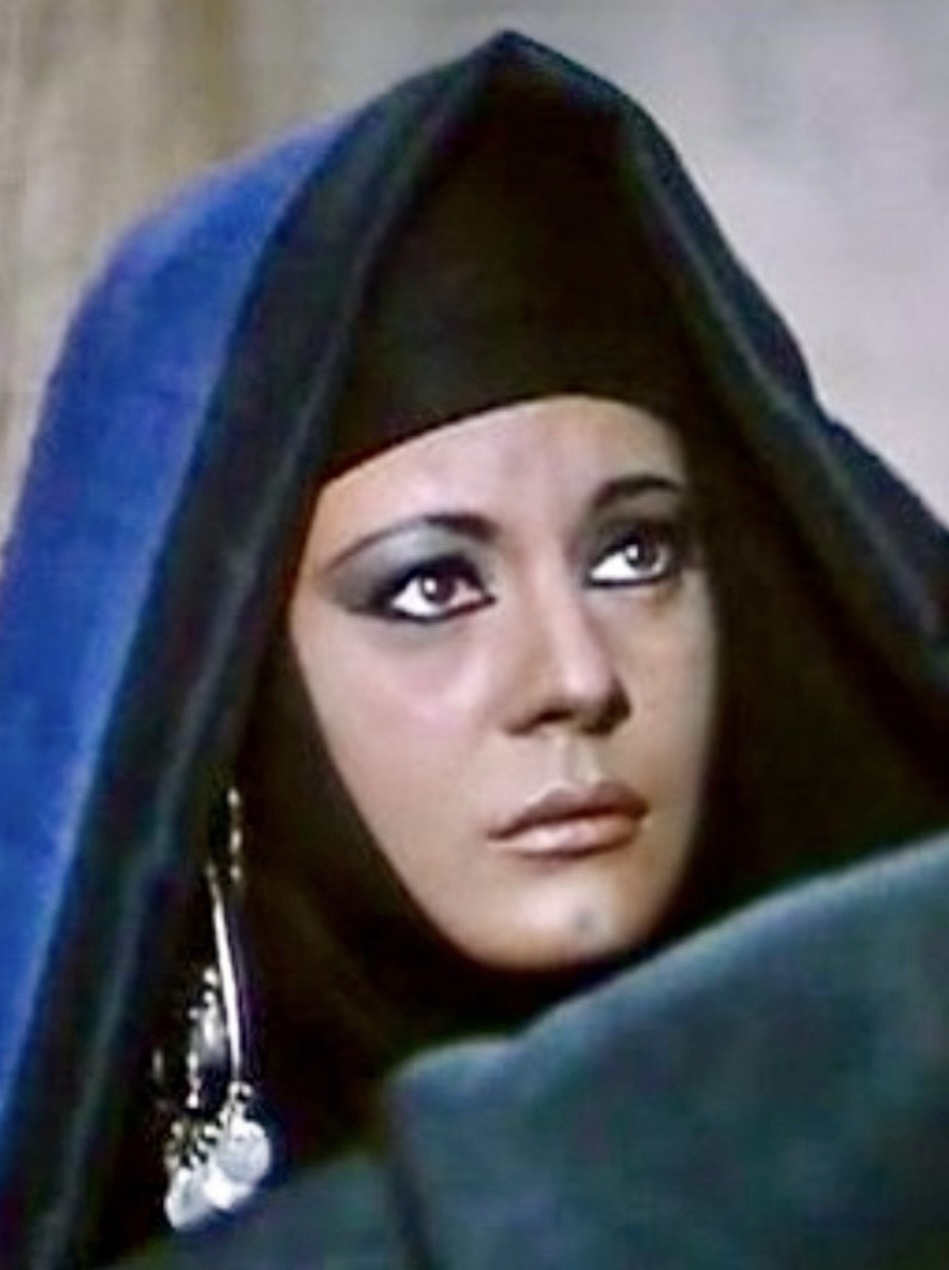
Nadia Lutfi in The Night of Counting the Years (1969)

In the 1970s, her career wound down as Egypt's "Golden Age" of films drew to a close. Her most prominent films include Regal Bila Malameh (Featureless Men) in 1972, where she played a role of a night girl; the film was a commercial hit. She also starred in El-Okhwa El-A'daa (Enemy Brothers) (1974), and Badiaa Masabni (1975) by Hassan El Imam. She also starred in Where Do You Hide the Sun? (1980). Having made close to 50 films in the first 11 years of her career, she only made three in the decade that followed, and did not work in films after 1981.

In 2014, the Cairo International Film Festival paid tribute to Nadia Lutfi by using her photo on the Festival's official poster for its 36th edition.

== Death ==
On 4 February 2020, after being in intensive care for some time, Nadia Lutfi died in Maadi Hospital, Cairo.

== Honours ==
| Country | Honour |
|---|---|
| Egypt | Order of Sciences and Arts |

== Selected filmography ==
| Year | Title | Egyptian Arabic Title |
|---|---|---|
| 1958 | Sultan | سلطان |
| 1959 | Forever Yours | حب للأبد |
| 1961 | The Sun Will Never Set | لا تطفئ الشمس |
| 1961 | With Memories | مع الذكريات |
| 1961 | Seven Girls | السبع بنات |
| 1961 | Half Virgin | نص عذراء |
| 1961 | My Only Love | حبى الوحيد |
| 1961 | Giants of Seas | عمالقة البحار |
| 1962 | Judge of Love | قاضى الغرام |
| 1962 | Schoolgirl's Diary | مذكرات تلميذه |
| 1962 | The Sins | الخطايا |
| 1962 | Without an Appointment | من غير ميعاد |
| 1962 | Struggle of Giants | صراع العمالقه |
| 1962 | Days Without Love | ايام بلا حب |
| 1962 | Come Back Mother | عودى يا امى |
| 1963 | Years of Love | سنوات الحب |
| 1963 | Saladin the Victorious | الناصر صلاح الدين |
| 1963 | Dark Glasses | النضاره السوده |
| 1963 | Marriage in Danger | جواز فى خطر |
| 1963 | Bachelor's Life | حياة عازب |
| 1964 | Between Two Palaces | بين القصرين |
| 1964 | Unforgettable Love | حب لا انساه |
| 1964 | Searcher for Love | الباحثه عن الحب |
| 1964 | Girls Revolution | ثورة البنات |
| 1964 | Youth, Love, and Merriment | شباب و حب و مرح |
| 1964 | Leave Me with Tears | دعنى و الدموع |
| 1964 | Escaper from Life | هارب من الحياه |
| 1965 | The Impossible | المستحيل |
| 1965 | Unfaithfulness | الخاينه |
| 1965 | Private Teacher | مدرس خصوصى |
| 1965 | For Men Only | للرجال فقط |
| 1966 | Enemy of Woman | عدو المرأه |
| 1966 | A Widow is Required | مطلوب ارمله |
| 1966 | Life is Sweet | الحياه حلوه |
| 1967 | Long Nights | الليالى الطويله |
| 1967 | Palace of Longing | قصر الشوق |
| 1967 | Crazy's Romances | غراميات مجنون |
| 1967 | Crime in Calm District | جريمه فى الحى الهادى |
| 1967 | When We Love | عندما نحب |
| 1967 | Quails and Autumn | السمان و الخريف |
| 1967 | Nasty Girl | بنت شقيه |
| 1968 | How to Rob Millionaire | كيف تسرق مليونير |
| 1968 | 3 Stories | ٣ قصص |
| 1968 | Days of Love | ايام الحب |
| 1969 | Pickpocket Despite His will | نشال رغم انفه |
| 1969 | Secretary of Mama | سكرتير ماما |
| 1969 | My Father Above the Tree | ابى فوق الشجره |
| 1969 | The Night of Counting the Years | الموميا |
| 1970 | They Were Days | كانت ايام |
| 1970 | Kinsman | الرجل المناسب |
| 1971 | Lovers of Life | عشاق الحياه |
| 1971 | Gentle, Gallant and Greedy | الظريف و الشهم و الطماع |
| 1971 | Confessions of a Woman | اعترافات امرأه |
| 1972 | Featureless Men | رجال بلا ملامح |
| 1972 | Visitor | الزائره |
| 1972 | Barrier | الحاجز |
| 1972 | Lights of City | اضواء المدينه |
| 1972 | Wild Flowers | زهور بريه |
| 1973 | Armies of the Sun | جيوش الشمس |
| 1974 | Bottom of City | قاع المدينه |
| 1974 | Enemies Brothers | الاخوه الاعداء |
| 1975 | Who Can Overcome Aziza | مين يقدر علا عزيزه |
| 1975 | On Transparent Papers | علا ورق سلوڤان |
| 1975 | Never, I'll Not Return | ابدا لن اعود |
| 1975 | Badi'a Masabni | بديعه مصابنى |
| 1976 | Lover of Another | حبيبة غيرى |
| 1976 | Home Without affection | بيت بلا حنان |
| 1977 | And She Fell in Sea of Honey | و سقطت فى بحر العسل |
| 1978 | Behind the Sun | ورا الشمس |
| 1978 | Journey inside a Woman | رحله داخل امرأه |
| 1978 | Elaqmar | الاقمر |
| 1980 | Where Do You Hide the Sun? | اين تخبئون الشمس؟ |
| 1982 | Bloody Fates | الأقدار الداميه |
| 1986 | House of Poisoned Family | منزل العائله المسمومه |
| 1988 | Legitimate Father | الأب الشرعى |
