= Salah Mansour =

Egyptian actor (1923–1979)

- Born: February 3, 1923; Al-Qalyubia, Egypt
- Died: January 19, 1979 (aged 55)
- Occupations: editor, actor, director

Salah Mansour (Arabic: صلاح منصور, Ṣalāḥ Manṣūr), (Feb 03, 1923 – Jan 19, 1979) was an Egyptian film and television actor known for his roles in Lan A'taref and Al-Zawga Al-Thaneya. He started in school theater, and graduated from the Egyptian acting institute in 1947. He worked in artistic-editing then joined the theater. Later he was a consultant in the Egyptian Ministry of Education

He died on January 19, 1979.

== Early life ==
Salah Mansour was born in Shibin Al-Qanater, in Al-Qalyubia, Egypt.

== Awards ==
- He was awarded for his roles in Lan A'taref (I'll never confess) - 1963 as well as Al-Zawga Al-Thaneya (The second wife) - 1968
- He received the Egyptian Evaluative Award - 1966
- Art Academy at Eid Al-Fan - Oct 8, 1978
- Order of Sciences and Arts, 2014
