= Atef Salem =

Egyptian film director (1927–2002)

Atef Salem عاطف سالم
- Born: 23 July 1927; Sudan
- Died: 30 July 2002 (aged 75); Cairo, Egypt
- Occupation: Film director
- Years active: 1954-2001

Atef Salem (Arabic: عاطف سالم; 23 July 1927 – 30 July 2002) was an Egyptian film director. He directed 32 films between 1954 and 2001. Many of his films were scripted by the novelist Naguib Mahfouz. His 1967 film Khan el khalili was entered into the 5th Moscow International Film Festival.

== Selected filmography ==
- Woman's Secret (1960)
- Mother of the Bride (1963)
- The Mamelukes (1965)
- A Wife from Paris (1966)
- Khan el khalili (1967)
- Where Is My Mind? (1974)
- Edge of the Sword (1986)
