= 33rd Venice International Film Festival =

Italian film festival in 1972

- Festival poster
- Location: Venice, Italy
- Founded: 1932
- Festival date: 21 August – 3 September 1972
- Website: Website

Venice Film Festival chronology
- 36th 32nd

The 33rd annual Venice International Film Festival was held from 21 August to 3 September 1972.

There were no official prizes because the festival was not competitive from 1969 to 1979. However, the critics' jury voted the Swedish film Foreigners, directed by Johan Bergenstrahle, the most worthy in the program. Charlie Chaplin, Anatoli Golovnya and Billy Wilder were awarded the Career Golden Lion.

== Official Selection ==
The following films were selected to be screened:

=== Venezia 33 ===
English title	Original title	Director(s)	Production country
Cabaret		Bob Fosse	United States
Calcutta 71		Mrinal Sen	India
The Candidate		Michael Ritchie	United States
A Clockwork Orange		Stanley Kubrick	United Kingdom
The Conspirators	Os Inconfidentes	Joaquim Pedro de Andrade	Brazil
The Dawns Here Are Quiet	А зори здесь тихие	Stanislav Rostotsky	Soviet Union
Dear Summer Sister	夏の妹	Nagisa Ōshima	Japan
Felix and Otilia	Felix si Otilia	Iulian Mihu	Romania
Field Lilies	Lalie polné	Elo Havetta	Czechoslovakia
Floch		Dan Wolman	Israel
A Free Woman	Strohfeuer	Volker Schlöndorff	West Germany
Klara Lust		Kjell Grede	Sweden
Life of a Shock Force Worker	Slike iz života udarnika	Bahrudin Čengić	Yugoslavia
Made		John Mackenzie	United Kingdom
The Master and Margaret	Majstor i Margarita	Aleksandar Petrović	Yugoslavia
The Merchant of Four Seasons	Händler der vier Jahreszeiten	Rainer Werner Fassbinder	West Germany
My Friend Robinson	Mein lieber Robinson	Roland Gräf	East Germany
Nathalie Granger		Marguerite Duras	France
Obscured by Clouds	La Vallée	Barbet Schroeder	France
Play It As It Lays		Frank Perry	United States
Salome	Salomé	Carmelo Bene	Italy
Savage Messiah		Ken Russell	United Kingdom
A Separate Peace		Larry Peerce	United States
Siddhartha		Conrad Rooks	United States, India
Szindbád		Zoltán Huszárik	Hungary
Tout Va Bien		Jean-Luc Godard, Jean-Pierre Gorin, Groupe Dziga Vertov	France
Tutte le domeniche mattina		Carlo Tuzii	Italy

=== Venezia Giovani ===
English title	Original title	Director(s)	Production country
The Harder They Come		Perry Henzell	Jamaica
I Was Nineteen	Ich war neunzehn	Konrad Wolf	East Germany
Ludwig: Requiem for a Virgin King	Ludwig - Requiem für einen jungfräulichen König	Hans-Jürgen Syberberg	West Germany
Narco: A Film About Love	Narko - en film om kærlighed	Claus Ørsted	Denmark
Night of the Flowers	La notte dei fiori	Gian Vittorio Baldi	Italy
Planet Venus	Pianeta Venere	Elda Tattoli	Italy
The Ragman's Daughter		Harold Becker	United Kingdom
Sea of Silence	Bas ya Bahar	Khalid Al Siddiq	Kuwait
Tonight or Never	Heute nacht oder nie	Daniel Schmid	Switzerland
The Two Seasons of Life	Les deux saisons de la vie	Samy Pavel	France
You and Me	Ты и я	Larisa Shepitko	Soviet Union

=== Venezia Critici ===
English title	Original title	Director(s)	Production country
Ağıt		Yilmaz Güney	Turkey
Her Third	Der Dritte	Egon Günther	East Germany
The Goalkeeper's Fear of the Penalty	Die Angst des Tormanns beim Elfmeter	Wim Wenders	West Germany
Take Two	הצד השני	Baruch Dienar	Israel
Foreigners	Jag heter Stelios	Johan Bergenstråhle	Sweden
The Time of the Hunt	Le temps d'une chasse	Francis Mankiewicz	Canada
My Childhood		Bill Douglas	United Kingdom
Daughter-In-Law	Nevestka	Khodzha Kuli Narliyev	Soviet Union
Nidhanaya		Lester James Peries	Sri Lanka
The Postman	پستچی	Dariush Mehrjui	Iran
The Power and the Truth	Puterea și adevărul	Manole Marcus	Romania
Shantata! Court Chalu Aahe		Satyadev Dubey	India

== Official Awards ==
=== Silver Lion ===
- Best First Film: My Childhood by Bill Douglas

=== Career Golden Lion ===
- Charlie Chaplin
- Anatoli Golovnya
- Billy Wilder

== Independent Awards ==
=== Venezia Giovani Award ===
- Best First Film: Les deux saisons de la vie by Samy Pavel

=== FIPRESCI Prize ===
- The Cruel Sea by Khalid Al Siddiq
- Seemabaddha by Satyajit Ray

=== Pasinetti Award ===
- Best Foreign Film: A Clockwork Orange by Stanley Kubrick

== Notes ==
- The 34th annual Venice International Film Festival was held from 26 August to 11 September 1975.
