= Hinduism in Los Angeles =

Hinduism in Los Angeles made its first significant impact in the late 19th century when Swami Vivekananda (1863 –1902), a disciple of Ramakrishna Paramahamsa, went on his second visit to the United States. Swami Paramananda, a disciple of Swami Vivekananda, founded the Vedanta centres in Los Angeles and Boston.

Hindu temples have emerged in the US in the urban areas in the same manner as in India. Los Angeles has witnessed the building of new temples in its suburbs, as the result of a significant community of Hindus living in Los Angeles County and the surrounding counties. The Los Angeles Hindu Society is based at the Pasadena Sivan Temple, which claims to "promote the religious, social and cultural activities and the spiritual well-being of the Hindu community in the U.S. state of California.

== History ==
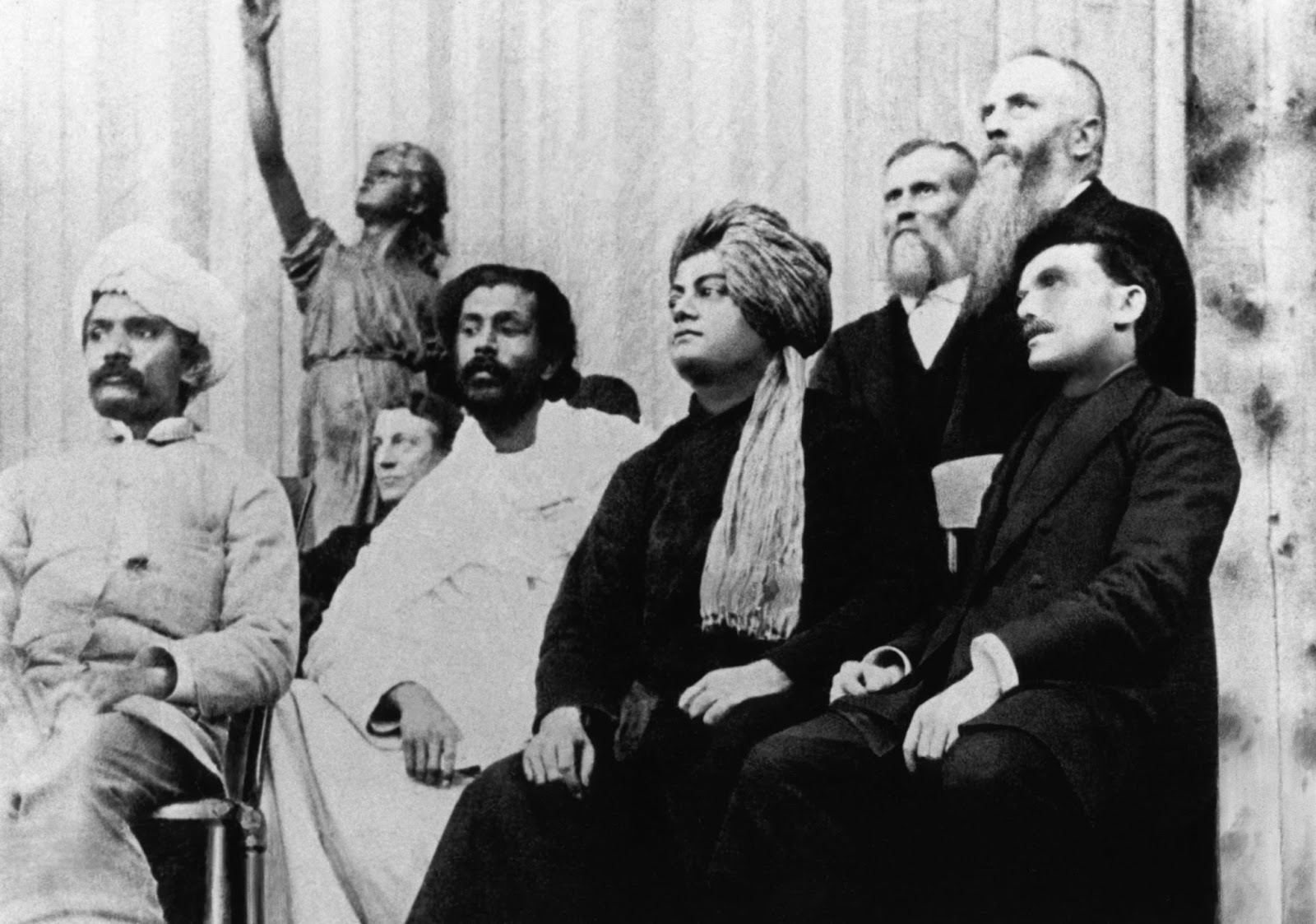
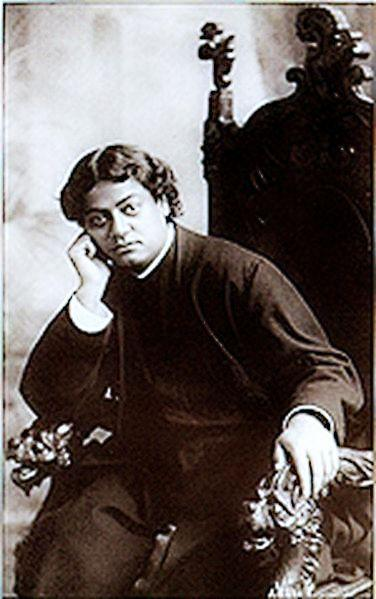
Left: Swami Vivekananda on the platform of the Parliament of Religions, September 1893, (left to right) Virchand Gandhi, Dharmapala, Swami Vivekananda; Right: Swami Vivekananda– the photo was taken in Bushnell Studio in San Francisco, California 1900.

=== Background ===
The earliest history of awareness of Hinduism in the United States was in the early nineteenth century through the translated books of Bhagavad Gita from the Sanskrit text of the Hindus, which were very well received by noted scholars like Henry David Thoreau and Ralph Waldo Emerson in the field of transcendentalism. This was followed by the visit of P. C. Mozoomdar, a scholarly teacher from India, to Massachusetts in 1880. When he returned along with Swami Vivekananda to attend the 1893 World Parliament of Religions, he was overshadowed by Swami Vivekananda with his great oratorical skill. The beginning of Hinduism's influence on the US is attributable to Vivekananda who established the Ramakrishna Mission (a non-sectarian organization that does not subscribe to caste distinctions) in India after visiting New York and Los Angeles in 1895.

=== 19th century ===
During his first visit to the US, Vivekananda established the Vedanta Society in 1894. His urge to live as a sanyasi (renunciation of worldly pleasures) made him convert two of his disciples as sanyasis, Madame Marie Louise and Herr Leon Handsberg, and changed their names as Swami Abhayananda and Swami Kripananda respectively so that they could continue the work of the mission of the Vedantha Society. This society even to this day is filled with foreign nationals and is also located in Los Angeles. He then traveled in August 1885 to Europe for the next few months and returned to the US in 1985. Vivekananda became the catalyst for establishing the Vedanta Societies, the first Hindu group in America in New York, San Francisco, Los Angeles, and Chicago.

Vivekananda sent Swami Saradananda from India to assist him in the work of his Vedanta Society and deputed him to New York first and then toured many places in the US giving lectures. In Los Angeles, Vivekananda delivered a series of lectures at several notable locations, and gave lectures on the concept of “The Way to the Realization of the Universalization of a Universal Religion” and others. He spent a month at the "Home of Truth" and noted that of all Americans, “Californians are specially fit to understand the raja-yoga of intuitive meditation which he labeled Applied Psychology”. Thereafter, many Vedanta centers were founded in California under the stewardship of C.F. Patterson. To keep up with the pace of development he recalled Turiyananda as one of his disciples to California. During this period of his stay in Los Angeles, Vivekananda was gifted a large area of land by one of his devotees, which was a forested hilly terrain about 12 miles from Lick Observatory, an area of 160 acres, to build a retreat to house Vedanta students. He called it a Peace retreat or Santi Asrama. Turiyananda trained students here in the art of “meditation and austere monastic life of India.” After the death of Vivekananda, it was Swami Yogananda who took over the control of the Vendantha centers from 1920 and stayed in the US permanently. In 1925 he instituted the Yogananda Satsang. The American headquarters of the Vedanta Society (one of the twelve) in USA is located in Los Angeles. There is a Vedanta Press in Hollywood which publishes Hindu scriptures and translates texts to English.

=== 20th century-present ===
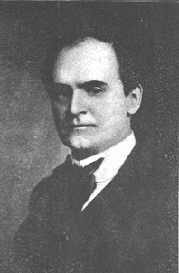
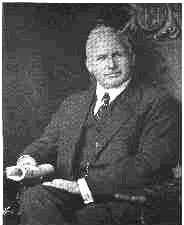
Left: William Walker Atkinson given the name Yogi Ramacharaka; Right: Benedict Lust one of the founders of naturopathic medicine in the first decade of the twentieth century.

The renaissance of Hinduism was followed by Baba Bharati, a hermit who lived in the US for five years from 1904 to 1909 and established his cult in various parts of the country. He established the Rama Krishna Temple in Los Angeles, which had 5,000 followers. His teachings centered on the theme of preaching "eternal Hinduism unadulterated by the West".

Yogi Hari Rama taught Hinduism briefly from 1925 to 1 September 1928 and established National headquarters of the Benares League in Los Angeles. His main activity centered on yoga but interspersed with some teachings related sociology and theology with the “professed aim of communal and international brotherhood.”

Swami Yogananda went to the US in 1922, founded the Self-Realization Fellowship, and introduced techniques of Kriya Yoga. He trained Benedict Lust, a specialist in naturopathic medicine. Prior to this, Ramacharaka and Yogendra had also contributed to the spread of yoga throughout the US. However, the success of Hinduism had a setback when the Asian Exclusion Act was introduced in 1924.

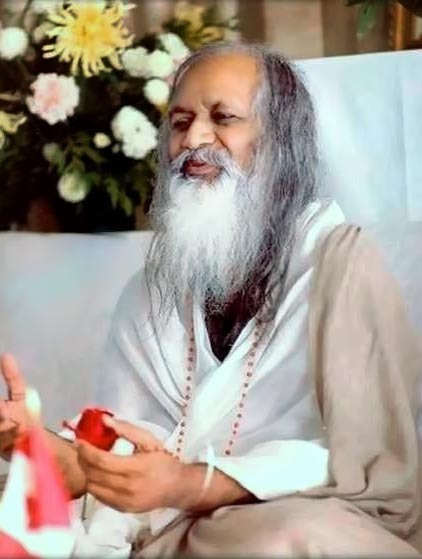
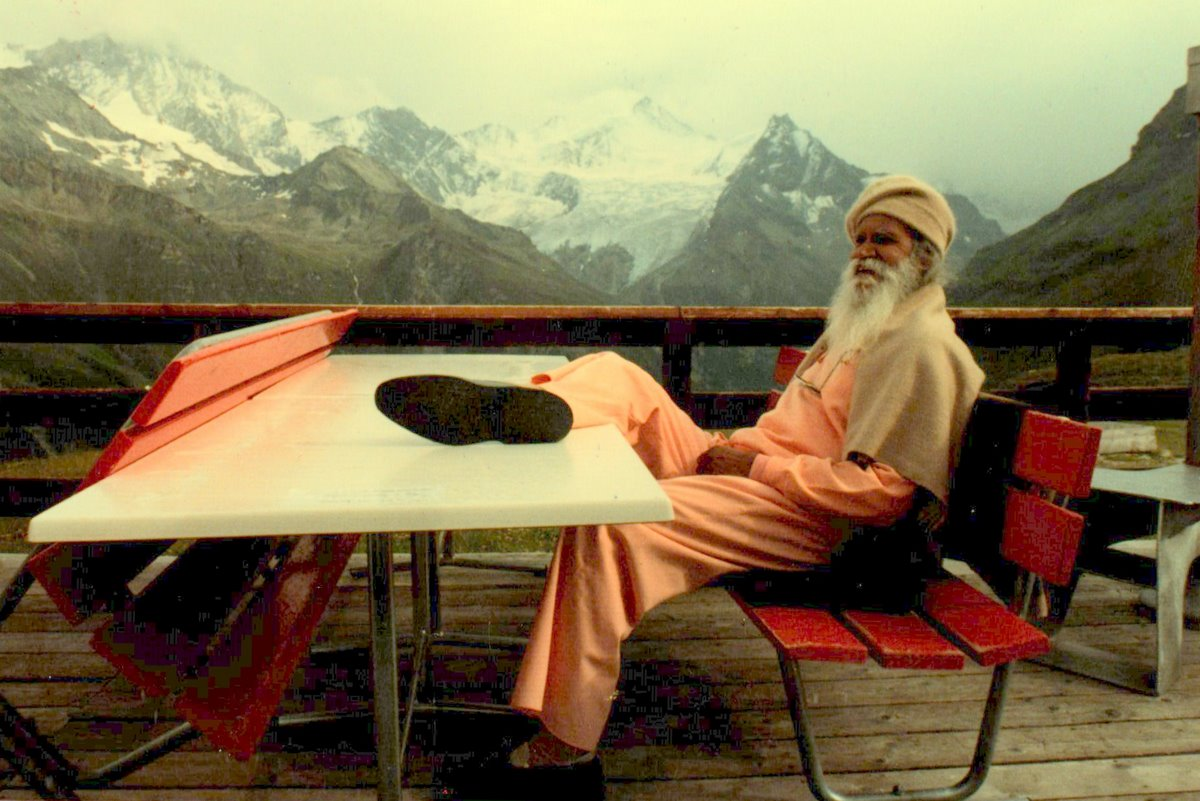
Left: Maharishi Mahesh Yogi of the Transcendental Meditation movement; Right: Satchidananda, the Yoga adept

Following the introduction of the new Immigration Act 1965, several movements came into existence throughout US such as the Maharishi Mahesh Yogi of the TM movement, Swami Bhaktivedanta of International Society for Krishna Consciousness (ISKON), and Swami Satchidananda, founder of the Integral Yoga Institute. This was followed by the temple building boom in the east in the 1970s, which was followed in the 1980s and 1990s in other urban centers such as Los Angeles, and many other centers. The miraculous feat of milk offered to Hindu gods being supposedly "taken" by them was also witnessed at the Norwalk and Chatsworth temples.

Occurrences of anti-Hindu acts have been reported in Los Angeles. According to the Hindu Temple Society in Los Angeles, the board members meet frequently and discuss the issue of hate crimes against Hindus and has noted that the City Zoning Regulations are adversely interpreted against their temple.

== Temples ==
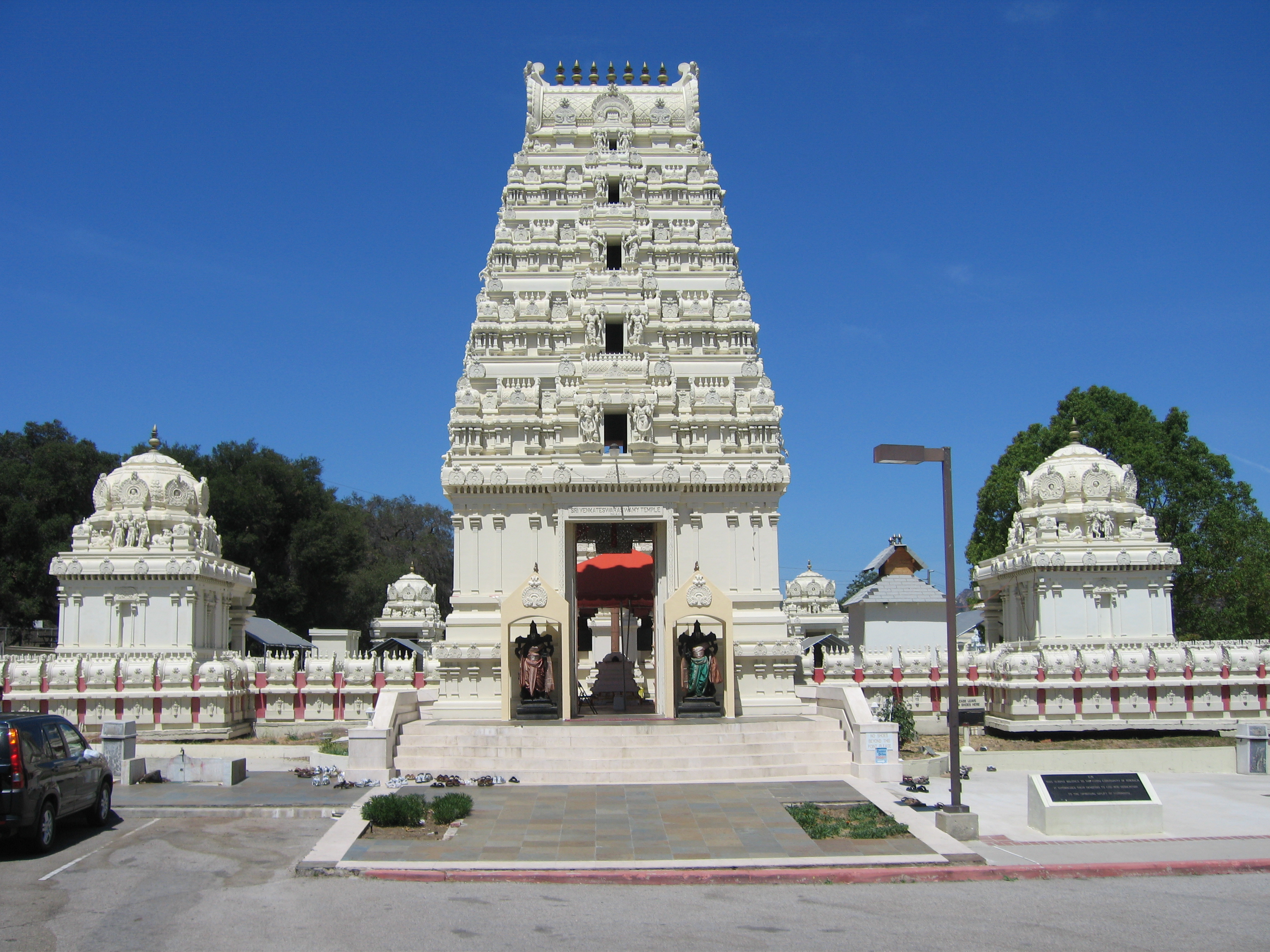
Malibu Hindu Temple, Malibu

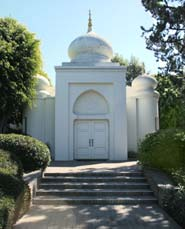
Vedanta Temple, Los Angeles

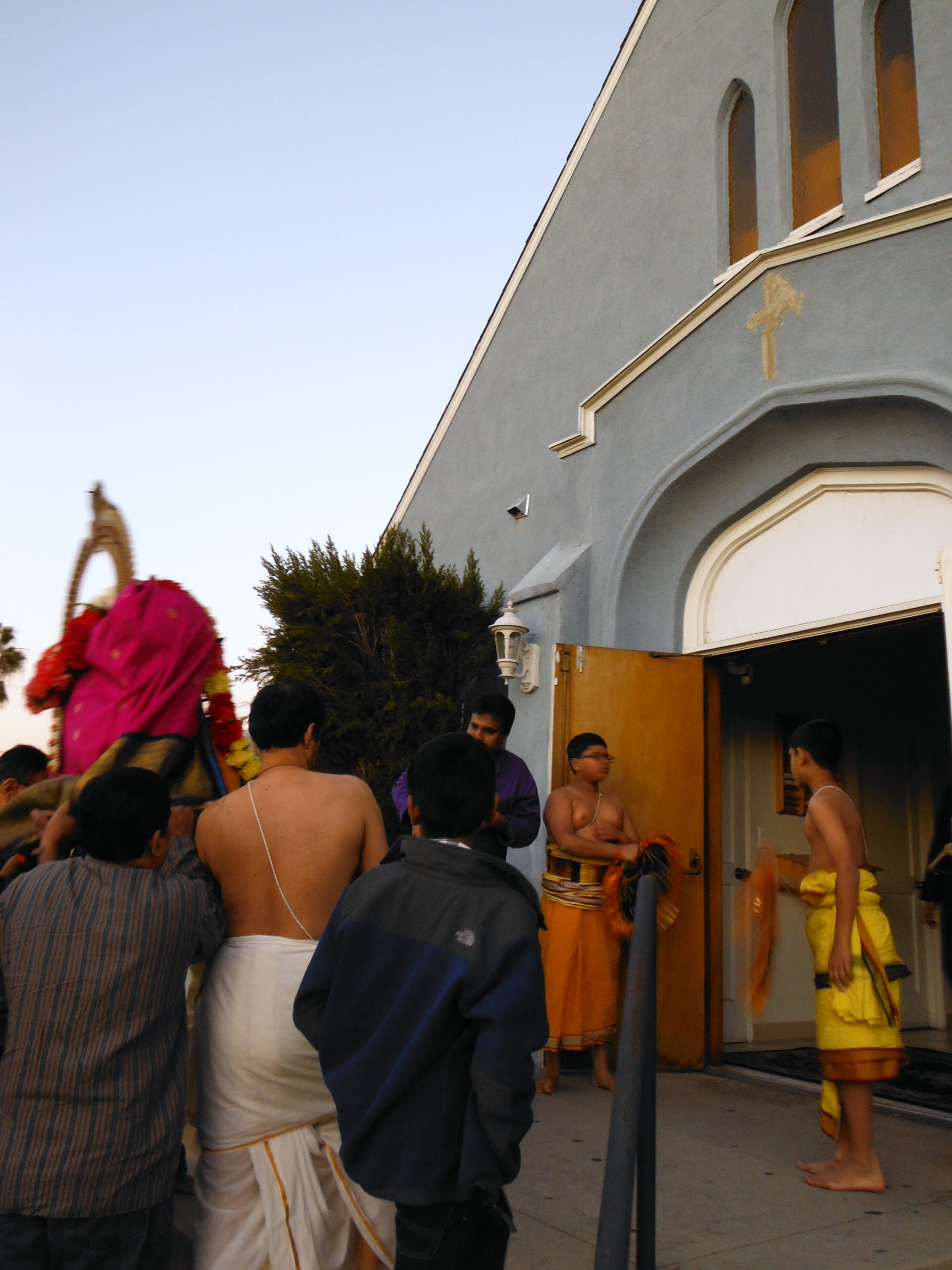
The Ashtalakshmi temple is in a former Christian Church, North Hollywood

The American Hinduism community is to a large extent built around the traditional temple culture. The three dominant traditions followed in temple building, known in Hinduism as sampradaya, are; the worship of Vishnu by the Vaishnavites in his several incarnated forms of Krishna, Rama, Venkateshvara and so forth; worship of the Lord Shiva and his consort Parvathi including their children Muruga and Ganesh; and worship of Shakthi in the form of Devi, Durga, Kali, Lakshmi and many other formats. In the initial years, the temples were sampradaya specific while over the years the temples have been built with a multi-religious focus within the same structure or as any annexe structure. The temples in Los Angeles belong to both categories; the Malibu temple is devoted to Venkateshwara while many others are of the mixed type.

=== Malibu Hindu Temple ===
Situated in the hills above Malibu, in Calabasas, the Malibu Hindu Temple, established in 1984, was the "first big Hindu temple" in Los Angeles. The Malibu Hindu Temple is a mountain spiritual retreat. The temple is dedicated to the Hindu god Venkateswara.

The temple was the venue for a small scene in the movie Beverly Hills Ninja, in 1997, starring Chris Farley. In 1998, a song sequence was recorded around this temple in the Tamil film Jeans. In January 2006, pop star Britney Spears had her 4-month-old son blessed in a large ceremony by the Hindu priests of this temple. The event was covered worldwide by the media.

=== Other temples ===
While all states in the US have one or more Hindu centers of worship, California tops the list with 296 centers. Of these there are many Hindu temples in Los Angeles County. These include the Aurobindo Center of Los Angeles, Culver City; Hare Krishna Temple, Los Angeles; Radha Govinda Gaudiya Matha, Venice; RamKabir Mandir, Carson; The BAPS Shri Swaminarayan Mandir, Chino Hills; the Sri Ashtalakshmi Sametha Venkateswara Swamy Temple, North Hollywood.

Brief features of a few other Hindu temples are given below.

The Sanatana Dharma Temple has the main Hindu deities deified in a row and regular religious and cultural festivals are part of the temple schedule.

On the east side of Los Angeles is the Lakshmi Narayan Mandir, spread over an area of 4 acres of land. The navagraha (idols of nine planets) ceiling in the temple is a special feature.

The oldest temple in southern Los Angeles, the Radha-Krishna Temple contains idols of Radha and Krishna and also of Ram Parivar (Family of God Rama) and also of Lord Shiva, which setting is in line with current trend of mixed sampradaya temples.

Another temple promoted by the Sindhi community is the Sindhu Temple. It has idols of Radha, Krishna, Ram Parivar, Lord Shiva and Parvati, all Hindu gods and in particular the Sindhi god Jhulelal and also Guru Nanak.

== See also ==
Hinduism in the United States

== Bibliography ==
- Badlani, Hiro G. (September 30, 2008). Hinduism: Path of the Ancient Wisdom. iUniverse. ISBN 978-0-595-87961-8.
- Orsi, Robert A. (July 22, 1999). Gods of the City: Religion and the American Urban Landscape. Indiana University Press. ISBN 978-0-253-11331-3.
- Thomas, Wendell (August 1, 2003). Hinduism Invades America 1930. Kessinger Publishing. ISBN 978-0-7661-8013-0.
- Jackson, Carl T. (May 22, 1994). Vedanta for the West: The Ramakrishna Movement in the United States. Indiana University Press. ISBN 978-0-253-11388-7.
- Melton, J. Gordon (April 7–10, 2011). "Reflections on Hindu Demographics in America: An Initial Report on the First American Hindu Census" (PDF). Association for the Study of Religion, Economics & Culture.
- Rinehart, Robin, ed. (2004). Contemporary Hinduism: Ritual, Culture, and Practice. ABC-CLIO. ISBN 978-1-57607-905-8.
- Wuthnow, Robert (July 1, 2011). America and the Challenges of Religious Diversity. Princeton University Press. ISBN 978-1-4008-3724-3.
