= Siddhartha (1972 film) =

1972 film based on the novel of the same name by Hermann Hesse

- Directed by: Conrad Rooks
- Written by: Conrad Rooks; Natasha Ullman; Paul Mayersberg
- Produced by: Conrad Rooks
- Starring: Shashi Kapoor; Simi Garewal; Romesh Sharma
- Cinematography: Sven Nykvist
- Edited by: Willy Kemplen
- Music by: Hemant Kumar
- Distributed by: Columbia Pictures
- Release dates: September 1, 1972 (Venice); July 18, 1973 (United States)
- Running time: 89 minutes
- Countries: United States; India
- Language: English

Siddhartha is a 1972 Indo-American drama film based on the 1922 novel of the same name by Hermann Hesse. Produced, written and directed by Conrad Rooks, it stars Shashi Kapoor as Siddhartha, with Simi Garewal as courtesan Kamala in lead roles, with Romesh Sharma, Pinchoo Kapoor and Zul Vellani in supporting roles. The film follows a young Brahmin's spiritual quest for self-knowledge and enlightenment as he moves through asceticism, worldly wealth, sensual love and renunciation.

It was shot on location in Northern India, and features work by noted cinematographer Sven Nykvist. The locations used for the film were the holy city of Rishikesh and the private estates and palaces of the Maharajah of Bharatpur. The film was screened at the 33rd Venice International Film Festival in September 1972 and was subsequently distributed in the United States by Columbia Pictures in 1973.

== Plot ==
The film tells the story of the young Siddhartha (played by Shashi Kapoor), born in a rich family, and his search for a meaningful way of life. This search takes him through periods of harsh asceticism, sensual pleasures, material wealth, then self-revulsion and eventually to the oneness and harmony with himself that he has been seeking. Siddhartha learns that the secret of life cannot be passed on from one person to another, but must be achieved through inner experience.

== Cast ==
- Shashi Kapoor as Siddhartha
- Simi Garewal as Kamala
- Romesh Sharma as Govinda
- Pinchoo Kapoor as Kamaswami
- Zul Vellani as Vasudeva
- Amrik Singh as Father
- Kunal Kapoor as Son
- Shanti Hiranand as Mother

== Production ==
=== Development and casting ===
Rooks was first introduced to Hermann Hesse's novel Siddhartha by his then wife, Zina Rachevsky, who later became a Tibetan Buddhist nun. He began developing an adaptation of the novel during the late 1960s. In 1967, an early version was described as a "drama-documentary", with Rooks considering a cast that included Peter Fonda, John Drew Barrymore and Orson Welles.In 1968, producer Walter Reade Jr. agreed to finance two-thirds of the production provided Rooks obtained the screen rights from Hesse's heirs. At this stage, Indian film director Satyajit Ray was expected to direct the film. By 1970, Warner Bros. was planning to finance production in India, with British cinematographer Walter Lassally in negotiations to photograph the film. Warner Bros. subsequently withdrew from the project following creative disagreements, as the studio had approved a screenplay by Lewis John Carlino, which Rooks wanted to be substantially rewritten. The film was finally produced by Rooks through Lotus Group N.V. in association with Columbia Pictures.

For the title role of Siddhartha was first offered to Amitabh Bachchan, while Rekha was considered for the role of Kamala. Rooks wanted Bachchan to be available continuously for several months, however Bachchan declined because of his existing film commitments. Shashi Kapoor was ultimately cast as Siddhartha opposite Simi Garewal as Kamala. The film marked Kapoor's first leading role in an American production and the screen debut of his son Kunal Kapoor. The monks appearing in the film were actual Tibetan Buddhist monks and sadhus of Rishikesh.

Bhanu Athaiya designed the costumes and jewellery for the film after research about the historical setting of the story.researching the historical setting

=== Filming ===
Principal photography of the film took place entirely on location in northern India in November 1971, with major parts being shot in Rishikesh and on the private estates and in the palaces of the Maharaja of Bharatpur, including Deeg Palace complex and its gardens,and also Keoladeo Bird Sanctuary at Bharatpur in Rajasthan. Swedish cinematographer Sven Nykvist, known for his collaboration with Ingmar Bergman, photographed the film with a three-member camera crew from Sweden.

== Music ==
All the Indian music was composed and sung by Hemant Kumar, with lyrics to the songs by Gauriprasanna Mazumdar. “Mother's Song” was written and composed by Shanti Hiranand, who also played Siddhartha's mother in the film.

Kumar's two previously recorded Bengali songs, were adapted for Siddhartha: "Pather Klanti Bhule" from the 1956 movie Maru Tirtha Hinglaj and "O Nodire Ekti Kotha Shudhai" from the 1959 movie Neel Akasher Neechey. The latter is repeated over the film's closing credits.

No soundtrack album for the film was issued.

== Release and revival ==
The film was screened at the 33rd Venice International Film Festival on 1 September 1972, with a running time of approximately 95 minutes. Rooks subsequently encountered difficulty securing distribution. Columbia Pictures, which had become involved with the production, ultimately distributed the film and opened an edited 86-minute version in New York on 18 July 1973.The film premiered in the West and the U.S. to positive reviews. Then during the 1970s and 1980s, it disappeared from distribution and runs in theaters by1987.

A restored version prepared by the German company Winkler Films was re-released theatrically in the United States by Milestone Films in 2002. A Region 1 DVD followed through Milestone Film & Video and Image Entertainment. Those who saw the film applauded it as a tale of self-discovery and praised the restoration work.

== Reception ==
The film received mixed reviews in USA, a review survey published by The New York Times recorded six favourable reviews, two mixed reviews and seven negative reviews among major American critics. Roger Ebert of the Chicago Sun-Times praised the film's visual qualities, describing it as a work of "great grace and beauty", but found it emotionally uninvolving. He considered Sven Nykvist's photography exceptionally attractive, while arguing that the emphasis on picturesque landscapes and lighting made the characters and their actions appear less immediate. Similarly, the Variety while praising the film's visual elegance felt that its stylisation diminished some of the earthiness and sensuality of the story. Vincent Canby of The New York Times was more critical, characterising the film as overly solemn and dismissing it as a "small-scale Ten Commandments for flower children". Shawn Levy of The Oregonian praised its visual beauty and Nykvist's use of natural light, while Janice Page of The Boston Globe regarded the restored cinematography as the principal reason for the film's continuing appeal.

On Rotten Tomatoes, the film holds an approval rating of 60% based on 20 critics' reviews. The 2002 re-release has a weighted score of 80 out of 100 on Metacritic, based on seven reviews, indicating "generally favorable" reception.

=== Controversy in India ===
Simi Garewal's nude scene caused controversy in India. The Indian Censor Board, at that time, did not even permit on-screen kissing in Indian films. The film faced difficulties with the Indian censors and was eventually released with cuts. The controversy intensified after nude and semi-nude stills of Garewal from the film appeared in Indian film magazines. In 1974, Garewal unsuccessfully sought an injunction against Film World magazine to prevent it from publishing one such image. Proceedings before the Bombay High Court also recorded an agreement between Garewal and director Conrad Rooks that the love and semi-nude scenes would not be screened in India without her permission. The court dismissed her appeal, finding that the photograph accurately represented a scene from the film and that she had not established a prima facie case for restraining its publication.

== See also ==
- List of historical drama films of Asia
- Depictions of Gautama Buddha in film
