= Made in Sweden (film) =

1969 film

- Directed by: Johan Bergenstråhle
- Written by: Johan Bergenstråhle; Sven Fagerberg
- Produced by: Bengt Forslund
- Starring: Lena Granhagen
- Cinematography: Gunnar Fischer
- Release date: 17 March 1969
- Country: Sweden
- Language: Swedish

Made in Sweden is a 1969 Swedish drama film directed by Johan Bergenstråhle, who also wrote the screenplay based on Sven Fagerberg's 1966 novel Det vitmålade hjärtat. It was entered into the 19th Berlin International Film Festival, where it won a Silver Bear award.

== Cast ==
- Lena Granhagen – Kristina
- Per Myrberg – Jörgen Stenberg
- Max von Sydow – Magnus Rud
- Karl-Birger Blomdahl – Olof Myhre
- Börje Ahlstedt – Jesper Rud
- Ingvar Kjellson – Niklas Hedström
- Fred Hjelm – Jonas Myhre
- Lars Amble – Martin
- Toivo Pawlo – Man at Solvalla
- Olof Bergström – Grönroos
- Gunnar Arvidson – Editor at newspaper
- Achit Unhanandana – Monk in Bangkok

== Plot ==
Swedish journalists Kristina and Jörgen go to Thailand to investigate rumors that a Swedish company is involved in illegal arms sales there. They uncover a gun-running operation on the borders of Vietnam. The trail leads to a financial group of wealthy industrialists led by Magnus Rud. The idealistic journalists refuse to bury the story, leading to trouble for them in this political drama about the war machine and freedom of the press.
