= Iria Leino =

Finnish painter and model (1932–2022)

Iria Leino (born Irja Aira Leino; 22 December 1932, Helsinki – 8 March 2022, New York City) was a Finnish-born painter.

== Early life and education ==
Born Irja Aira Leino in 1932, she was raised by a family friend after her mother died in 1938. Leino pursued studies in art and fashion design in Finland before relocating to Paris on a scholarship to attend the École des Beaux-Arts. During her time in Paris, she also worked as a fashion journalist and model.

== Career ==
In the 1950s, Leino established herself as a model, walking for fashion houses such as Pierre Balmain and Christian Dior. She adopted the name Iria after a misspelling of her original name during a modeling session.

Leino moved to New York City in 1964 and transitioned from modeling to painting following the development of a chronic eating disorder. She became a practicing Buddhist, influenced by the teachings of Swami Satchidananda Saraswati, founder of the Integral Yoga Institute in Manhattan.

In 1978, Leino faced eviction from her Greene Street studio when the building became a co-op. She resisted eviction through legal action, supported by pro bono lawyers, and declined a relocation offer.

== Work ==
Leino's body of work includes abstract paintings, plasticky paint applications, and portraits, notably of Swami Satchidananda. She also created a nonrepresentational series titled Buddhist Rain and was known to paint while chanting mantras. Her works varied in size, and one notable piece, Homecoming (After), features high-heeled shoes and whiskey bottles.

After her death, her studio was found to contain over 1,000 paintings, most of which have never been seen in public, and many of which are posthumously being exhibited.

== Personal life ==
In 2018, Leino married Robert Alan Saasto, a Finnish American lawyer, although other sources state that she never married. Leino owned properties in the 6th arrondissement of Paris and in Taormina, Sicily. She authorized the sale of her Paris residence for approximately $650,000 and established a trust with the proceeds.
