= Chappaqua (film) =

- Directed by: Conrad Rooks
- Written by: Conrad Rooks
- Produced by: Conrad Rooks
- Starring: Jean-Louis Barrault; William S. Burroughs; Allen Ginsberg; Swami Satchidananda; Ornette Coleman
- Cinematography: Étienne Becker; Robert Frank; Eugen Schüfftan
- Edited by: Kenout Peltier
- Music by: Ravi Shankar
- Distributed by: Regional Film Distributors
- Release date: November 5, 1967
- Running time: 82 minutes
- Country: United States
- Language: English

Chappaqua is a 1967 American drama film, written and directed by Conrad Rooks. The film is based on Rooks' experiences with drug addiction and includes cameo appearances by William S. Burroughs, Swami Satchidananda, Allen Ginsberg, Moondog, Ornette Coleman, The Fugs, and Ravi Shankar. Rooks had commissioned Coleman to compose music for the film, but his score, which has become known as the Chappaqua Suite, was not used. Ravi Shankar then composed a score.

The picture has become a cult film.

== Plot ==
American Russel Harwick travels to a villa outside Paris to receive treatment for drug addiction. During withdrawals, he experiences a series of flashbacks to his experiences in New York City and other parts of the world, and has numerous hallucinations.

The film briefly depicts Chappaqua, New York, a hamlet in Westchester County, in a few minutes of wintry panoramas. In the film, the hamlet is an overt symbol of drug-free suburban childhood innocence. It also serves as one of the film's many nods to Native American culture. The word "chappaqua" translates to, as per The New York Times, to a "Place where the brush makes a rustling sound when you walk through," "a separate place" or "rustling or rattling land."

== Cast ==
- Jean-Louis Barrault as Dr. Benoit
- Conrad Rooks as Russel Harwick
- William S. Burroughs as Opium Jones
- Allen Ginsberg as Messie
- Ravi Shankar as Dieu du Soleil
- Paula Pritchett as Water Woman
- Ornette Coleman as Peyote Eater
- Swami Satchidananda as The Guru
- Moondog as The Prophet
- Ed Sanders, Tuli Kupferberg, Ken Weaver and three others as The Fugs
- Rita Renoir
- Hervé Villechaize
- Penny Brown as the nurse

== Production ==
The film was shot in England, France, India, Jamaica, Mexico, Sri Lanka and the United States.

== Release ==
The film debuted in competition at the 27th Venice International Film Festival where it won the Special Jury Prize, and was subsequently released by Regional Film Distributors, a newly formed subsidiary of Universal Pictures, in New York City on November 5, 1967. It was re-released in 1970 by Minotaur Releasing.
