= Integral Yoga (Satchidananda) =

System of yoga

Integral Yoga is a system of yoga that claims to synthesize six branches of classical Yoga and practice: Hatha, Raja, Bhakti, Karma, Jnana, and Japa yoga. It was brought to the West by Swami Satchidananda, the first centre being founded in 1966. Its aim is to integrate body, mind, and spirit, using physical practices and philosophical approaches to life to develop the physical, emotional, intellectual, and spiritual aspects of individuals. The system includes the practices of asana (yoga postures), pranayama (breathing exercises), and meditation to develop physical and mental stillness so as to access inner peace and joy, which Satchidananda believed was a person's true nature. It also encourages practitioners to live service-oriented lives.

Integral Yoga is based on interfaith understanding. Satchidananda taught that all religions share essential universal principles and encouraged Integral Yogis to respect and honor the unity in diversity, summarized by his motto, "Truth is one, paths are many." It is not a religion, but a combination of teachings that form the foundation of spiritual practice. Its branches are not hierarchical in nature; practitioners can find a combination of practices that suits their individual needs.

Classes of Integral Yoga are taught around the world. Its headquarters, Satchidananda Ashram–Yogaville, is in Buckingham, Virginia.

== Teachings ==
The main practices of Integral Yoga focus on restoring the ease and peace of the body and mind. Swami Satchidananda said that "dis-ease"—the disturbance of one's natural ease—is the cause of disease, so prevention and restoration are the hallmarks of Integral Yoga practices.

=== Principles ===
Integral Yoga states that its teachings are rooted in Patanjali's Yoga Sutras. Foundational teachings include moral and ethical precepts (yama and niyama), which include non-violence, truthfulness, non-stealing, moderation, non-greed, purity, contentment, self-discipline, spiritual study, and leading a dedicated or selfless life. Integral Yoga synthesizes the following six branches of classical Yoga.

Hatha Yoga combines asanas with pranayama, and deep relaxation. A vegetarian diet and abstinence from tobacco, alcohol, and other stimulants are part of this physical component. Patanjali stated that asanas should be "steady and comfortable." Therefore, Integral Yoga practitioners are encouraged to avoid over-exertion and to take periods of rest and relaxation during their practice, allowing for a more meditative flow.

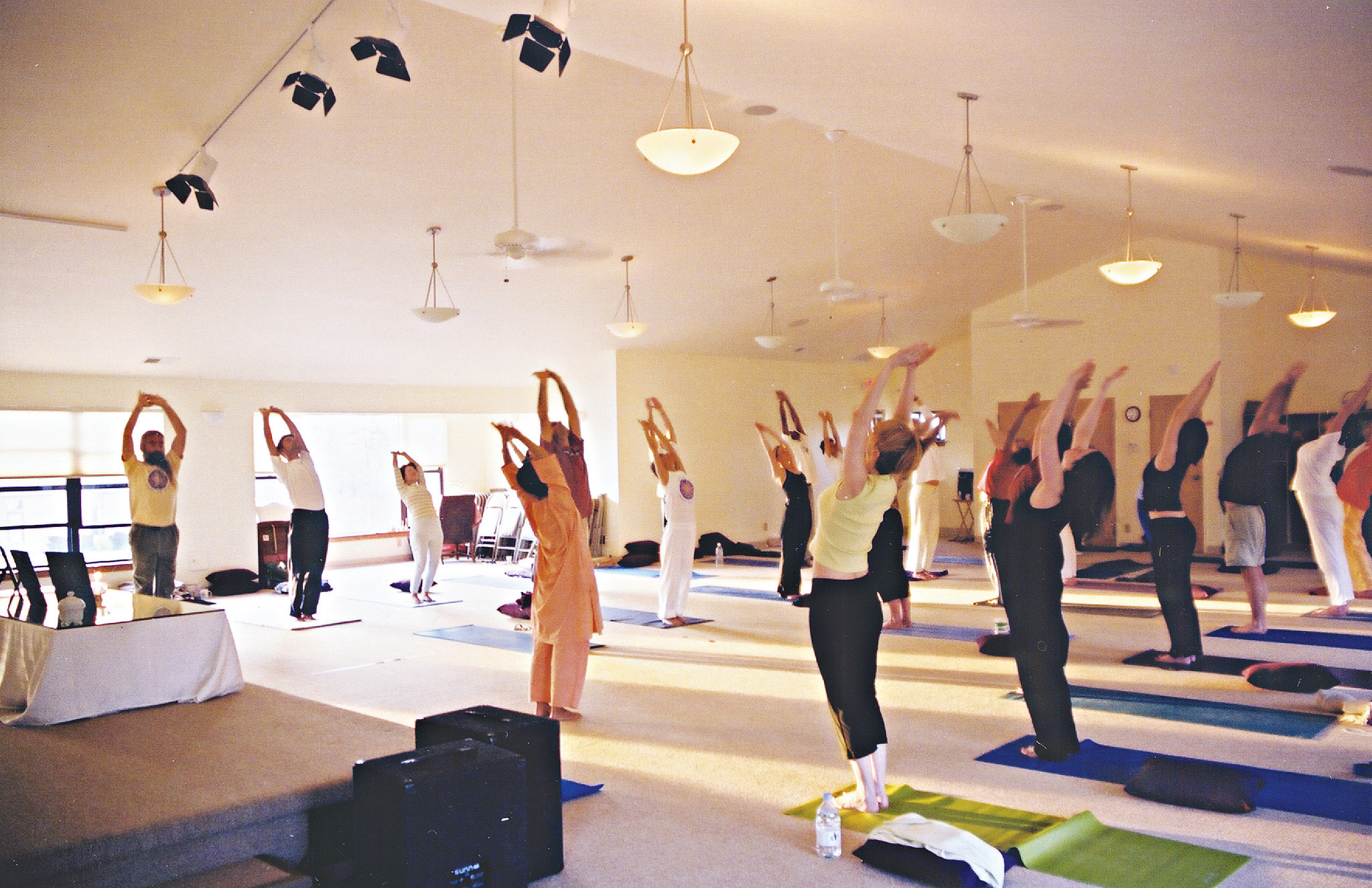
A swami leads an Integral Yoga hatha course at the Satchidananda Ashram in Yogaville.

Raja Yoga is the path of meditation and self-discipline, based on ethical principles. Practicing the eight limbs of Yoga described in the Yoga Sutras of Patanjali helps to strengthen and harmonize all aspects of the individual, culminating in Self-realization. The Yoga Sutras offer detailed guidance on how to practice. In the Integral Yoga tradition, these teachings are seen as tools for transformation. Swami Satchidananda encouraged his students to implement them in daily life, explaining that, "The teachings of Raja Yoga are a golden key to unlock all health, happiness, peace, and joy."

Bhakti Yoga, the practice that focuses on cultivating love and devotion toward God, is derived from the Bhagavad Gita and the Yoga Sutras of Patanjali, which assert that total love and surrender to God would aid the practitioner on the path to enlightenment. In the Integral Yoga tradition, Bhakti Yoga is practiced in many ways. Common practices include kirtan call-and-response chanting, prayer, puja (worship), and "constant remembrance of the divine". The Integral Yogi finds these devotional practices to be external expressions of an internal attitude of surrender, or releasing the ego's selfish wanting.

Karma Yoga is selfless service, a form of meditation in action. It gives without expecting anything in return; thinking of the actions themselves as an offering to the divine or to all of humanity. In the Integral Yoga tradition, Karma Yoga is a central practice. Swami Satchidananda taught that the key to happiness is being of service to others. His motto was "The dedicated ever enjoy supreme peace and joy. Therefore, live only to serve."

Jnana Yoga, the path of wisdom, involves study, analysis, and the cultivation of greater awareness. Through it, practitioners strive to cease to identify with their bodies and minds and realize the unchanging "witness" within. To attain this awareness, Integral Yogis practice reflection and self-inquiry, both of which can be forms of meditation. Reflection means that a part of the mind stands back and observes; this part of the mind is referred to as the witness. Self-inquiry in Jnana Yoga is a more direct questioning of "Who am I?"—a practice aimed at aiding a practitioner in experiencing his or her true identity.

Japa Yoga, mantra repetition, is one of the easiest and most effective direct approaches to developing a successful meditation practice. When one utilizes a mantra, that mantra represents and invokes in one's system a particular aspect of the "cosmic vibration." Swami Satchidananda explained that mantras don't have to have personal meaning—anything that calms and uplifts the mind when repeated could be considered mantra. However, he also suggested that selected mantras, given through an initiation, could be beneficial, "like a prescription signed by a doctor."

== Spread in the West ==
In 1966, filmmaker Conrad Rooks invited Swami Satchidananda to visit Europe. During this visit, he was invited to give talks and classes at Divine Life Societies throughout Europe. He returned to Europe thereafter, having received invitations to speak on Integral Yoga at Yoga conferences, at Yoga centers, and to serve as an advisor to Yoga organizations. During the first European visit, pop artist Peter Max consulted with Rooks and then suggested that Swami Satchidananda visit America on his return to the East. A two-day visit led to an extended stay in order to teach Integral Yoga to American students.

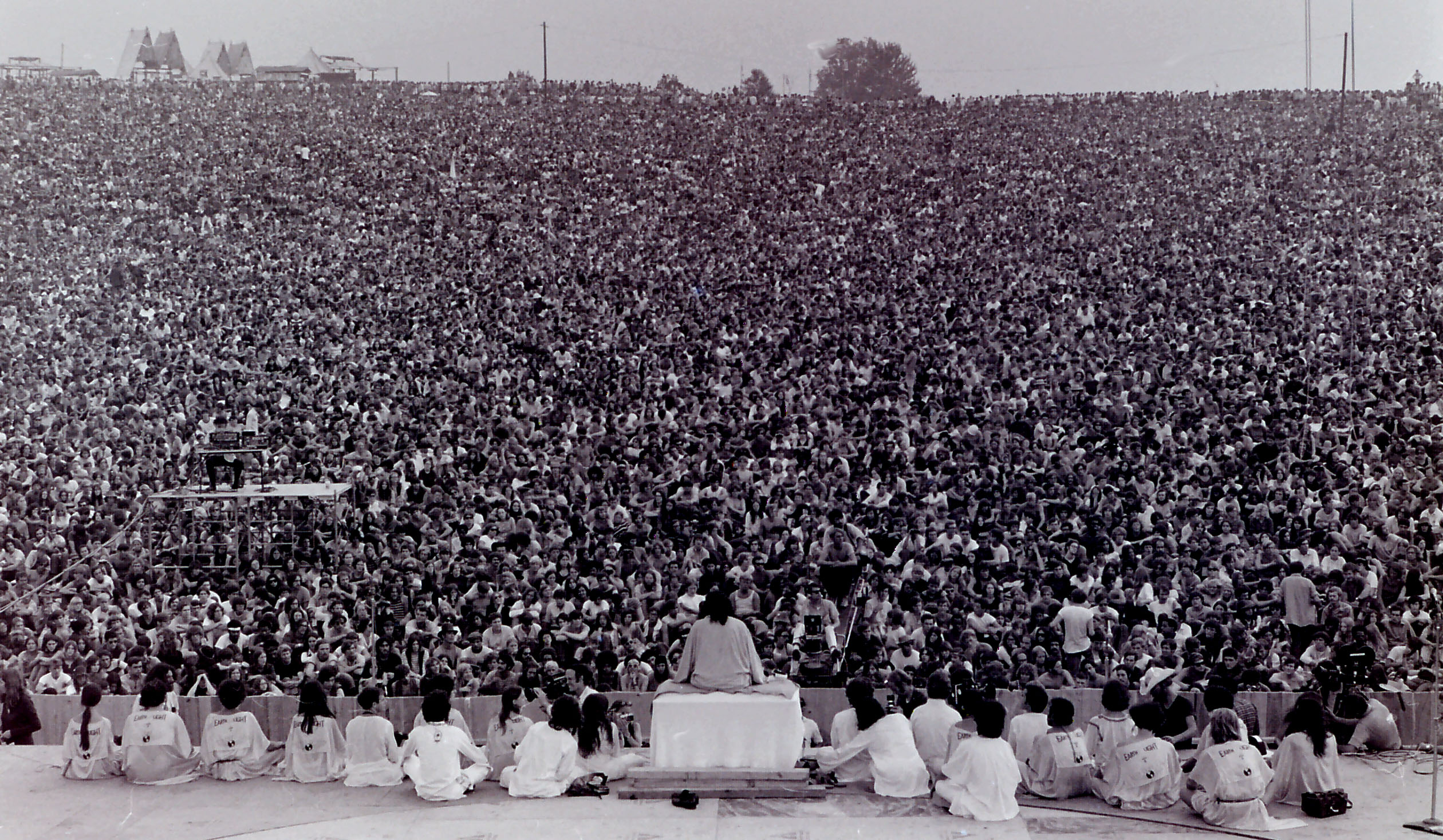
Swami Satchidananda opening the Woodstock Music and Art Festival

In 1966, the first Integral Yoga Institute was founded on the Upper West Side of New York City. There, Swami Satchidananda, and some of his newly trained students began leading classes for the general public in Hatha, meditation, breath work, and stress management. In August 1968, a group of students took up residence in an apartment in the 500 West End Avenue building to immerse themselves in the yogic lifestyle, forming the first Integral Yoga ashram.

Swami Satchidananda's students in New York planned and organized a public lecture on Integral Yoga for him to deliver at Carnegie Hall. There, a sold-out Hatha demonstration and lecture took place in January 1969. Later that year in August, he was invited to give the invocation at the opening of the Woodstock Music and Art Festival.

Soon after, Satchidananda's weekly lectures on Integral Yoga moved to the Universalist Church on Central Park West, as crowds became larger. Finally, in 1970, a large building in New York's West Village was purchased, which continues to be the site of the Integral Yoga Institute today. The members of the Institute opened New York's first vegetarian food store, Integral Yoga Natural Foods, in 1972. It remained the only all-vegetarian health food store in Manhattan until it closed January 2019.

More Integral Yoga Institutes, teaching centers, and ashrams opened in the late 1960s and early 1970s across America. In 1975, Integral Yoga established one of the first Yoga teacher training certification programs and, in 1999, joined with other US-based Yoga lineages to form the Yoga Alliance.

== Allegations of sexual misconduct ==
In 1991, protesters accused Swami Satchidananda of molesting his students. Two former disciples publicly claimed he used his spiritual authority to coerce them into a sexual relationship. Swami Satchidananda denied all claims of misconduct. None of the alleged victims filed criminal charges.

== Institutions ==
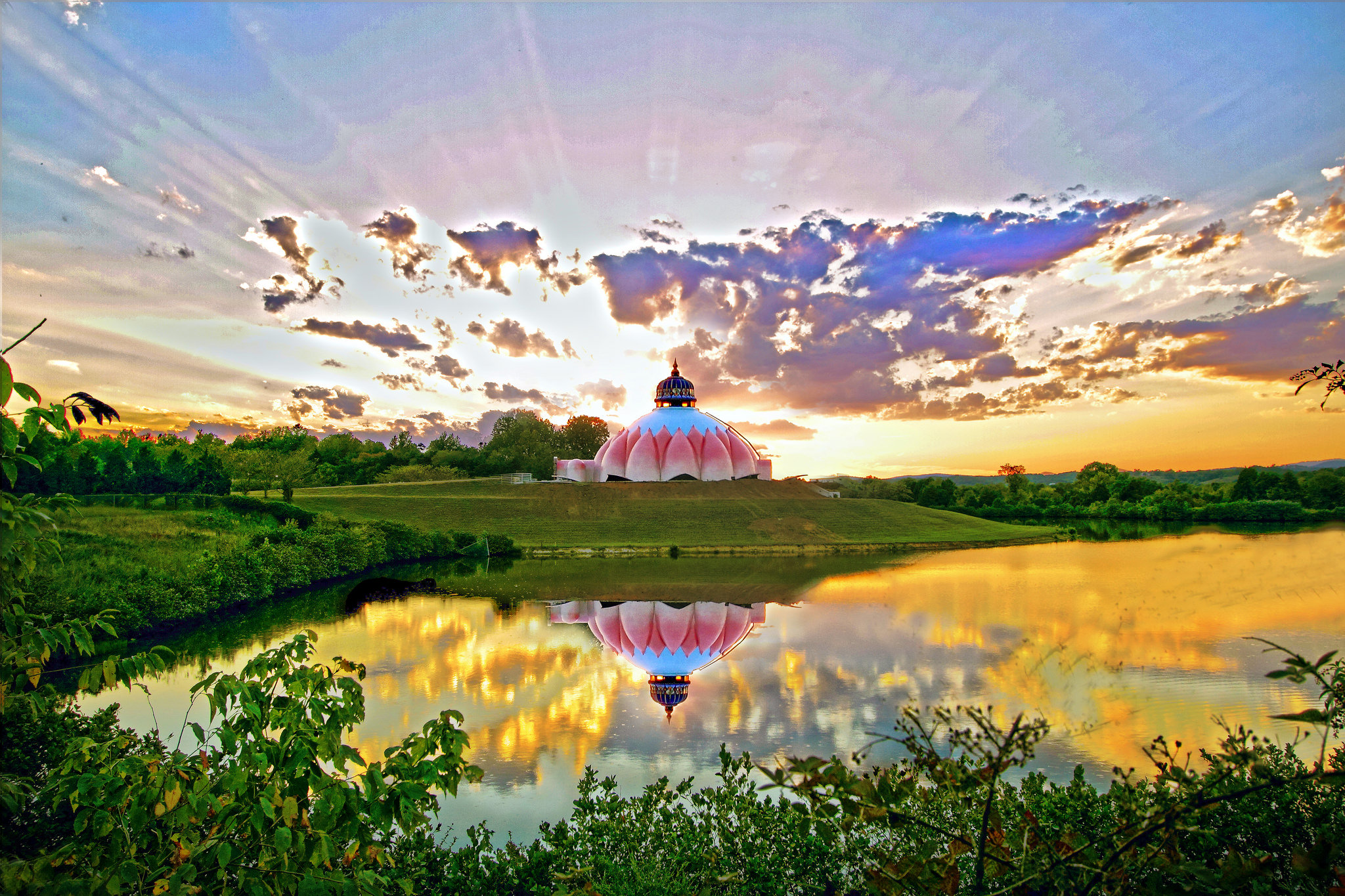
The LOTUS Shrine in Yogaville, VA at the Satchidananda Ashram—the headquarters of Integral Yoga

Integral Yoga Institutes and Centers exist on six continents. The international headquarters of Integral Yoga, Satchidananda Ashram–Yogaville, in Buckingham, Virginia, is a large community and programs center dedicated to Integral Yoga.

In 1972, many people attending programs at the Integral Yoga centers and institutes in America expressed interest in developing residential Yoga communities, or ashrams. Yogaville West, the first Satchidananda Ashram was located in Seigler Springs, California. In 1973, a second ashram opened in Pomfret, Connecticut, which became the headquarters for the Integral Yoga organization.

In 1980, due to severe winters, Swami Satchidananda closed the Connecticut ashram and moved the community to Buckingham, Virginia. Satchidananda Ashram–Yogaville, serves as Integral Yoga's world headquarters and is home to the Light Of Truth Universal Shrine (LOTUS). As of 2015, around 220 people lived permanently in Yogaville, and 2,000 to 3,000 guests were visiting each year. Yogaville operates as a residential spiritual community, Yoga retreat and programs center, and as a Yoga training center, offering teacher trainings, workshops, vegetarian cooking courses, and programs designed around the teachings of Integral Yoga.

In the grounds of Satchidananda Ashram—Yogaville is the Integral Yoga Academy. This is a training center that offers certification courses in Hatha Yoga and therapeutic Yoga, as well as continuing education courses for health care professionals. This academy operates year-round, offering residential programs that encourage students to immerse themselves in a "yogic lifestyle" based on the teachings of Integral Yoga.
