= 27th Venice International Film Festival =

Italian film festival in 1966

- Location: Venice, Italy
- Founded: 1932
- Awards: Golden Lion: The Battle of Algiers
- Festival date: 28 August – 10 September 1966
- Website: Website

Venice Film Festival chronology
- 28th 26th

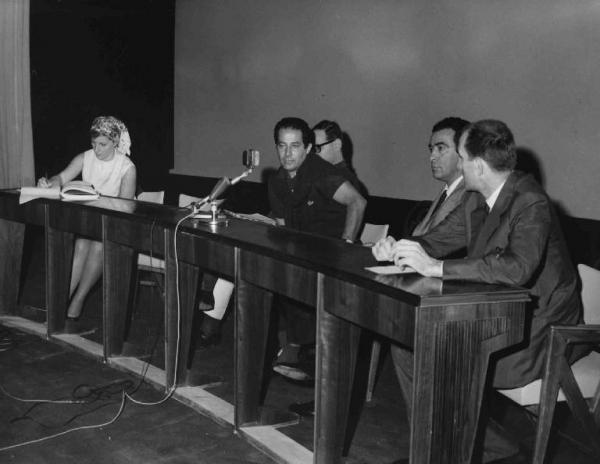
Director Gillo Pontecorvo at a press conference in the Venice International Film Festival

The 27th annual Venice International Film Festival was held from 28 August to 10 September 1966.

Italian writer Giorgio Bassani was the Jury President. The Golden Lion winner was The Battle of Algiers, directed by Gillo Pontecorvo.

== Jury ==
- Giorgio Bassani, Italian writer - Jury President
- Lindsay Anderson, British director and film critic
- Luboš Bartošek, Czechoslovak film historian
- Michel Butor, French writer and poet
- Joris Ivens, Dutch filmmaker
- Lewis Jacobs, American filmmaker
- Lev Kuleshov, Soviet filmmaker

== Official selection ==
The following films were selected to be screened:

=== In Competition ===
| English title | Original title | Director(s) | Production country |
|---|---|---|---|
| Almost a Man | Un uomo a metà | Vittorio De Seta | Italy |
| Au hasard Balthazar | | Robert Bresson | France |
| The Battle of Algiers | La battaglia di Algeri | Gillo Pontecorvo | Italy, Algeria |
| Chappaqua | | Conrad Rooks | United States |
| Les Créatures | | Agnès Varda | France |
| Fahrenheit 451 | | François Truffaut | France, United Kingdom |
| The First Teacher | Первый учитель | Andrey Konchalovskiy | Soviet Union |
| The Guest | Atithi | Tapan Sinha | India |
| The Game Is Over | La Curée | Roger Vadim | France, Italy |
| The Search | La Busca | Angelino Fons | Spain |
| Night Games | Nattlek | Mai Zetterling | Sweden |
| The Wild Angels | | Roger Corman | United States |
| Yesterday Girl | Abschied von gestern | Alexander Kluge | West Germany |

=== Out of Competition ===
| English title | Original title | Director(s) | Production country |
|---|---|---|---|
| The Big City | A Grande Cidade | Carlos Diegues | Brazil |
| Buster Keaton Rides Again | | John Spotton | Canada |
| Change of Life | Mudar de vida | Paulo Rocha | Portugal |
| The Climber | Sticenik | Vladan Slijepcevic | Yugoslavia |
| Courage for Every Day | Každý den odvahu | Evald Schorm | Czechoslovakia |
| Cul-de-sac | | Roman Polanski | United Kingdom |
| The Drifter | | Alex Matter | United Kingdom |
| The Face of Another | Tanin no kao | Hiroshi Teshigahara | Japan |
| Farewells | Het afscheid | Roland Verhavert | Netherlands |
| The Female Soldier | La soldadera | José Bolaños | Mexico |
| Francesco di Assisi | | Liliana Cavani | Italy |
| I Was Happy Here | | Desmond Davis | United Kingdom |
| The Taking of Power by Louis XIV | La prise de pouvoir par Louis XIV | Roberto Rossellini | France |

== Official Awards ==
=== Main Competition ===
- Golden Lion: The Battle of Algiers by Gillo Pontecorvo
- Special Jury Prize:
  - Yesterday Girl by Alexander Kluge
  - Chappaqua by Conrad Rooks
- Volpi Cup for Best Actor: Jacques Perrin for Un uomo a metà
- Volpi Cup for Best Actress: Natalya Arinbasarova for The First Teacher

== Independent Awards ==
=== FIPRESCI Prize ===
- The Battle of Algiers by Gillo Pontecorvo

=== OCIC Award ===
- Au hasard Balthazar by Robert Bresson
  - Honorable Mention: Yesterday Girl by Alexander Kluge
- Special Prize:
  - The War Game by Peter Watkins
  - Ha-Yeled Me'ever Lerechov by Yosef Shalhin

=== Lion of San Marco ===
- Memorandum by Donald Brittain and John Spotton
- Testa di rapa by Hermína Týrlová and Giancarlo Zagni
- Best Film about Adolescence: Ritzar bez bronya by Borislav Sharaliev
- Best Documentary: Le mistral by Joris Ivens
- Best Documentary - Television: Storm Signal by Robert Drew
- Grand Prize:
  - Hectorologie by Yves Plantin and Alain Blondel
  - Rodzina czlowiecza by Wladyslaw Slesicki
  - The Girl and the Bugler by Aleksandr Mitta

=== Plate 'Lion of San Marco' ===
- The Ivory Knife: Paul Jenkins at Work by Jules Engel
- Best Experimental Film: L'ultimo by Vittorio Armentano
- Best Sport Film: Hockey by Mica Milosevic
- Best Children's Film: The Kind-Hearted Ant by Aleksandar Marks & Vladimir Jutrisa
- Best Animated Film: Chromophobia by Raoul Servais
- Cultural and Educational Film: Comment savoir by Claude Jutra
- Film about Architecture: Helioplastika by Jaroslaw Brzozowski
- Plate:
  - The Animal Movie by Grant Munro and Ron Tunis
  - Jemima and Johnny by Lionel Ngakane
  - Physics and Chemistry of Water by Sarah Erulkar
  - Ptaci kohaci by Jirí Torman
  - Documentary - Contemporary Life/Social: Labanta negro by Piero Nelli
  - Recreative Children's Film: Little Mole, for the episode Krtek a raketa by Zdeněk Miler
  - Children's Film - Educative-Didactical: Alexander and a Car without the Left Headlight by Peter Fleischmann
- Honorary Diploma:
  - La fiaba di Tancredi by Velia Vergani
  - Tribunal by Herbert Seggelke
  - Willem de Kooning, the Painter by Paul Falkenberg and Hans Namuth
- Jury Hommage: Robert Bresson
- Award for best interpretation: Ritzar bez bronya by Oleg Kovachev
