= Fred Mayer (photographer) =

Swiss/German photographer (1933–2021)

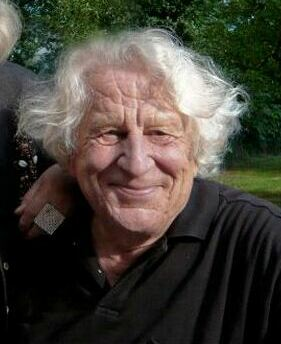
Fred Mayer

Fred Mayer (28 January 1933 – 25 November 2021) was a Swiss/German photographer. His works included photographs for several news agencies such as ATP, DPA, ADP, UPI and Magnum Photos, as well as various portfolios. He further published several books, many in cooperation with his wife, Ilse Günther.

== Private life ==
In 1956, Mayer married the Keystone-photographer Ilse Günther. She died on 5 October 2021.

== Career ==
Fred Mayer began his career in photography with an internship at Otto Pfeifer's studio. After his internship, Mayer started to work as an independent correspondent for Swiss magazines such as the Neue Zürcher Zeitung. In 1965, his collaboration with Magnum Photos started. For Magnum Photos, Mayer travelled to Indonesia, where he shot a documentation about the former President Sukarno. His other works included pictures of King Hussein of Jordania and portfolios from all around the world, from Vatican to Bali.

== Important works and achievements ==
Mayer and his wife published more than 30 books on a variety of topics. Kleinstaat und Weltkirche: Vatikan was published in 1979. Mayer later commented on the book by saying that he naively went to the Vatican and asked if he could take pictures. Being allowed to do so, he started to take pictures and later got published by the Swiss Orell Füssli Verlag. He further published books about various countries, the Russian orthodox church, Chakkar Polo, Japanese theatre and the Chinese Opera. In 2011, Mayer published Homage to Hermann Hesse and his Siddhartha, based on the novel Siddhartha by the German author Hermann Hesse. For this photographic essay, Mayer was nominated for the Best of ASMP Award 2011. He further received a Lifetime Award from SBF, the Swiss Professional Photographers and Photo Designers Society.
