= 9th Guldbagge Awards =

Swedish film awards ceremony

- Date: 29 October 1973
- Site: Grand Hotel, Stockholm, Sweden

Highlights
- Best Picture: Cries and Whispers

The 9th Guldbagge Awards ceremony, presented by the Swedish Film Institute, honored the best Swedish films of 1972 and 1973, and took place on 29 October 1973. Cries and Whispers directed by Ingmar Bergman was presented with the award for Best Film.

== Awards ==
- Best Film: Cries and Whispers by Ingmar Bergman
- Best Director: Johan Bergenstråhle for Foreigners
- Best Actor: Gösta Ekman for The Man Who Quit Smoking
- Best Actress: Harriet Andersson for Cries and Whispers
- Special Achievement: Sven Nykvist for Cries and Whispers
