= Sven Fagerberg =

Swedish novelist, essayist and engineer

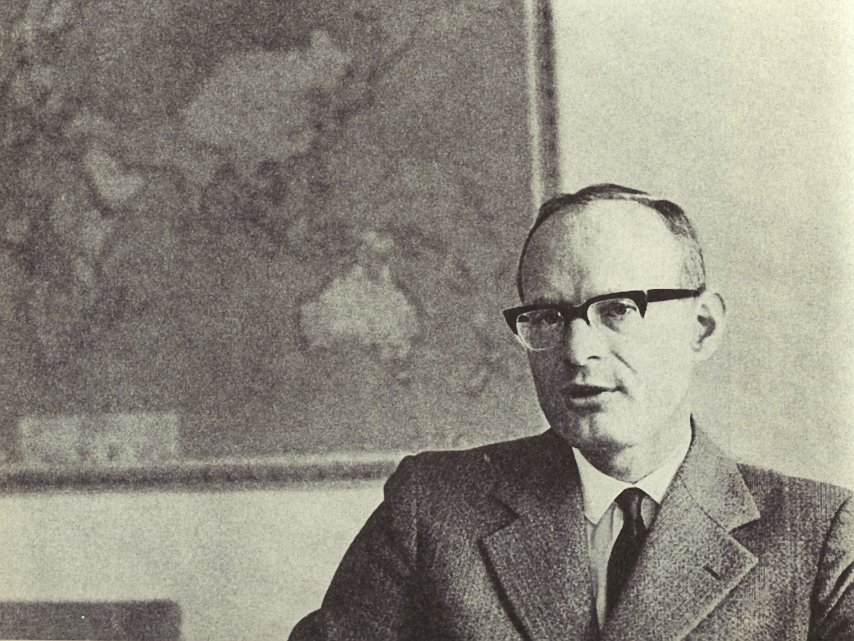
- Sven Fagerberg
- Born: Sven Gustaf Fagerberg; 17 December 1918; Nässjö, Sweden
- Died: 20 January 2006 (aged 87); Lund, Sweden
- Resting place: Anneforskyrkogården, Nässjö
- Education: Växjö högre allmänna läroverk 1937; Civil Engineer, KTH Royal Institute of Technology, 1943
- Occupations: Novelist; essayist; civil engineer; middle manager
- Employer: Electolux 1943–1965
- Notable work: Höknatt, Bronshästarna
- Spouse: Gunnel Lindberger
- Children: 2
- Awards: Dobloug Prize (1980)

Sven Gustaf Fagerberg (17 December 1918 – 20 January 2006) was a Swedish novelist, essayist, and engineer. He made his literary debut in 1957, with the novel Höknatt. Among his later novels are Svärdfäktarna from 1963 and De blindas rike from 1982. He was awarded the Dobloug Prize in 1980.

The central theme in Fagerberg's novels and essays was "the growing" or "growth" (det växande in Swedish). This theme included technical and economic innovation and entrepreneurial spirit (Fagerberg was a middle manager in Electrolux and was one of few Swedes on the cultural scene who had any knowledge of industrial leadership), but also the necessity for the individual to grow by listening to his or her unconscious mind.

Fagerberg was inspired by Greek mythology (interpreting gods and goddesses as voices from the unconscious), Zen Buddhism, and the psychology of Carl Gustav Jung. Throughout his authorship Fagerberg was involved in a dialogue with a few classics such as the Odyssey, Hamlet, and Ulysses, books that in his view best exemplified the process of development and growth.

In the 1950s and 1960s Fagerberg's novels mainly depicted outwardly successful people (often business leaders) seeking a balance between their lives in the modern economy and their inner lives. Free enterprise was seen as a liberating force by Fagerberg, but he was critical of the stifling effect that powerful business empires such as the Wallenberg dynasty had on society.

In the late 1960s and early 1970s, Fagerberg took up environmental issues and the threat industrialism poses to the process of growth in people as well as non‑human organisms. In the late 1970s and 1980s Fagerberg grew increasingly critical of the Swedish Social Democratic Party, especially its leader Olof Palme, the Swedish Trade Union Confederation, and the large Swedish public sector. He argued that a parasitic class of party officials, public sector managers, and left‑wing academics and journalists had emerged in Sweden, oppressing workers as well as entrepreneurs. The inefficient rule of this parasitic class had led to economic stagnation, Fagerberg said, and he argued that the most alarming symptom of the Social Democrats' stranglehold on the nation was the Employee funds, which were a step towards nationalization of private industry.

Sven Fagerberg was one of Sweden's most well‑known authors from the late 1950s to the 1980s. Social Democrat prime minister Tage Erlander as well as Conservative treasurer Gösta Bohman were influenced by his analysis of Swedish society. But the polemical tone of Fagerberg's books and articles in the 1980s has contributed to his waning popularity. Whilst Fagerberg's anti‑socialist critique has now become uncontroversial, his attacks on the Social Democrats and his simplistic neoliberalism did not make good literature. The consensus among Swedish critics is that Fagerberg is forgotten but his early books are worth reading.

Fagerberg also created a computer game called Det gäller livet, which was launched in 1993. He is buried at Anneforskyrkogården in Nässjö.

== Bibliography ==
=== Books ===
- Höknatt (1957)
- Kostymbalen (1961)
- Svärdfäktarna (1963)
- Det vitmålade hjärtat (1966, film 1969, Made in Sweden)
- Dialog i det fria (1968)
- Revolt inifrån (1969)
- Flickan inuti (under the pseudonym Francies Berglind)
- Resan till jorden (with Penny Fagerberg 1972)
- Bronshästarna (1973)
- Kassandra (with Madeleine von Heland 1976)
- Tal till Hermes (1977)
- Maud Gonne och myterna om kvinnan (1978)
- Det mänskliga uppdraget (1981)
- De blindas rike (1982)
- Los Angeles (1984)
- Friheten att älska (1986)
- Resan till landet där ingen blir gammal (1987)
- Beirut (1988)
- Ljuset är vår farkost (1989)
- Sankte Pers nattklubb (1990)
- Tänd alla dina lampor (1996)
- Som en tättings öga (1996)
- Pelagius (1998)
- Nya Kristina (2001)
- Persefone (2001)

=== Essays and articles ===
- "Finnegan och det öde landet" in Poesi, volume 3 number 1, 1950.
- Flickan i underjorden (1966)
- "Gå till din egen barm och knacka på" in Sju spådomar: 7 svenska författare spekulerar (1994)

=== Computer games ===
- Det gäller livet (1993)

=== Radio theater ===
- Flickan med ballongerna (Sveriges Radio P1 1986)

== Awards ==
- Boklotteriets stipendiat 1958
- BMF-plaketten 1966
- Litteraturfrämjandets stora pris 1975
- Honorary doctorate at University of Linköping 1977
- Dobloug Prize 1980
- Moderata samlingspartiets kulturpris 1984
- Östrabo Prize 1996
