= Siddhartha (novel) =

1922 novel by Hermann Hesse

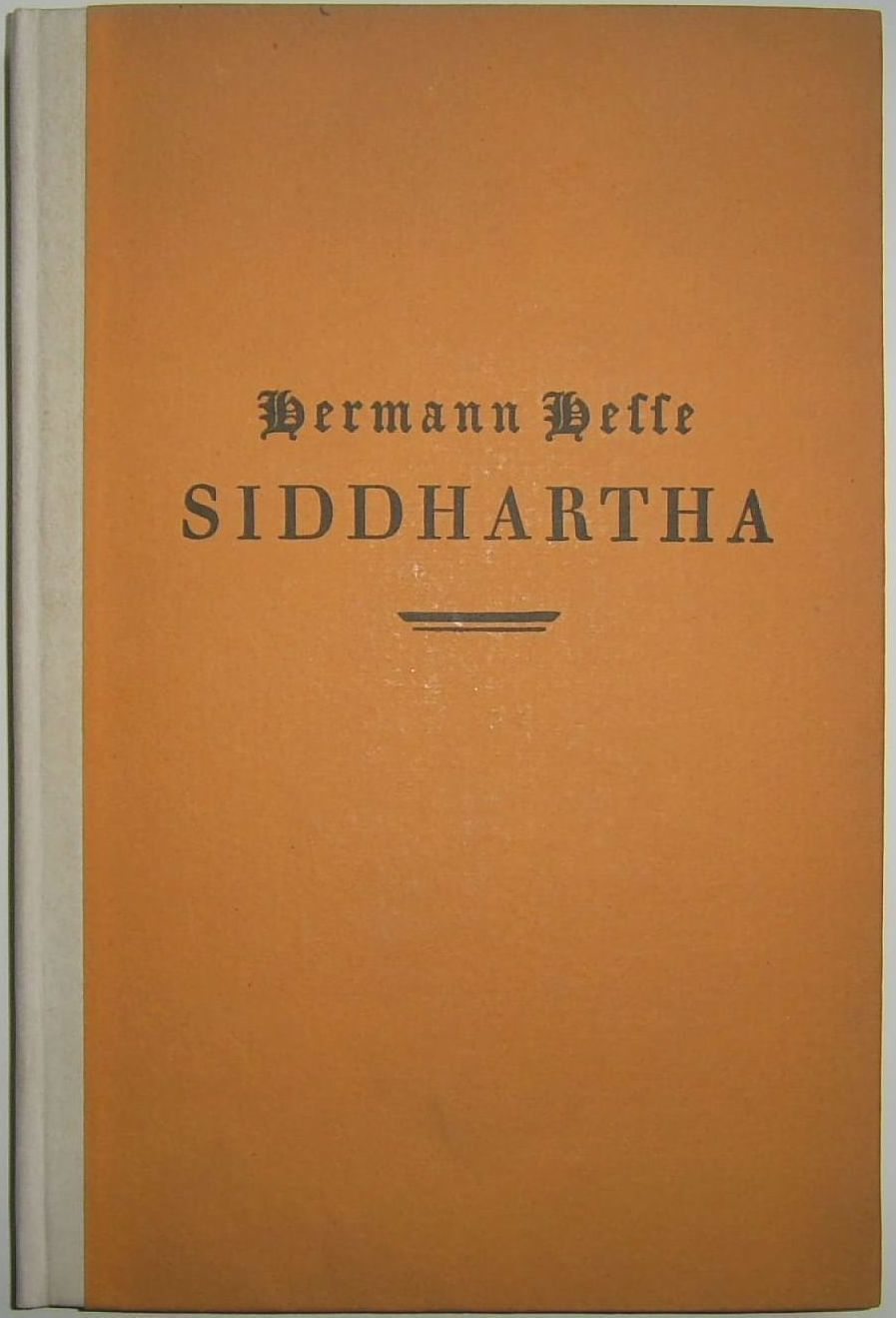
- First-edition cover
- Author: Hermann Hesse
- Original title: Siddhartha: Eine Indische Dichtung
- Language: German
- Genre: Philosophical fiction
- Publisher: S. Fischer Verlag
- Publication date: 1922, 1951 (U.S.), 1954 (UK)
- Publication place: Germany
- Pages: 152
- OCLC: 9766655
- Dewey Decimal: 833.912

Siddhartha: An Indian novel (German: Siddhartha. Eine indische Dichtung; German: [ziˈdaʁta]) is a novel authored by Hermann Hesse, originally written in the German language, and published in full in October 1922 (after earlier publication of Part One only in July 1921). Siddhartha is the fictional account of the spiritual journey of self-discovery of a man named Siddhartha during the time of the Gautama Buddha. The book was written in a simpler style than many of Hesse's other writings.

Hesse had completed Part One of Siddhartha in the early months of 1920, and published it independently in July, 1921. Hesse then went through a period of despondency and inward thought, feeling unable to resume work on the book again. Finally, in early 1922, he began work on Part Two, and by May, 1922, Hesse had completed the remaining eight chapters that compose Part Two. The entirety of the two-part book was finally published in October, 1922.

Hesse split the dedication section of Siddhartha, dedicating the first part of the novel to the French writer Romain Rolland and the second part of the novel to Wilhelm Gundert, his cousin.

Siddhartha was translated into other languages over the years before an English translation would come to exist. In fact, 1922's Siddhartha was not published in English until decades later, when it finally found a publisher in New Directions Publishing in the United States, in New York. This English translation of Hesse's 1922 Siddhartha was completed by Hilda Rosner, and was published in 1951. The paperback version of the Rosner translation was released in 1957, and it was this edition of Siddhartha that would eventually bring the novel to such prominence during the turbulent times of countercultural America in the 1960s.

The word Siddhartha is made up of two words in the Sanskrit language: siddha (achieved) + artha (what was searched for), which together means "he who has found meaning (of existence)" or "he who has attained his goals". In fact, the Buddha's own name before his renunciation was Siddhartha Gautama, prince of Kapilavastu. In this book, the Buddha is referred to as "Gotama", the Pali version of the Buddha's name.

Hermann Hesse wrote Siddhartha after he traveled to India in the 1910s.

== Plot ==
The story takes place in ancient India, where Siddhartha, the handsome son of a Brahmin, decides to leave his home in the hope of gaining spiritual illumination by becoming an ascetic Samana. Joined by his best friend, named Govinda, they eventually meet the Samanas:

"In the evening of this day they caught up with the ascetics, the skinny Samanas, and offered them their companionship and—obedience. They were accepted."

Siddhartha fasts, becomes homeless, renounces all personal possessions, and intensely meditates:

"Siddhartha gave his garments to a poor Brahman in the street. He wore nothing more than the loincloth and the earth-coloured, unsown cloak. He ate only once a day, and never something cooked. He fasted for fifteen days. He fasted for twenty-eight days. The flesh waned from his thighs and cheeks. Feverish dreams flickered from his enlarged eyes, long nails grew slowly on his parched fingers and a dry, shaggy beard grew on his chin. His glance turned to icy when he encountered women; his mouth twitched with contempt, when he walked through a city of nicely dressed people. He saw merchants trading, princes hunting, mourners wailing for their dead, whores offering themselves, physicians trying to help the sick, priests determining the most suitable day for seeding, lovers loving, mothers nursing their children—and all of this was not worthy of one look from his eye, it all lied, it all stank, it all stank of lies, it all pretended to be meaningful and joyful and beautiful, and it all was just concealed putrefaction. The world tasted bitter. Life was torture."

"A goal stood before Siddhartha, a single goal: to become empty, empty of thirst, empty of wishing, empty of dreams, empty of joy and sorrow. Dead to himself, not to be a self any more, to find tranquility with an emptied heard, to be open to miracles in unselfish thoughts, that was his goal. Once all of my self was overcome and had died, once every desire and every urge was silent in the heart, then the ultimate part of me had to awake, the innermost of my being, which is no longer my self, the great secret."

Eventually, the pair seek out more options and end up personally speaking with the enlightened Gautama, who is referred to as Gotama in the book.

After their encounter with the Buddha, Govinda decides to join the Buddha's order but Siddhartha does not, insisting that it is not going to help him attain his goal. For him, the Buddhist philosophy, though supremely wise, must be individually realized independently of instruction by a teacher.

"I am deprived by the Buddha, thought Siddhartha, I am deprived, and even more he has given to me. He has deprived me of my friend, the one who had believed in me and now believes in him, who had been my shadow and is now Gotama’s shadow. But he has given me Siddhartha, myself..."

Siddhartha then resolves to carry on his quest for enlightenment alone.

Eventually, the extremely destitute Siddhartha is granted passage to cross a river by a ferryman. The ferryman, whom Siddhartha is unable to pay, predicts that Siddhartha will return later to compensate him in some way.

Venturing onward toward city life, Siddhartha encounters the courtesan Kamala, the most beautiful woman Siddhartha has ever laid eyes on. She notes Siddhartha's handsome appearance and fast wit, but warns him that he must become wealthy to win her affections, so that she may teach him the art of love. Although Siddhartha despised materialistic pursuits as a Samana, he agrees now to Kamala's suggestion.

She directs him to the employ of Kamaswami, a local businessman, and insists that he have Kamaswami treat him as an equal rather than an underling. Siddhartha easily succeeds, providing a voice of patience and tranquility against Kamaswami's fits of passion - a skill which Siddhartha learned from his days as an ascetic. And so, Siddhartha ends up becoming a rich man with the tutelage of the fiery Kamaswami, while losing himself in passion as Kamala's lover.

After some time living in this manner, he realizes that he has fallen into vicious cycles of gambling and indulgence, and that he is lacking all spiritual fulfilment. Leaving the bustle of the city, Siddhartha returns to the river, disillusioned, and contemplates suicide. Falling into a meditative sleep, he is saved only by an internal experience of the holy word, Om.

The next morning, Siddhartha briefly reconnects with Govinda, who is passing through the area as a wandering Buddhist monk.

Siddhartha decides to live the rest of his life in the presence of the spiritually inspirational river, becoming a companion of Vasudeva (the elderly ferryman from earlier in the story), with whom he begins a humbler way of life. Although Vasudeva is a simple man, he appears to possess spiritual insight, and relates that the river has many voices and significant messages to divulge to any who might listen.

Some years later, Kamala, now a Buddhist convert, is traveling to see the Buddha on his deathbed, accompanied by her reluctant young son, when she is bitten by a venomous snake near the river bank. Siddhartha recognizes her and she informs him that the boy is his own son. After Kamala's death, Siddhartha attempts to console and raise the furiously resistant boy, until one day the child flees altogether. Although Siddhartha is desperate to follow the runaway, Vasudeva urges him to let the boy find his own path, just as Siddhartha did himself in his youth. Listening to the river with Vasudeva, Siddhartha realizes that time is an illusion and that all of his feelings and experiences, even those of suffering, are part of a great and ultimately jubilant fellowship of all things connected in the cyclical unity of nature. After Siddhartha's moment of illumination, Vasudeva claims that his work is done and he must depart into the woods, leaving Siddhartha peacefully fulfilled and alone once more.

Toward the end of his life, Govinda hears about an enlightened ferryman and travels to Siddhartha, not initially recognizing him as his old childhood companion.Govinda asks the now-elderly Siddhartha to relate his wisdom and Siddhartha replies that for every true statement there is an opposite one that is also true; that language and the confines of time lead people to adhere to one fixed belief that does not account for the fullness of the truth. Because nature works in a self-sustaining cycle, every entity carries in it the potential for its opposite and so the world must always be considered complete. Siddhartha simply urges people to identify and love the world in its completeness. He then requests the puzzled Govinda to kiss his forehead; when he does so, Govinda experiences the same visions of timelessness that Siddhartha himself saw with Vasudeva by the river. Govinda then bows to his wise and radiantly smiling friend.

== Major themes ==
In Hesse's novel, experience, the totality of conscious events of a human life, is shown as the best way to approach understanding of reality and attain enlightenment—Hesse's crafting of Siddhartha's journey shows that understanding is attained not through intellectual methods, nor through immersing oneself in the carnal pleasures of the world and the accompanying pain of samsara; rather, it is the completeness of these experiences that allows Siddhartha to attain understanding.

Thus, individual events are meaningless when considered by themselves—Siddhartha's stay with the Samanas and his immersion in the worlds of love and business do not ipso facto lead to nirvana, yet they cannot be considered distractions, for every action and event gives Siddhartha experience, which in turn leads to understanding.

A major preoccupation of Hesse in writing Siddhartha was to cure his "sickness with life" (Lebenskrankheit) by immersing himself in Indian philosophy such as that expounded in the Upanishads and the Bhagavad Gita. The reason the second half of the book took so long to write was that Hesse "had not experienced that transcendental state of unity to which Siddhartha aspires. In an attempt to do so, Hesse lived as a virtual semi-recluse and became totally immersed in the sacred teachings of both Hindu and Buddhist scriptures. His intention was to attain to that 'completeness' which, in the novel, is the Buddha's badge of distinction." The novel is structured on three of the traditional stages of life for Hindu males (student (brahmacharin), householder (grihastha) and recluse/renunciate (vanaprastha) as well as the Buddha's Four Noble Truths (Part One) and Eightfold Path (Part Two) which form twelve chapters, the number in the novel.

Ralph Freedman mentions how Hesse commented in a letter "[my] Siddhartha does not, in the end, learn true wisdom from any teacher, but from a river that roars in a funny way and from a kindly old fool who always smiles and is secretly a saint." In a lecture about Siddhartha, Hesse claimed "Buddha's way to salvation has often been criticized and doubted, because it is thought to be wholly grounded in cognition. True, but it's not just intellectual cognition, not just learning and knowing, but spiritual experience that can be earned only through strict discipline in a selfless life". Freedman also points out how Siddhartha described Hesse's interior dialectic: "All of the contrasting poles of his life were sharply etched: the restless departures and the search for stillness at home; the diversity of experience and the harmony of a unifying spirit; the security of religious dogma and the anxiety of freedom." Eberhard Ostermann has shown how Hesse, while mixing the religious genre of the legend with that of the modern novel, seeks to reconcile with the double-edged effects of modernization such as individualization, pluralism or self-disciplining. The character Siddhartha honors the character Gotama (Gautama Buddha) by not following him in person, but by following Gotama's example.

== Cultural reinterpretations ==
A film adaptation of the novel was released as Siddhartha; premiering in France in September 1972, it was directed by Conrad Rooks (1934-2011), starred Shashi Kapoor (1938-2017), featured cinematography by Sven Nyqvist (1922-2006), and was released by Columbia Pictures in America in July 1973.

Classical musical compositions based on the novel have included Claude Vivier's symphonic poem, Siddhartha (1976).

Siddhartha inspired Pete Townshend's song "The Ferryman", written for an amateur dramatisation of Siddhartha at the Meher Baba Oceanic Center in Twickenham, West London, in June 1976. In September 1978, he recorded The Ferryman, which he released on the record label Another Scoop in 1989.

Townshend's wife Rachel Fuller composed a 'literary and musical reinvention' of the novel Siddhartha by 2024, titled "The Seeker", starring Townshend the ferryman.

Earlier, in 2015, Joel Puckett composed a piece for wind ensemble titled "That Secret from the River", based on the Ferryman's words from the book: "Have you also learned that secret from the river; that there is no such thing as time? That the river is everywhere at the same time, at the source and at the mouth, at the waterfall, at the ferry, at the current, in the ocean and in the mountains, everywhere and that the present only exists for it, not the shadow of the past nor the shadow of the future."

There was also an Indian-themed photographic essay by Fred Mayer, published in 2011, under the title "Homage to Hermann Hesse and His Siddhartha".
