= Zina Rachevsky =

Russian-born French-American socialite (1930–1973)

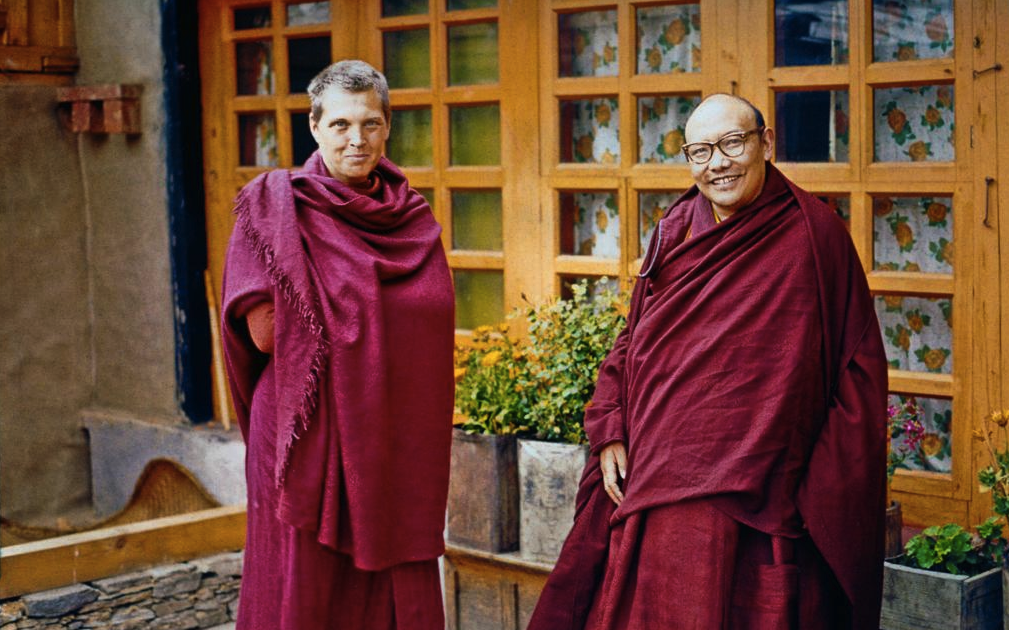
- Zina Rachevsky and Trulshik Rinpoche in 1972
- Born: September 1, 1930; New York City, US
- Died: October 20, 1973 (aged 43); Nepal
- Spouse: Conrad Rooks

Zina Rachevsky, also Zenaïde Rachewski or Zina Rachewsky (Russian: Зинаида Владимировна Рашевская; 1 September 1930 – 20 August 1973) was a Russian-born French-American socialite, film actress, and Gelug Tibetan Buddhist nun. Her Buddhist name is Thubten Changchub Palmo.

== Biography ==
Zina Rachevsky was born on 1 September 1930 to an American mother of German-Jewish descent and a Russian emigrant Vladimir Rachevski, the son of Sergei Rachevski, a Russian colonel killed at Port Arthur in 1904. She was born in New York City at the Ambassador Hotel, owned by SW Straus & Co. Zina's mother, Harriet Straus Rachevsky, was the daughter of American millionaire Simon W. Straus, for whom the company was named. Vladimir Rachevski was the brother of Zinaida Rachevskaya, who had married the exiled Grand Duke Boris Vladimirovich of Russia.

Zina would spend her childhood in France, living through the Second World War and married on 4 November 1948 French aristocrat Count Bernard d'Harcourt (1925-1958) whom she divorced in 1950, then moving to the United States of America.

While in Hollywood, Rachevsky took a course in drama and theater.
