= Yogaville =

Swami Satchidananda ashram in Virginia

Coordinates: 37°39′56.9″N 78°41′8″W

Satchidananda Ashram-Yogaville
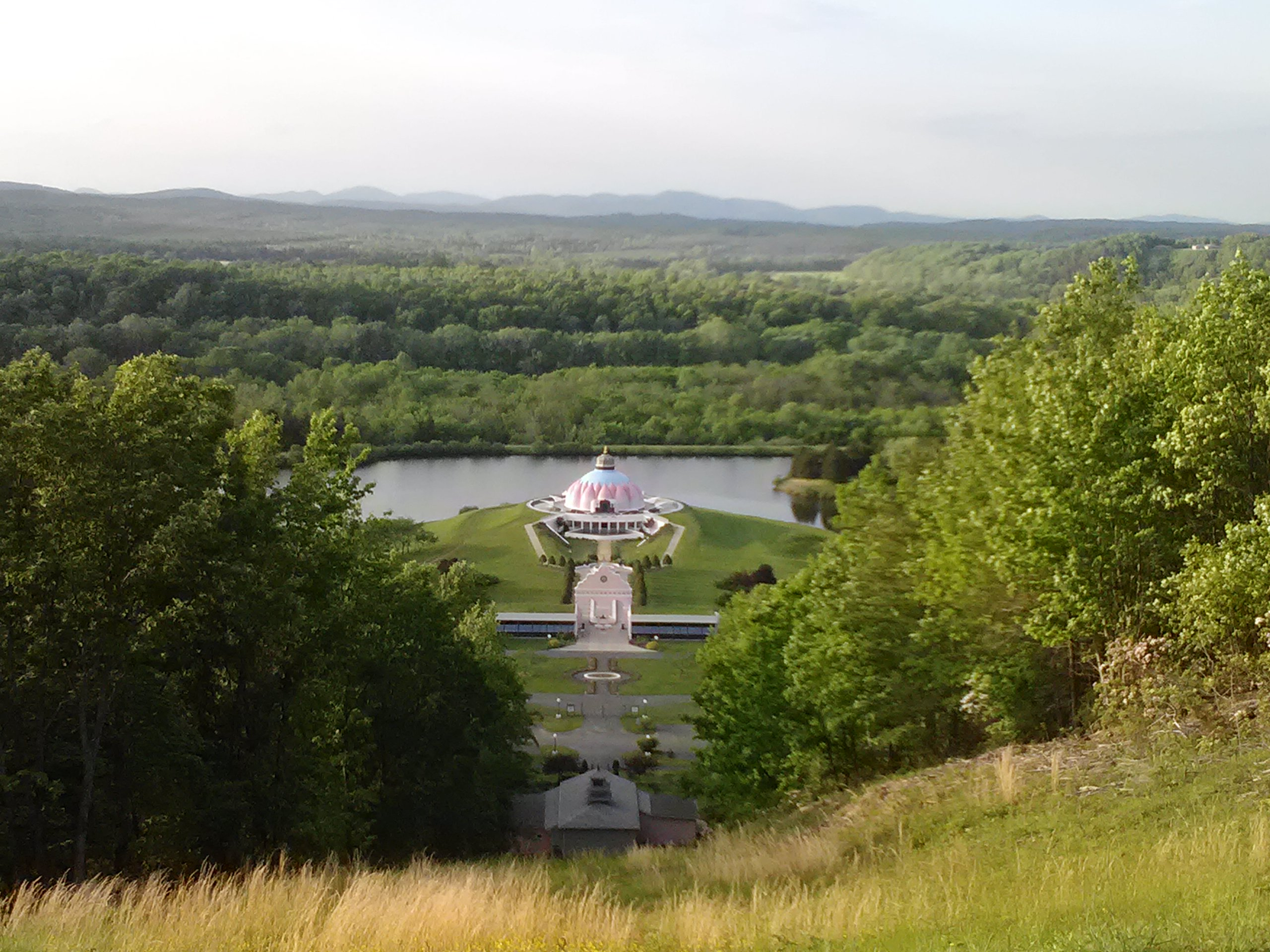
- Type: Ashram
- Purpose: To disseminate the teachings of H.H. Sri Swami Satchidananda
- Headquarters: Satchidananda Ashram-Yogaville Virginia
- Location: Buckingham County, Virginia
- Affiliations: Sivananda Ashram
- Website: yogaville.org

Yogaville, or Satchidananda Ashram, is the Buckingham County, Virginia, headquarters of Satchidananda Saraswati's organization.

== Ashram ==
The ashram was founded in 1980 by Satchidananda Saraswati, whose western notability stems from his opening of the Woodstock festival. The ashram is the international organizational headquarters of Swami Satchidananda's documented teachings. It is located in Buckingham County, Virginia. The primary goal of guru Yogiraj Sri Swami Satchidananda (1914-2002) was interfaith understanding as a vehicle to world peace. To this end, the LOTUS (Light Of Truth Universal Shrine) was constructed and inaugurated in 1986. Swami Satchidananda had been living in Yogaville, though he was visiting Madras, in South India at the time of his death.

The property in rural Virginia, along the James River, was identified for the community from the air as the swami flew over, looking for land farther south than his ashram in Pomfret, Connecticut. Swami Satchidananda acquired 600 acres in 1979 to form his town, financing it by selling property in Falls Village, Connecticut that had been given to him by Carole King. As of 1986, when the LOTUS was dedicated, around 120 people were living on a total of 750 acres. Reports cited plans to eventually house a population between 600 and 1,000. The ashram in Yogaville maintains a large kitchen and dining room for residents and guests. A 1996 book of favorite ashram recipes has had nine editions. According to the official website, there are around 200 residents as of 2015. In addition to the Virginia and Connecticut ashrams, Yogaville-West was founded in Seigler Springs, California in 1972.

== LOTUS ==
Costing $2 million (financed through donations and tithes) and dedicated on July 20, 1986, the shrine is the centerpiece of Yogaville. The structure gets its name because it is shaped like a lotus flower and also stands for Light Of Truth Universal Shrine. The structure features a gold-leaf dome, and houses 12 altars representing Christian, Jewish, Hindu, Shinto, Tao, Buddhist, Islam, Sikh, Native American, and African religions. Blue neon tubes extend from each altar up along the spines of the vaulted ceiling.
