= Foreigners (film) =

1972 film

- Directed by: Johan Bergenstråhle
- Written by: Johan Bergenstråhle; Theodor Kallifatides
- Starring: Maria Antipa
- Cinematography: Petter Davidson
- Release date: 4 September 1972
- Running time: 113 minutes
- Country: Sweden
- Language: Swedish

Foreigners (Swedish: Jag heter Stelios) is a 1972 Swedish drama film directed by Johan Bergenstråhle, who also wrote the screenplay together with Theodor Kallifatides. The film won Bergenstråhle the award for Best Director at the 9th Guldbagge Awards. The working title of the film was Kocksgatan 48.

== Cast ==
- Maria Antipa as Maria
- Andreas Bellis as Dimitris
- Edith Jansson as Housewife
- Mårten Larsson as Chef
- Harriette Lindered as Waitress
- Gisela Louhimo as Waitress
- Anastasios Margetis as Tomas
- Helena Olofsson-Carmback (as Helena Olofsson)
- Konstantinos Papageorgiou as Stelios
- Despina Tomazani as Despina
- Savas Tzanetakis as Kostas
