= Shanti Hiranand =

Indian vocalist (1932–2020)

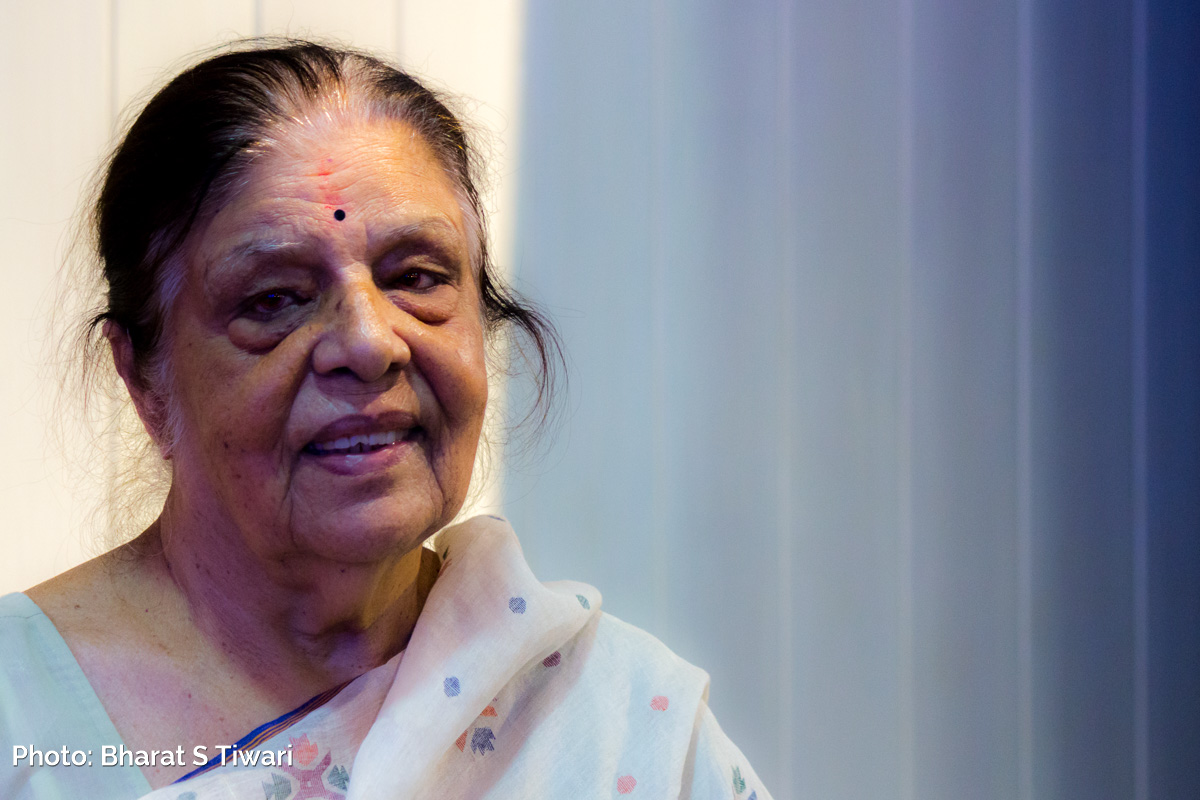
- Shanti Hiranand
- Born: 1932; Lucknow, British India
- Died: April 10, 2020 (aged 87); Gurugram, India
- Known for: Hindustani music
- Awards: Padma Shri (2007)

Shanti Hiranand (Hindi : शान्ती हीरानंद) (1932 – 10 April 2020) was an Indian vocalist, classical musician and writer, known for her proficiency as a ghazal singer. She was the author of the book Begum Akhtar: The Story of My Ammi, a biographical work on Begum Akhtar, a renowned Ghazal singer.

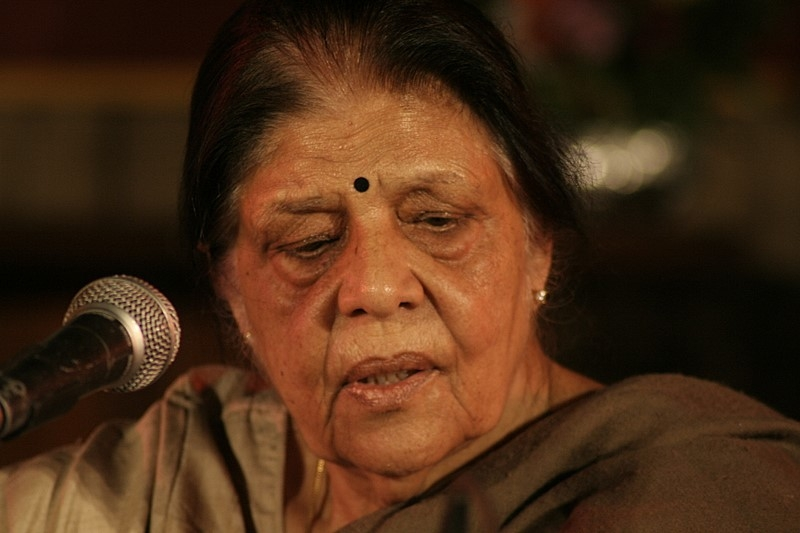

== Biography ==
Born in 1933 in a Sindhi business family based in Lucknow (now in the Indian state of Uttar Pradesh), Shanti Hiranand studied at the Bhatkhande Music Institute, when her father had relocated his business in 1940s. She also pursued a Bachelor of Arts degree from the University of Lucknow.

Her debut music performance was on All India Radio Lahore in 1947 and she continued her music training in Lucknow, under the tutelage of Ustad Aijaz Hussain Khan of Rampur, when her family returned to India after the partition of India in 1947. In 1952, an official at a radio station suggested her to train under Begum Akhtar. In 1957, she started training in thumri, dadra and ghazal singing under Begum Akhtar and the relationship continued till Akhtar's death in 1974; the story of the relationship is documented in Hiranand's book on Akhtar, Begum Akhtar: The Story of My Ammi, published in 2005.

The Government of India awarded her its fourth highest civilian honour, the Padma Shri, in 2007, for her contributions to Hindustani music. Some of her renditions have been compiled and brought out as an audio CD, Expressions of Love by Music Today. She lived in Lucknow and was associated with the efforts of Begum Akhtar Admirer's Group (BAAG Trust) in converting Akhtar's house in Lucknow into a museum in memory of the singer. She taught music at Triveni Kala Sangam, Delhi in her last decades.

Shanti Hiranand died on 10 April 2020 in Gurugram, India.

== Bibliography ==
- Shanti Hiranand (2005). Begum Akhtar: The Story of My Ammi. Viva Books. p. 200. ISBN 978-8130901725.

== See also ==
- Begum Akhtar
