= Johan Bergenstråhle (director) =

Swedish film director

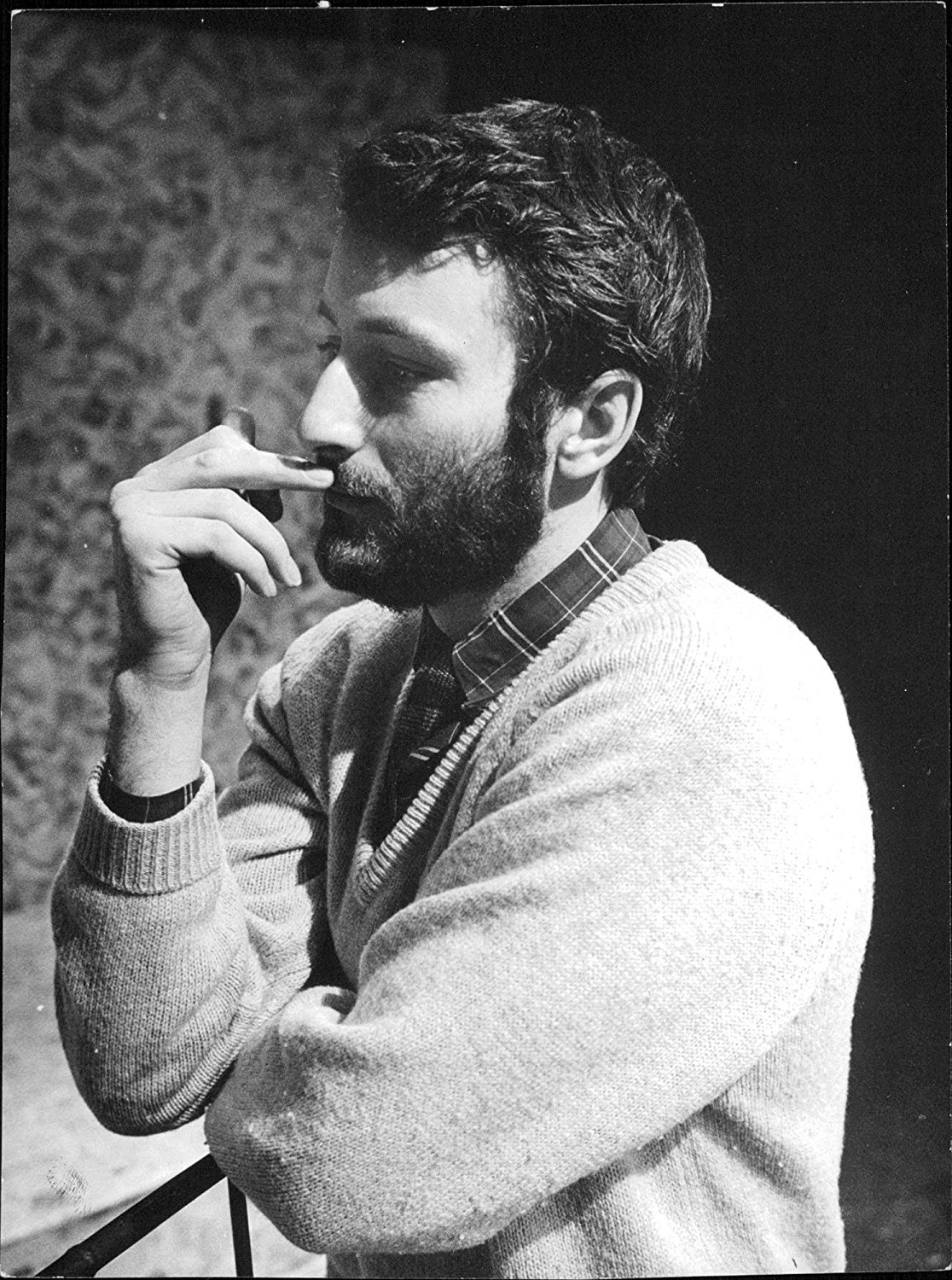
- Bergenstrahle in 1966
- Born: Lars Johan Rudman Bergenstråhle; 15 July 1935; Stockholm, Sweden
- Died: 23 August 1995 (aged 60); Stockholm, Sweden
- Occupations: Film director, screenwriter
- Years active: 1965-1994

Lars Johan Rudman Bergenstråhle (/bɛərɡənˈʃtrɔːlə/; Swedish: [bærˈɡɛnˌstrɔːlə]; 10 February 1935 – 15 July 2007) was a Swedish film director and screenwriter. He directed 14 films between 1965 and 1994. His 1969 film Made in Sweden was entered into the 19th Berlin International Film Festival, where it won a Silver Bear award. His 1972 film Foreigners won the award for Best Director at the 9th Guldbagge Awards.

He was married to the painter and film director Marie-Louise Ekman from 1971 to 1980.

== Selected filmography ==
- Made in Sweden (1969)
- A Baltic Tragedy (1970)
- Foreigners (1972)
- Hello Baby (1976)
