= Gunnar Arvidson =

Swedish journalist and writer (1924–2003)

Gunnar Samuel Arvidson (22 April 1924 – 7 February 2003) was a Swedish journalist, presenter, and writer.

== Biography ==
Arvidson was born in Vasastan, Stockholm.

In the 1980s, Arvidson lived in Sundsvall and became a TV host through his hosting of Café Sundsvall. He directed programs such as Mitt i naturen, Sommar i parken, and Läslustan. He also featured in other programs, including Sveriges magasin from 1973 to 1978, Mitt i middan from 1981 to 1989, and for TV3, he made the media magazine Stoppa pressarna in 1989.

After retirement, he continued to write, notably for the magazine Jury, among other publications. In two consecutive years, 1986 and 1987, Aftonbladet's readers named him Swedish male TV personality of the year.

== Bibliography ==
- Arvidson's Mix (1989)
- What Happens at the Castle (1991)
- Do Not Disturb – I'm Reading (2001)
