= Swami Satchidananda Saraswati =

Indian religious teacher (1914–2022)

Swami Satchidananda
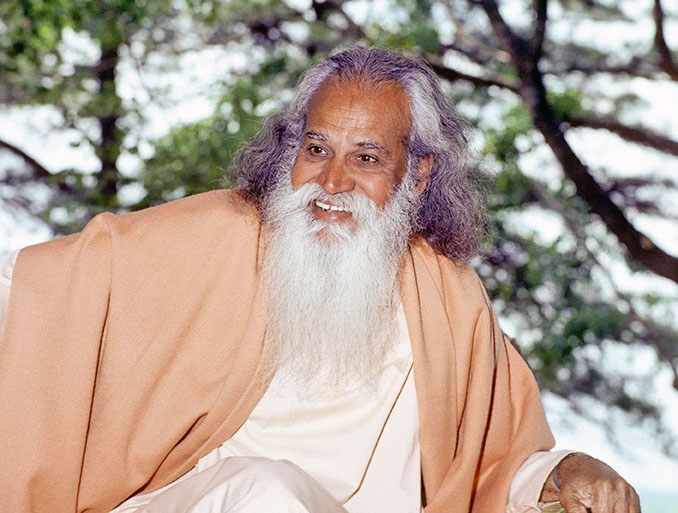
- Satchidananda giving an informal talk to students in Yogaville (1982)

Personal life
- Born: C. K. Ramaswamy Gounder; 22 December 1914 Chettipalayam, Coimbatore, Tamil Nadu, British India
- Died: 19 August 2002 (aged 87) Chennai, Tamil Nadu, India
- Resting place: Yogaville, Buckingham, Virginia
- Honors: U Thant Peace Award; Juliet Hollister Award

Religious life
- Religion: Hinduism, Interfaith universalism
- Order: Saraswati order
- Institute: Integral Yoga Institute
- Church: Integral Yoga Ministry
- Philosophy: Integral Yoga
- Lineage: Sivananda

Satchidananda Saraswati (IAST: Saccidānanda Sarasvatī; 22 December 1914 – 19 August 2002), born C. K. Ramaswamy Gounder and known as Swami Satchidananda, was an Indian yoga guru and religious teacher, who gained following in the West. He founded his own brand of Integral Yoga, and its Yogaville headquarters in Virginia. He was the author of philosophical and spiritual books and had a core of founding disciples who compiled his translations and updated commentaries on traditional handbooks of yoga such as the Yoga Sutras of Patanjali and the Bhagavad Gita for modern readers.

== Early life and education ==
Satchidananda Saraswati was born C. K. Ramaswamy Gounder on 22 December 1914, in Chettipalayam, a suburb of Coimbatore city in Tamil Nadu, India to "a family of wealthy landowners".

According to his authorized biography (published by his existing U.S. organization, Integral Yoga), his father, Sri Kalyanasundaram was a landowner and poet; his mother, Srimati Velammai was spiritual. It further states that his parents called him Ramu, that their home was a meeting place for poets, musicians, and philosophers, that wandering ascetics and holy men received free food and lodging at their home, and that their presence influenced Satchidananda. He studied at an agricultural college.

== Early career pursuits and marriage ==
Satchidananda began working in his family's automobile import business, learning how to weld. At age 23, he became a manager at India's National Electric Works. He was a temporary manager of Perur Temple, and met his wife there. He married and had two sons; his wife died suddenly 5 years into their marriage.

== Spiritual pursuits ==
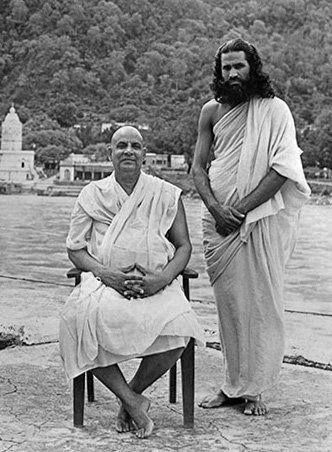
Satchidananda (standing) with his Guru, Sivananda Saraswati, Rishikesh, India, 1951

After the death of his wife, Ramaswamy travelled throughout India, meditating at shrines and studying with spiritual teachers including a brief period with Sri Aurobindo. He was initiated into pre-sannyasa in the Ramakrishna Thapovanam and given the name Sambasiva Chaitanya. While at the ashram, he cared for orphaned young boys and studied along with Ramana Maharshi. He left the Sri Ramana Ashram when he could not bear the suffering of Ramana's arm cancer and treatment procedures. He travelled to Rishikesh, a town in the foothills of the Himalayas on the banks of the Ganges. There, he discovered his guru, Sivananda Saraswati, founder of the Divine Life Society, who ordained him into the sannyasa in 1949 and gave him the name Swami Satchidananda Saraswati. The name Satcitananda (Sanskrit: Saccidānanda) is a compound of three Sanskrit words, sat, cit and ānanda, meaning essence, consciousness and bliss, respectively. The expression describes the nature of Brahman. In all, he studied under Sivananda for 17 years. Along with Vishnudevananda, he became one of Sivananda's known missionaries.

During the early 1950s and into the 1960s, Satchidananda and his fellow Sivananda devotee Satchidananda Saraswati Mataji jointly headed the Trincomalee Thapovanam, one of Sivananda's ashrams in the hill country of Sri Lanka. In October 1955, his devotees opened Satchidananda Thapovanam in Kandy. Here, Satchidananda taught yoga, conceived and implemented interfaith approaches to traditional Hindu festivals, and modernised the ancient mode of living that renunciates had followed for many years. For instance, he drove a car to teach throughout Sri Lanka, wore a watch to be on time, and engaged the questions of seekers. These modernisations were ridiculed by some in the orthodoxy, but he felt the changes to be necessary natural extensions and serving tools for betterment in his spiritual yogic work. He loved flying airplanes and helicopters.

== Coming to America and Woodstock ==
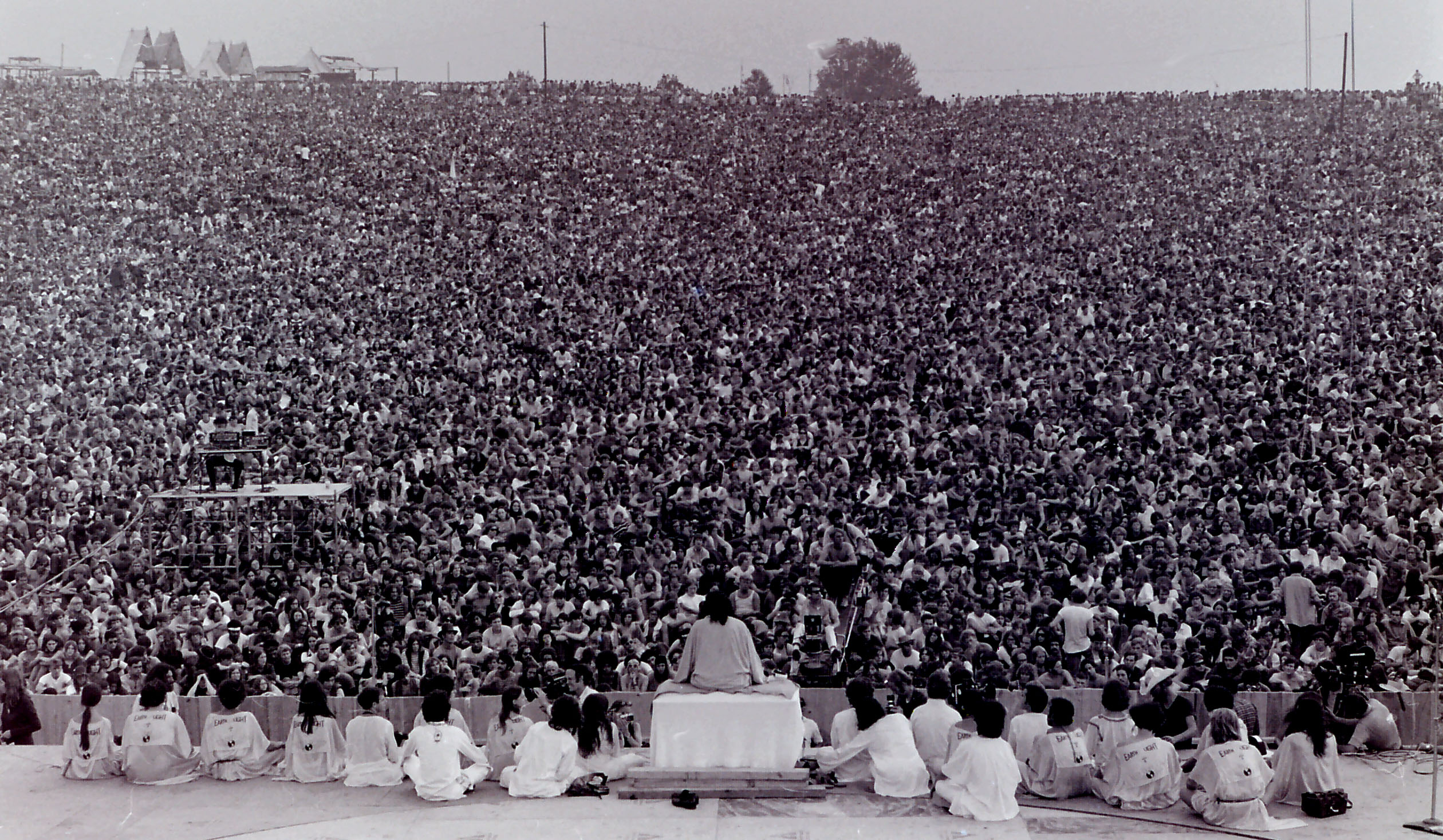
Swami Satchidananda on stage as he opens the 1969 Woodstock Festival

Filmmaker Conrad Rooks paid for Satchidananda to fly to New York in 1966, and artist Peter Max, who had been working with Rooks, introduced him to his many friends; Satchidananda stayed for five months. In August 1969, Satchidananda flew in to the Woodstock music festival by helicopter directly to the stage, arriving in orange robes, long hair, and flowing beard, and sitting down in lotus position to speak. He gave the opening address, giving a nod to Vivekananda's 1893 speech in Chicago by greeting the crowd with "Brothers and Sisters of America", telling the crowd that music was "the celestial sound that controls the whole universe", and leading chanting of "Hari Om ... Rama Rama". He was well received by the crowd.

In 1970, he opened a branch of his Integral Yoga Institute, on 770 Dolores Street, San Francisco. In 1973, Columbia Records produced a vinyl double LP Swami Satchidananda that featured a kirtan and a talk (not at Woodstock) by Satchidananda based on questions asked by students. The back cover illustration showed a photograph of the swami at Woodstock. The album was re-released in digital format as: Swami Satchidananda: The Woodstock Years. Satchidananda became a US citizen in 1976, having arrived on a visa stating that he was a "Minister of Divine Words".

American jazz pianist and harpist Alice Coltrane, the wife of John Coltrane, released Journey in Satchidananda in February 1971. The album's title and title track reflect the influence of Swami Satchidananda Saraswati, whom Coltrane had studied under and become close to. The composition "Shiva-Loka", or "realm of Shiva", refers to Shiva's role as the third member of the Hindu trinity, the "dissolver of creation". The presence of the tanpura reflects Coltrane's interest in Indian classical music and religion.

== Global travels ==
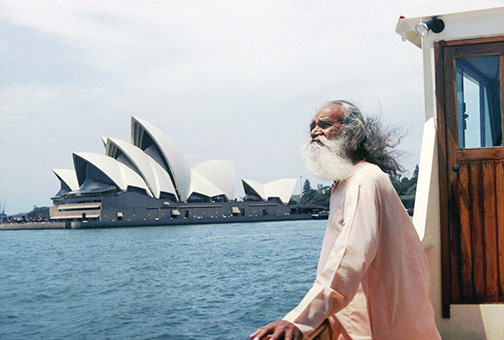
Swami Satchidananda, with Sydney Opera House in background, during a speaking tour of Australia, 1981

In over fifty years of public service, Satchidananda made eight world tours and logged two million miles of travel around the globe. "I don't belong to any one country or organization", he often said. In 1971, he made the first of several visits to Australia and New Zealand, as part of his second world tour. In late 1979, he opened the first Nambassa Festival in New Zealand, inspired by the Woodstock Festival. In 1975, he made his first South American trip, visiting Venezuela including giving a lecture at the Central University of Venezuela.

In Europe, Satchidananda was a guest speaker at programs sponsored by institutions such as the British Wheel of Yoga and the Italian and German Yoga Federations. From the late 1970s, for fifteen years, he spoke at the annual European Union of National Yoga Federations conference in Zinal, Switzerland. He traveled to Eastern Europe twice, as part of a citizen-diplomacy delegation. In 1985 and 1986, he went to Finland and the Soviet Union for 10-day tours by two peace organizations. He made yearly tours of India and Sri Lanka, and traveled in Asia and the Middle East to speak at yoga, peace, health, and other conferences.

== Integral Yoga ==
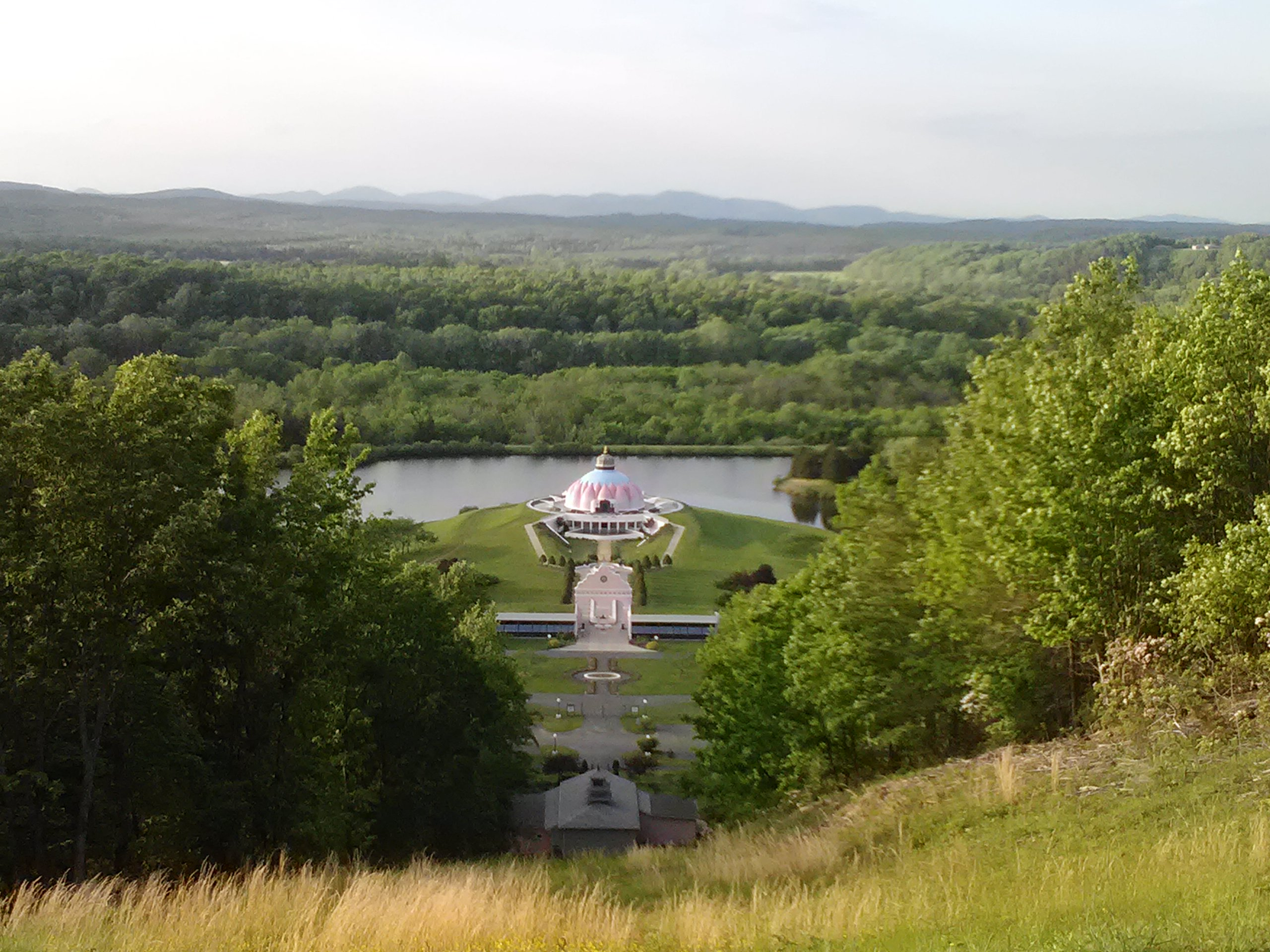
The grounds of Satchidananda's Integral Yoga headquarters, Yogaville, with its LOTUS shrine

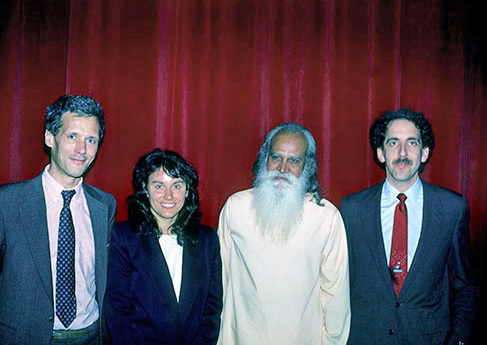
"The Mind-Body Connection: Stress, Attitude, Diet, and Your Health" with Satchidananda and Michael Lerner, Dean Ornish, and Sandra McLanahan, Charlottesville, Virginia, 1987

Satchidananda taught a blend of hatha yoga and yoga philosophy which he named Integral Yoga. In 1971, he began training students to teach yoga in prisons and drug rehabilitation centers. In 1976, Sandra McLanahan founded one of the first integrative health clinics in the US, offering yoga therapy, at that time new to America. Branches were opened in many places around the world.

The Integral Yoga headquarters at Satchidananda Ashram–Yogaville was founded in 1986. The LOTUS shrine cost $2 million, and Satchidananda blessed it on its opening by flying his helicopter to sprinkle holy water over it. The opening parade included a "flame-tossing juggler" and a baby elephant as well as religious figures.

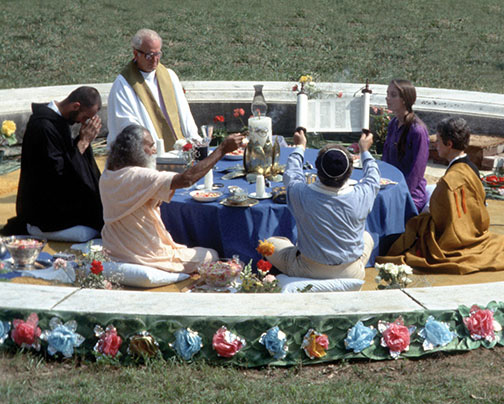
Interfaith service organized by Swami Satchidananda in 1975, Connecticut. Clockwise from the swami are Br. David, Fr. Beh, Taj Inayat, Roshi Prabhasa Dharma, Rabbi Gelberman.

Satchidananda was an early advocate of the interfaith movement in America. In the early 1950s, when the Divine Life Society was preparing for Guru Poornima Day, where each separate lineage honors its own Guru, Satchidananda suggested that the focus be on Sivananda and spiritual masters of other faiths. That tradition continues today in all Integral Yoga centers. In later decades, Satchidananda collaborated with other interfaith advocates, including the Very Rev. James P. Morton of the Interfaith Center of New York, Rabbi Joseph Gelberman, Brother David Steindl-Rast OSB, and Pir Vilayat Khan, holding monthly meetings. In 1968, Satchidananda co-founded the Center for Spiritual Studies in New York with Rabbi Gelberman, Br. David, and Eido Tai Shimano.

Over the years, he received many honors for his humanitarian service, including the Juliet Hollister Award presented at the United Nations in 1996. In 2002, he received the U Thant Peace Award. In 2014, he was posthumously honored as an "interfaith visionary", with the James Parks Morton Interfaith Award by the Interfaith Center of New York. He was named a "Fellow of World Thanksgiving" by the World Thanksgiving Council in 1981 and named "Hindu of the Year" by Hinduism Today magazine in 1994.

In 2009, Nalanie Chellaram founded a non-profit international collective of charities established in honor of Satchidananda and based on his core teaching of selfless service. Service in Satchidananda (SIS) exists to serve children and families in need around the globe through various seva (selfless service) projects. Currently, SIS operates charities in Spain, Gibraltar, Hong Kong, India and the United States.

== Vegetarianism ==
Satchidananda advocated a vegetarian diet for its health, ecological, and spiritual benefits. In 1972, he established the first vegetarian health food store in New York City, which remained the only vegetarian store in Manhattan, until its closure in late 2018. In 1986, Satchidananda authored The Healthy Vegetarian, a vegetarian cookbook with a foreword by Dean Ornish. Satchidananda inspired Ornish's dietary research.

== Sexual misconduct allegations ==
In 1991, about a decade before his death, protesters accused Satchidananda of molesting his students, and carried signs outside a hotel where he was staying in Virginia that read "Stop the Abuse". Several former disciples claimed he used his spiritual authority to coerce them into sexual relationships. After those first allegations, several more women made similar allegations of sexual manipulation and abuse. Satchidananda denied all the alleged abuses but refused to be interviewed about them.

In response to the controversy, 12 board members of various branches of the Integral Yoga Institute stepped down. Ex-members formed a support group, the Healing Through Truth Network, to support his alleged victims and to raise awareness of the misconduct claims. None of the alleged victims filed criminal charges.

Despite these events, followers remained loyal; Meryl Davids Landau wrote in the Elephant Journal in 2012 that the question for her was whether the teachings had served her, and she concluded that even though men like Swami Satchidananda and John Friend were "imperfect messenger[s]", one can appreciate what one gets from them.

== Death ==
On 19 August 2002, Swami Satchidananda died after speaking at a peace conference in Chennai, Tamil Nadu, India. His funeral took place in Yogaville on 22 August 2002.

== Books ==
- Satchidananda, Swami (2017) [1978]. Yoga Sutras of Patanjali. Buckingham, Virginia: Integral Yoga Publications. ISBN 978-1938477072.
- ——— (1977). Beyond Words. Buckingham, Virginia: Integral Yoga Publications. ISBN 978-0932040374.
- ——— (2014). Integral Yoga Hatha. Buckingham, Virginia: Integral Yoga Publications. OCLC 992976366.
- ——— (2017). The Yoga Way: Food for Body, Mind & Spirit. Buckingham, Virginia: Integral Yoga Publications. ISBN 978-0932040015.
- ——— (2019). The Woodstock Guru. Buckingham, Virginia: Integral Yoga Publications. ISBN 978-0932040039.

== Sources ==
- Bordow, Sita (2014) [1984]. Sri Swami Satchidananda: Apostle of Peace. Buckingham, Virginia: Integral Yoga Publications. ISBN 978-0932040312.
- Shearer, Alistair (2020). The Story of Yoga: From Ancient India to the Modern West. London: Hurst Publishers. ISBN 978-1-78738-192-6.
- Syman, Stefanie (2010). "How to be a Guru Without Really Trying". The Subtle Body: The Story of Yoga in America. New York: Farrar, Straus, and Giroux. pp. 233–255. ISBN 978-0-374-23676-2.
