= Conrad Rooks =

American film director (1934–2011)

- Born: December 15, 1934; Kansas City, Missouri, United States
- Died: December 27, 2011 (aged 77); Massachusetts, United States
- Occupations: Actor, film director, screenwriter, film producer
- Years active: 1966–2011
- Spouse(s): Zina Rachevsky (div); Pamela Rooks (div. 1985)
- Children: 1 (Ryan Rooks)

Conrad Rooks (December 15, 1934 in Kansas City, Missouri – December 27, 2011 in Massachusetts) was an American writer, director and producer most well known for his 1972 filmed adaptation of Hermann Hesse's novel Siddhartha.

== Early life ==
Rooks was an heir to the Avon Products cosmetics fortune, where his father, Russell Rooks, was one of the founding Presidents, who came up with the now famous phrase "Ding Dong Avon calling".

By the time he was eighteen, Rooks became a troubled substance abuser (alcohol, cocaine, heroin, et al.). After years of addiction, he traveled to Europe seeking a new "sleeping cure" being offered by a medical doctor at a clinic in Zurich. According to Rooks, the cure was successful and he never abused substances again.

Conrad spent much of his life traveling the globe, living abroad for many years in such places as New Delhi and Pattaya, Thailand.

== Career ==
In 1966 Rooks wrote, directed and starred in his first film, Chappaqua, a semi-autobiographical exploration of the perils of drug addiction, the agony of withdrawal, and the author's journey to Europe and success with the aforementioned "sleeping cure." The film won second prize at the Venice Film Festival in competition against works from established directors François Truffaut and Roger Vadim.

He directed the film Siddhartha which was released in 1972. It stars Shashi Kapoor.

He died on December 27, 2011, in Massachusetts.

== Family ==
He was married to the American heiress Zina Rachevsky and the couple had a son Alexander (1958-) and a daughter Rhea (1966-). Later he married the Indian director and screenwriter Pamela Rooks and the couple had a son, Ryan Rooks, before they divorced in 1985.
