= List of Egyptian films of 1955 =

A list of films produced in Egypt in 1955. For an A-Z list of films currently on Wikipedia, see Category:Egyptian films.

Title	Director	Cast	Genre	Notes
Abdulla the Great	Gregory Ratoff	Gregory Ratoff, Kay Kendall	comedy	
Hob wa Dumoo` (Love and Tears)	Kamal El Sheikh	Faten Hamama, Ahmed Ramzy, Zaki Rostom	Drama	
Ayyamna al-Holwa (Our Beautiful Days)	Helmy Halim	Faten Hamama, Omar Sharif, Abdel Halim Hafez, Ahmed Ramzy	Comedy / musical	
Hayat ou maut (Life or Death)	Kamal El Sheikh	Emad Hamdy, Madiha Yousri, Youssef Wahbi	Drama / thriller	Entered into the 1955 Cannes Film Festival

Lahn El-Wafaa (The Melody of Fulfillment) Abdel Halim Hafez, Shadia
