= The Sun Will Never Set =

1961 film by Salah Abu Seif

The Sun Will Never Set لا تطفئ الشمس
- The Sun Will Never Set VHS cover
- Directed by: Salah Abu Seif
- Written by: Ihsan Abdel Quddous; Helmy Halim
- Produced by: Omar Sharif
- Starring: Faten Hamama; Imad Hamdi; Shukry Sarhan; Nadia Lutfi; Ahmed Ramzy; Laila Taher
- Music by: Ali Ismail
- Release date: December 25, 1961
- Country: Egypt
- Language: Arabic

The Sun Will Never Set or Don't Set the Sun Off (Arabic: لا تطفئ الشمس, translit. La Tutf'e al-Shams) is a 1961 Egyptian romance film. Directed by the Egyptian film director Salah Abu Seif, this film is based on a novel with the same name written by the Egyptian novelist Ihsan Abdel Quddous in 1960 and co-written by Helmy Halim. The film was presented in the Karlovy Vary International Film Festival in 1962 and was selected as one of the best 150 Egyptian film productions in 1996. The film starred Faten Hamama, Imad Hamdi, Nadia Lutfi, Ahmed Ramzy, Shukry Sarhan and Laila Taher.

== Plot ==
An aristocratic family is torn down after the death of its patriarch. He leaves alone his widow wife and five of his daughters and sons. His eldest son, Ahmed (Shukry Sarhan), takes the role of the man in the house and helps his mother take care of his brother and sisters. Mamdouh (Ahmed Ramzy), his brother, is a self-centered man who refuses to follow his brother's step and decides to make his own decisions in his life. Meanwhile, despite restricting social conventions, Layla (Faten Hamama) falls in love with her piano teacher, a married man who is years older than she is, and marries him. The other two daughters accept their conditions and move on. Layla and Mamdouh's impetuous decisions result in unfortunate consequences. Layla divorces her husband shortly after their marriage and Mamdouh dies in a car accident after a quarrel. Ahmed finds the strength to face his brother's death and enrolls in the army to fight in the war. His sister falls in love with another soldier in the war, and Ahmed himself falls in love with a woman and marries her.

== Cast ==
- Faten Hamama as Layla
- Imad Hamdi as Fathi
- Shukry Sarhan as Ahmed
- Nadia Lutfi as Ahmed's girlfriend and wife
- Ahmed Ramzy as Mamdouh
- Laila Taher as Nabila
