= Fatet Ganbena =

1974 song by Abdel Halim Hafez

"فاتت جنبنا"
- Cassette cover for Fatet Ganbena, featuring Abdel Halim Hafez with composer Mohammed Abdel Wahab.

Song by Abdel Halim Hafez
- Language: Egyptian Arabic
- English title: She Passed By Us
- Released: 1974
- Label: Soutelphan
- Composer: Mohammed Abdel Wahab
- Lyricist: Hussein El Sayed

Fatet Ganbena (Arabic: فاتت جنبنا; "She Passed By Us") is a 1974 Egyptian Arabic song performed by Abdel Halim Hafez, with lyrics by Hussein El Sayed and music composed by Mohammed Abdel Wahab. A long-form romantic composition, the song was developed by Abdel Wahab and El Sayed as a musical narrative divided into three acts.

Fatet Ganbena was first performed by Hafez on 30 June 1974 at the Grand Celebrations Hall of Cairo University, following delays to its planned spring debut, partly caused by Hafez's illness. During the concert, Hafez introduced Fatet Ganbena in the first half and another new song, Ay Dam'et Hozn La, written by Mohamed Hamza and composed by Baligh Hamdi, in the second half. The concert was broadcast live on Egyptian television and radio. Hafez subsequently performed the song at concerts elsewhere in the Arab world, including Lebanon, and during his 1974 appearance at the Palais des congrès de Paris in Paris. A recording of the Paris performance was also commercially released in France by La Voix du Globe around 1975.

Fatet Ganbena was the first romantic song composed by Mohammed Abdel Wahab for Abdel Halim Hafez since Ya Khaley El Alb (1969), featured in the film Abi Foq El Shagara. It was also his first collaboration with lyricist Hussein El Sayed since Haga Ghariba and Gabar, both featured in the 1967 film Maaboudat El Gamaheer, and their final collaboration before Hafez's death in 1977.

== Background and composition ==
Mohammed Abdel Wahab traced the origins of Fatet Ganbena to his request that lyricist Hussein El Sayed write a song similar to Saken Osady (ساكن قصادي), which he had previously composed for Nagat El-Sagheera. The two developed a narrative in three acts, progressing from an initial encounter to a romantic attachment and the protagonist's eventual expression of his feelings through a letter.

Hafez's manager, Magdi El Amrousi, recalled that Abdel Halim Hafez was impressed by El Sayed's lyrics but that Abdel Wahab was initially reluctant to compose the music. Hafez reportedly encouraged Abdel Wahab to proceed, offering to take responsibility for any losses if the song proved unsuccessful. Abdel Wahab eventually composed the music, although El Amrousi said he remained uncertain of the song's potential.

Preparations for the song were complicated by Hafez's health. Abdel Wahab recalled that Hafez suffered a blood clot in his calf during rehearsals but insisted on continuing to work. Rehearsals were subsequently held at Hafez's home, where a chair was arranged to support his injured leg. Abdel Wahab described the composition as a narrative work whose musical development had required considerable thought.

== Music and arrangement ==
Fatet Ganbena features an orchestral arrangement combining Eastern and Western musical instruments. Its introduction begins with strings and organ, followed by passages featuring guitar and ney, and incorporates elements of rumba and waltz rhythms.

The composition has been analyzed as being based principally on maqam Ajam, with transitions into other maqamat, including Nahawand in the second verse and passages employing Kurd and Saba. The arrangement also features the electric accordion, particularly during the second verse.

Pauses are also used as a dramatic device, notably during the narrator's repeated questioning of whether the woman is interested in him or his friend, and after the word "حبيتها" ("I loved her") in the second verse. These interruptions have been interpreted as reinforcing the protagonist's hesitation and uncertainty, allowing the musical structure to reflect the developing narrative.

== Lyrics ==
The lyrics of Fatet Ganbena follow a romantic narrative told from the perspective of a young man, portrayed by Hafez, who becomes interested in a woman encountered while walking with a friend. When the woman smiles at the two men, the narrator becomes preoccupied with whether her attention was directed towards him or his companion. A subsequent chance encounter intensifies his feelings, leading him to question whether his friend is experiencing the same attraction. As the narrative progresses, the narrator's emotions alternate between romantic excitement, happiness, doubt and jealousy. Eventually, he expresses his feelings to the woman in a letter and receives a favorable response, confirming that her interest had been directed towards him from the beginning.

=== Development and revisions ===
Hameda Hussein El Sayed, the lyricist's daughter, recalled that the original story ended with the woman choosing the narrator's friend rather than the narrator himself. She said that Mohammed Abdel Wahab persuaded her father to change the conclusion so that the woman would instead choose the character portrayed by Hafez. El Sayed revised the ending accordingly.

A 2025 account identified two lines reportedly omitted from Hussein El Sayed's original lyrics at the request of Hafez and Abdel Wahab, who considered them unnecessary to the narrative. The lines were said to have appeared during the narrator's celebration of falling in love, expressing a wish to share his happiness with the world and for other lovers to experience similar joy. They were reportedly replaced by a passage in which his uncertainty returns, marking a transition from romantic exhilaration to anxiety and jealousy over whether he would encounter the woman again.

== Live performances ==
Fatet Ganbena premiered on 30 June 1974 at the Grand Celebrations Hall of Cairo University, during a concert held as part of the university's cultural programme. Hafez performed the song in the first half of the concert, followed by Ay Dam'et Hozn La, written by Mohamed Hamza and composed by Baligh Hamdi, in the second half. The concert was broadcast live on Egyptian television and radio.

Later accounts describe an enthusiastic audience response to the premiere, with songwriter Mustafa El-Demrani recalling the concert as a major success.

Following its premiere, Hafez performed Fatet Ganbena at other concerts in the Arab world, including in Lebanon. He also performed the song during his 1974 concerts at the Palais des congrès de Paris in Paris. A later musicological assessment noted difficulties filling the Palais des Congrès for Hafez's 1974 concerts and suggested that his health affected the quality of his performances compared with earlier concerts in Tunis.

== Recordings and release history ==
A live recording of Fatet Ganbena from Hafez's 30 June 1974 premiere at Cairo University was released by Soutelphan on vinyl later that year. Due to the song's length, the recording was divided between the two sides of the record. Subsequent CD editions, beginning in 1991, preserved the complete performance, which lasts approximately 49 minutes. These recordings also include Hafez's spoken introduction, in which he acknowledges composer Mohammed Abdel Wahab and lyricist Hussein El Sayed before beginning the song.

A separate recording of Hafez's 1974 performance at the Palais des congrès de Paris was commercially released in France by La Voix du Globe, under catalogue number VDG100.012. The release has been dated to approximately 1975 in a published discography.

A 1996 edition of Fatet Ganbena was issued by EMI Music Arabia under catalogue number 0946 310571-2.

== Reception and critical analysis ==
Mohammed Abdel Wahab recalled that an unnamed prominent journalist initially criticized Fatet Ganbena but changed his opinion and praised the composition approximately one year after its premiere.

A retrospective analysis linked the song's shifts in maqam and rhythm to the narrator's changing emotions, including excitement, romantic uncertainty and jealousy. Its return to maqam Ajam at the conclusion has been interpreted as marking the resolution of the story's central uncertainty. The same analysis praised the composition's melodic construction and characterized it as emphasizing musical expression over tarab, while cautioning that the emotional associations of individual maqamat are not fixed.

A separate retrospective review examined Fatet Ganbena as an example of the long-form Arabic song, or ughniya, highlighting its combination of Western musical structures and orchestration with traditional Arabic maqamat. Particular attention has been given to the contrasts between intimate passages and more elaborate, rhythmically dense sections. The review also characterized the composition as a culmination of the long-form style developed during Hafez's career.
