= Dalila (film) =

Dalila دليلة
- Directed by: Mohammed Karim
- Written by: Ali El Zorkani; Helmy Halim
- Produced by: Waheed Farid; Ramses Naguib; Abdel Halim Hafez
- Starring: Shadia; Abdel Halim Hafez; Rushdy Abaza; Ferdoos Mohammed; Zuzu Madi
- Release date: January 3, 1956
- Country: Egypt
- Language: Egyptian Arabic

Dalila (Egyptian Arabic: دليلة, translit. Maw`ed Gharam) is a 1956 Egyptian romance/musical film directed and co-written by the Egyptian film director Mohammed Karim. It stars Shadia, Abdel Halim Hafez, Zubaida Tharwat and Rushdy Abaza.

== Plot ==
He is a good and dominant person, but has a beautiful voice. He lives in a rented apartment and next to a beautiful girl. He is surprised that you love him and she loves him, but luck does not end, as she falls seriously ill. He is trying as much as possible to collect some money, so he tried with the talent of voice and singing, so it would be easy, and he would collect and do the operation for the girl.

== Main cast ==
- Shadia as Dalila
- Abdel Halim Hafez as Mahmoud Fathy
- Zouzou Madi as Fekreya Hanem
- Abdel Warith Asr as Professor Hosni
- Ferdoos Mohammed as Baheya's aunt
- Zubaida Tharwat as Enayat's friends
- Rushdy Abaza as Mohsen
- Mary Ezz El-Din as Sonia the singer
- Ahmed El-Haddad as El-Akhras
- Adly Kasseb as Radio director
- Abdel Moneim Ismail as Abdo
- Fawzy Darwish as Record company owner
- Ezzat El-Gahly as Professor Barei, band manager
- Alia Fawzy as Ebtihaj, band owner
- Salwa Ezz El-Din as Enayat Hanem's maid
- Fawzia Ibrahim as Mohsen's friend
- Fifi Salama as One of the dancers
- Ellen Diato as One of the dancers
- Tahani Rashid as One of Enayat's friends
- George Yordanidis as Christo
