= Struggle in the Pier =

Egyptian film

Sira` Fi al-Mina صراع في الميناء
- Sira` Fi al-Mina poster
- Directed by: Youssef Chahine
- Written by: Youssef Chahine; El Sayed Bedeir
- Produced by: Gabriel Telhamy
- Starring: Faten Hamama; Omar Sharif; Ahmed Ramzy
- Release date: 1956
- Country: Egypt
- Language: Arabic

Sira` Fi al-Mina (Arabic: صراع في الميناء, English: Struggle in the Pier, but also titled Dark Waters in later releases, French: Les Eaux Noires) is a 1956 Egyptian romance/crime/drama film directed by the acclaimed Egyptian film director Youssef Chahine. It starred Omar Sharif, Ahmed Ramzy, and Faten Hamama.

== Plot ==
The film takes place in a port in Alexandria and focuses on the lives of some sailors. Hamidah (Faten Hamama) works in a ship and plans to marry her cousin, Ragab (Omar Sharif), but Ragab is forced to leave for a long period. While he was away, Hamidah falls in love with Mamdouh, a wealthy man. Ragab returns three years later to find her in a relationship with someone else. He fights for her and wins her back again and marries her.

== Main cast ==
- Faten Hamama as Hamidah
- Omar Sharif as Ragab
- Ferdoos Mohammed as Ragab's mother
- Ahmed Ramzy as Mamdouh
- Hussein Riad as Mamdouh's father
- Tawfik Aldikn as GM
