= The Slave (1962 film) =

1962 film directed by Sergio Corbucci

- Directed by: Sergio Corbucci
- Screenplay by: Adriano Bolzoni; Giovanni Grimaldi; Bruno Corbucci
- Produced by: Franco Palaggi
- Starring: Steve Reeves; Jacques Sernas; Gianna Maria Canale
- Cinematography: Enzo Barboni
- Edited by: Ruggero Mastroianni
- Music by: Piero Piccioni
- Production company: Titanus
- Distributed by: Metro-Goldwyn-Mayer
- Release date: 24 August 1962 (Italy)
- Running time: 100 minutes
- Country: Italy

The Slave (Italian: Il figlio di Spartacus, lit. 'The Son of Spartacus') is a 1962 Italian peplum film directed by Sergio Corbucci and starring Steve Reeves and Gianna Maria Canale. It is an unofficial sequel to Stanley Kubrick's 1960 film Spartacus, as it includes a mention of the character Varinia, who was specifically created for the novel template for that film.

== Plot ==
In 48 B.C., twenty-five years after the revolt of Spartacus, the slave leader's son Randus (who is ignorant of his heritage) has grown to become a soldier in the Roman army. Stationed in the city of Alexandria, Egypt, Randus has been promoted to centurion by his commander, Gaius Julius Caesar, and is given an important task to accomplish: To travel to the city of Zeugma in the eastern provinces of the Roman Empire and learn of the secret plots planned out by the local Roman governor, Marcus Licinius Crassus. Randus leaves Egypt on a war galley out to sea, accompanied by his decurion friend Lumonius, his Germanic servant Beroz, an ambitious Gallic officer named Vetius, and Vetius' sister Claudia.

Shortly after departing from Alexandria, Randus meets and befriends a young Egyptian slavegirl named Saida, who is owned by Claudia. On a thick foggy night, the galley collides with a hidden reef and Saida is thrown overboard. Randus dives in to save Saida, but both are unable to get back to the ship as it sails away. The two are soon washed up onto a beach and decide to travel across the desert until they find a caravan that can provide them with water and supplies. They soon encounter a slave caravan guarded by a detachment of Berber mercenaries who work for Crassus, but are captured and added to the slaves' ranks. During the journey across the desert to Zeugma, one of the slaves, an ex-gladiator and survivor of Spartacus' army named Gulbar, recognizes Randus as the son of Spartacus and Varinia after discovering Spartacus' amulet around the young centurion's neck. Together, Randus and the slaves manage to free themselves from their captors and kill all of the Berber soldiers. Before Randus' friends, Vetius and Lumonius arrive with some of Crassus' guards to rescue Randus, Gulbar tells Randus to find him and his slave army at the legendary "City of the Sun" before the slaves vanish into the desert.

Randus proceeds to Zeugma, where he meets Crassus, who cold-bloodedly orders the execution of the slaves who participated in the uprising despite Randus' protestations, and Lumonius informs him of Crassus secretly amassing a huge army. Accompanied by Beroz, Randus later rides to the City of the Sun, in whose ruins he finds the grave of Spartacus. As he turns away, Gulbar and the freed slaves appear and convince him to take up his father's legacy. Later that night, Randus, armed with his father's sword and helmet, frees several slaves condemned to death and then begins a rebel campaign, resparking hope in the people of the province, who are being brutally oppressed by Crassus. Randus is tasked to capture the Son of Spartacus, but naturally fails to succeed; to throw off suspicion, Beroz occasionally plays his master's role until Randus can change into his secret identity unnoticed.

In order to draw the Son of Spartacus into a trap, Crassus organizes a party in his palace, whose central attraction is the slow death of several slaves in a sealed cage filled with poisonous fumes. Randus dons his mask and intervenes; in the resulting chaos, Murdok, the brother of Crassus' most important ally King Pharnaces and the party's featured guest, is killed. When Crassus flees, Randus pursues him into the castle dungeons, where he is trapped and unmasked. Enraged, Crassus decides to deliver Randus to Pharnaces in order to maintain his support in defeating Julius Caesar and subsequently assuming rulership over Rome. Lumonius, who remains loyal to Randus, flees and informs the rebels of Crassus' plan before he proceeds to warn Caesar.

Later, as Crassus' entourage camps in the desert, the rebel slaves, led by Beroz, attack them, free Randus and capture Crassus and Claudia, while Vetius is killed by Randus. Spared by Saida's pleas for mercy, Claudia is abandoned in the desert with Beroz's dagger for a merciful suicide, while Crassus is killed by the slaves pouring molten gold into his mouth. Later, Caesar arrives and, after learning of Randus' heritage, reluctantly sentences him to death by crucifixion because Randus has become a powerful symbol for resistance against Roman order. But as the sentence is about to be carried out, all the people in the province appear, willing to join their hero in death. Impressed by this show of loyalty, and realizing that killing them all would leave the province worthless, Caesar pardons Randus. Randus returns his father's sword to Spartacus' grave so that a future hero may use it to rise against oppression.

== Cast ==
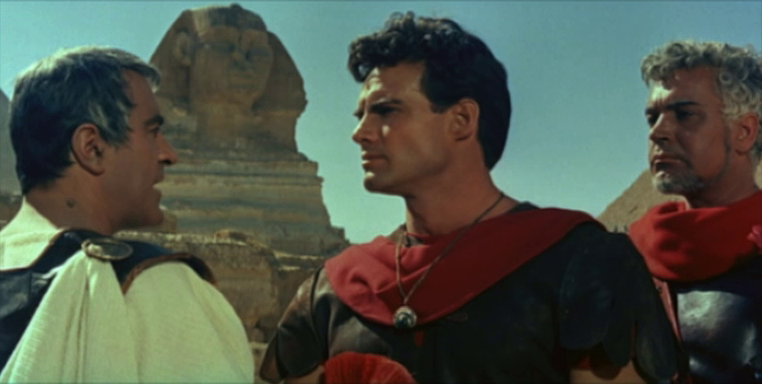
From left to right, Ivo Garrani, Steve Reeves, and Renato Baldini.

- Steve Reeves as Randus
- Gianna Maria Canale as Claudia
- Claudio Gora as Crassus
- Ahmed Ramzy as Murdok
- Jacques Sernas as Vetius
- Ombretta Colli as Saida
- Ivo Garrani as Julius Caesar
- Enzo Fiermonte as Gulbar
- Franco Balducci as Beroz
- Roland Bartrop as Lumonius
- Renato Baldini as Verulus
- Giovanni Cianfriglia as Soldier

== Production ==
The film was shot between Rome and Cairo. The film was the last sword-and-sandal film for actor Steve Reeves.

== Reception ==
In his book Cinema Italiano - The Complete Guide From Classics To Cult, Howard Hughes describes the film as one of Steve Reeves' finest vehicles and as Corbucci's best peplum film.
