= Tasseography =

Divination method

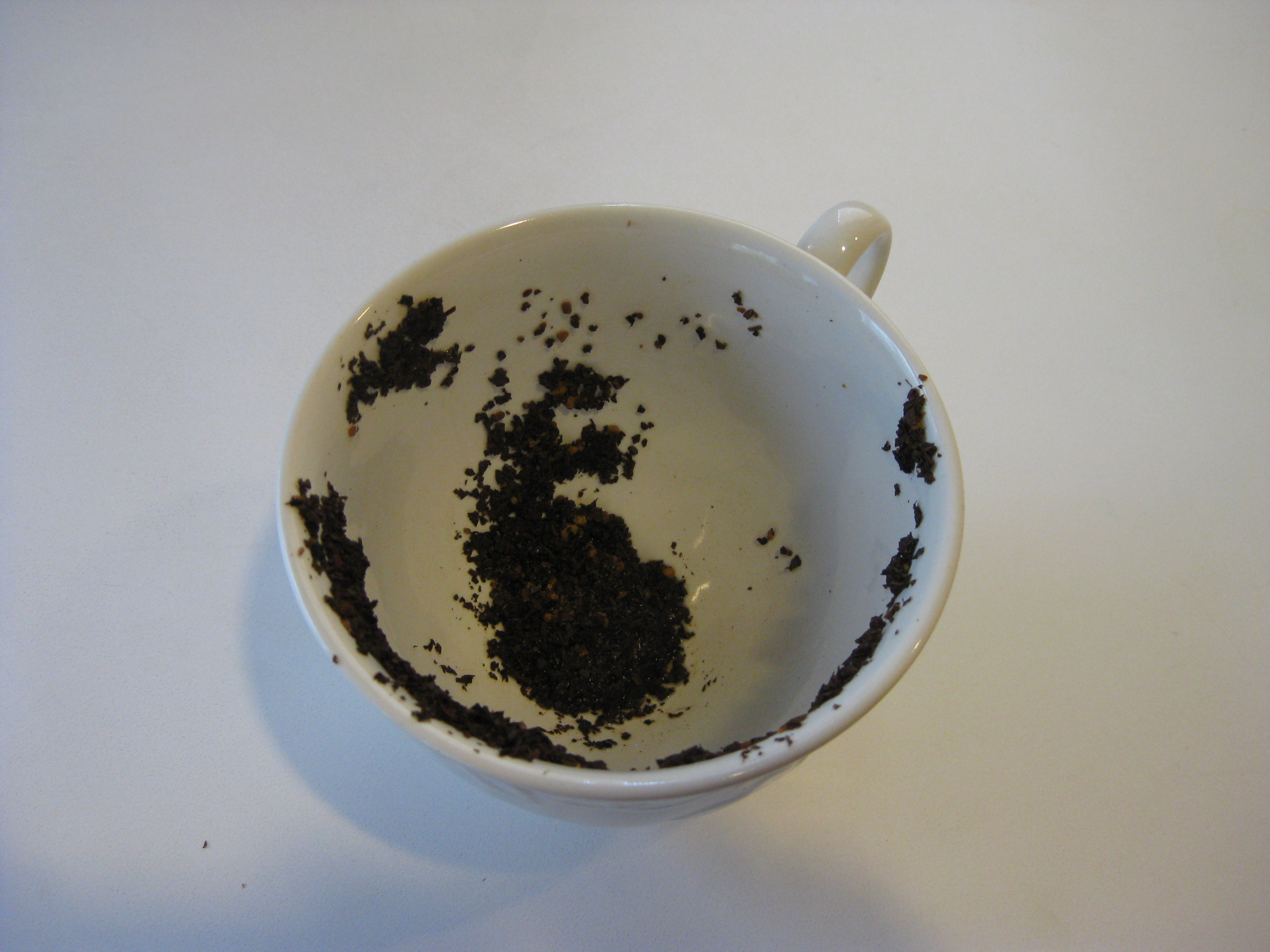
An example of a tea leaf reading, showing what may be interpreted as a dog and a bird on the side of the cup

Tasseography (also known as tasseomancy, tassology, or tasseology) is a divination or fortune-telling method that interprets patterns in tea leaves, coffee grounds, or wine sediments.

The terms derive from the French word tasse (cup), which in turn derives from the Arabic loan-word into French tassa, and the respective Greek suffixes -graph (writing), -mancy (divination), and -logy (study of).

== History ==
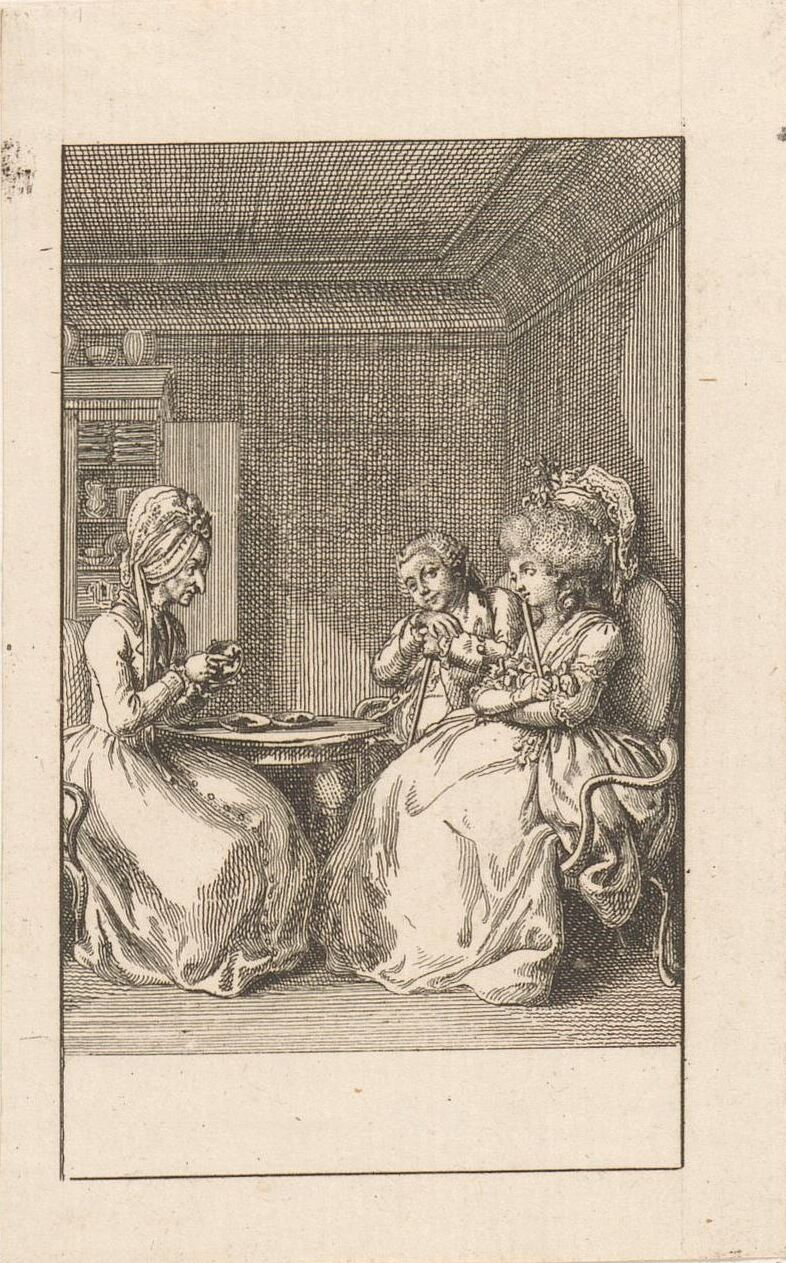
Dwaasheid van het bijgeloof (Foolishness of superstition), a 1782 engraving by Daniel Chodowiecki

Tasseomancy followed the trade routes of tea and coffee and was practiced by both Baltic and Slavic nations. It is closely related to the Romani people, whose nomadic lifestyle contributed to the spread of the practice. While tea leaf reading originated in China, likely soon after the creation of tea, various regions practice it with slight variations, indicating that this form of divination was an oral tradition. It is not considered a closed cultural practice, but oftentimes it is traditional to ask permission from a Romani elder as a sign of respect.

Western tasseography can be linked to medieval European fortune tellers who developed their readings from splatters of wax, lead, and other molten substances, which are related to many similar and established rituals in Asia such as pagtatawas.

According to different sources, coffee fortune-telling first appeared in the Ottoman Palaces in the 1500s. Arabic coffee is a coffee culture that later spread from Yemen to the rest of the Middle East, Ottoman Empire and the Balkans, and then to many parts of the world. Coffee started somewhere in the Arab world and West Asia. When they were bored, the concubines in the Ottoman harem used to drink coffee and tell each other fortunes to chat and gossip.

== Method of tea-leaf reading ==
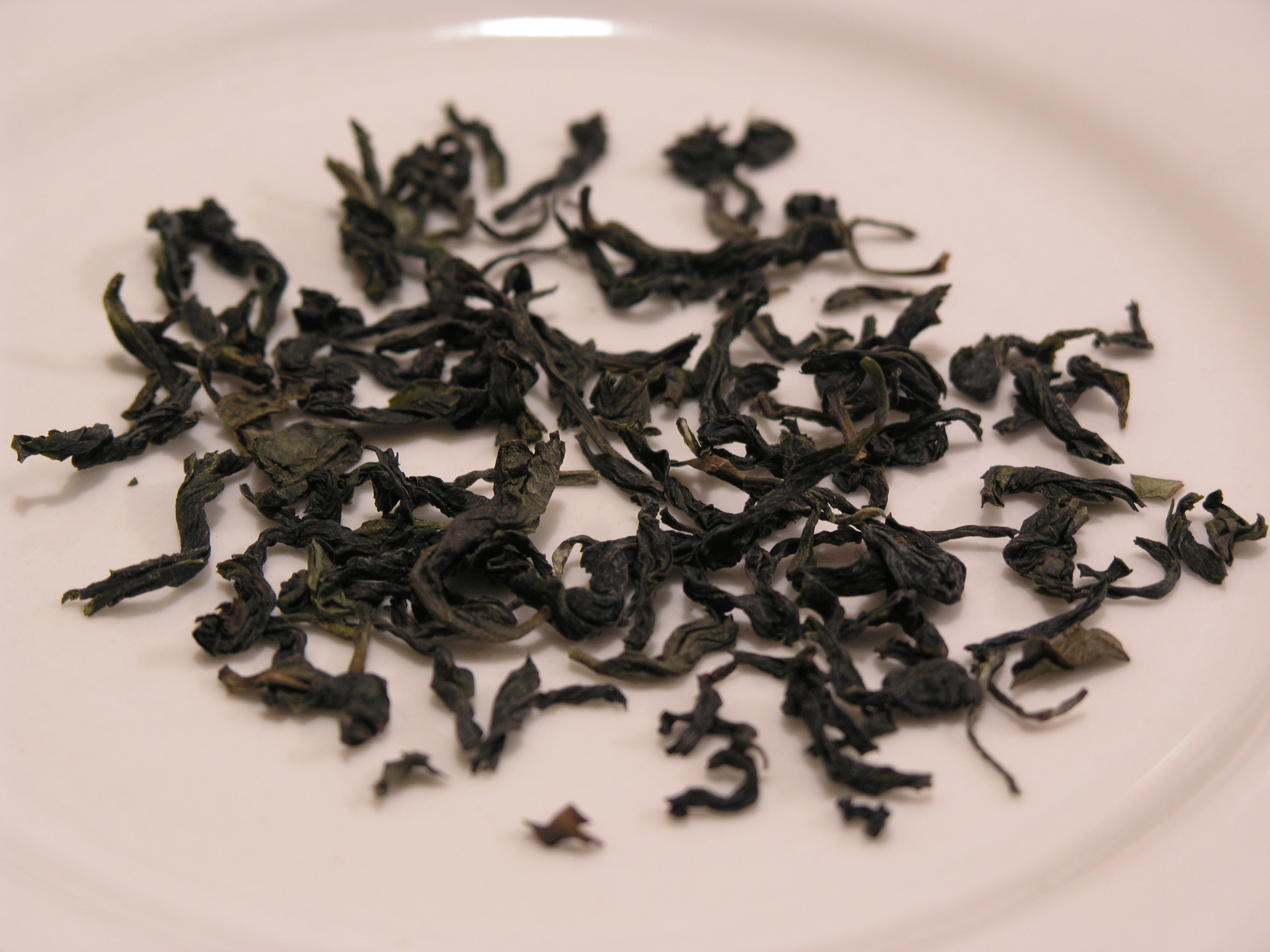
Spring Pouchong tea (Chinese: 包種茶; pinyin: Bāozhòngchá) leaves that may be used for tasseography divination

The Encyclopedia of Occultism & Parapsychology, Fifth Edition, Vol. 2, edited by J. Gordon Melton, notes:

After a cup of tea has been poured, without using a tea strainer, the tea is drunk or poured away. The cup should then be shaken well and any remaining liquid drained off in the saucer. The diviner now looks at the pattern of tea leaves in the cup and allows the imagination to play around [with] the shapes suggested by them. They might look like a letter, a heart shape, or a ring. These shapes are then interpreted intuitively or by means of a fairly standard system of symbolism, such as: snake (enmity or falsehood), spade (good fortune through industry), mountain (journey of hindrance), or house (change, success).

Melton's described methods of pouring away the tea and shaking the cup are rarely seen; most readers ask the querent to drink the tea off, then swirl the cup.

Regarding interpretation of leaves, according to James Randi, "Leaves on the bottom, we're told, indicate the distant future, those on the rim the immediate future. Tea leaf stems represent persons. Fat stems are fat people, for example."

== Fortune telling tea cups ==
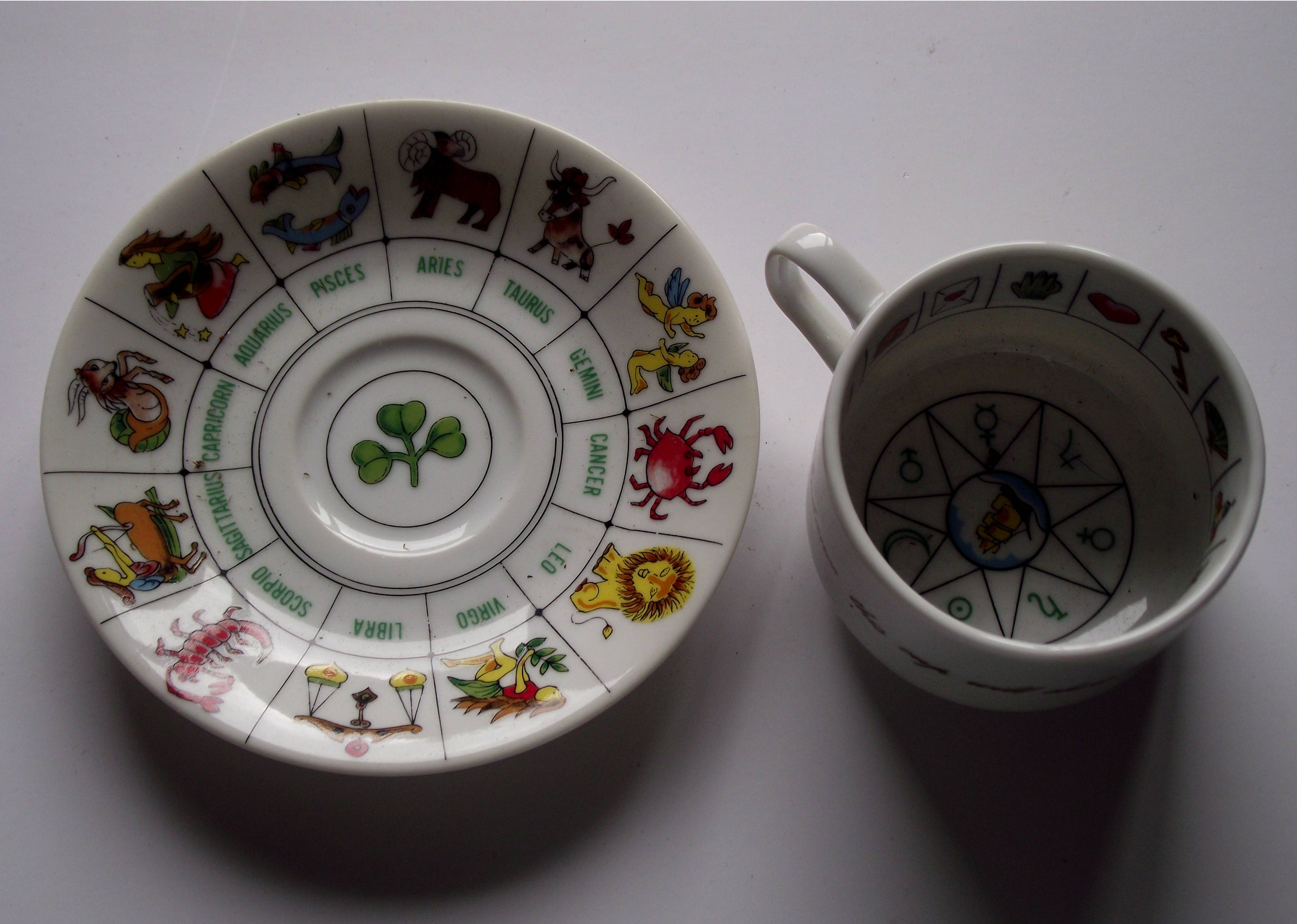
Zodiac cup and saucer with zodiac signs and shamrock

Although many people prefer a simple white cup for tea leaf reading, there are also traditions concerning the positional placement of the leaves in the cup, and some find it easier to work with marked cups. Beginning in the late 19th century and continuing to the present, English and American potteries have produced specially decorated cup and saucer sets for the use of tea-leaf readers. Many of these designs are patented and come with instructions explaining their mode of use. Some of the most common were those that were given away with purchases of bulk tea.

== Coffee reading ==
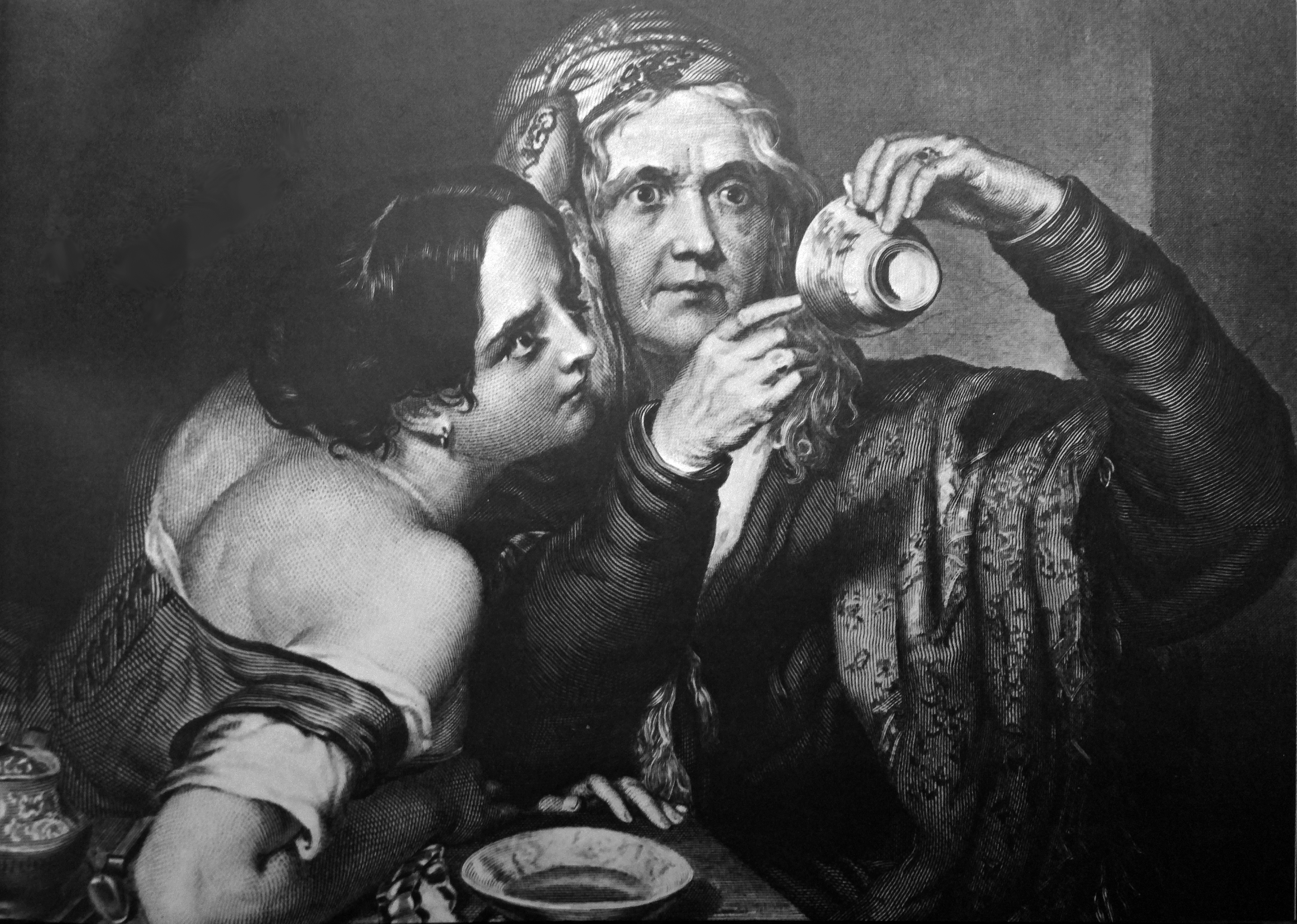
Cleas an ćopáin - Cup tossing, 1842 engraving by Nicholas Joseph Crowley

Coffee reading (Arabic: قراءة الفنجان, romanized: qirāʾat al-finjān; Persian: فال قهوه; Turkish: kahve falı; Greek: καφεμαντεία; Serbian: гледање у шољу) is traditionally practiced using Arabic or Turkish coffee, as they produce a very thick sediment. The coffee in the cup is consumed, and the sediment is left to settle.

There are several variations of coffee reading. They commonly require for the cup to be covered with the saucer and turned upside-down. In the Turkish tradition, coffee-readers often interpret the cup as being divided into horizontal halves: symbols appearing on the bottom half are interpreted as messages regarding the past, and symbols on the top half are messages regarding the future. The cup may also be interpreted in vertical halves to determine "yes" or "no" answers as well as the overall outcome of the events represented by symbols. For example, some fortune tellers may "read" symbols in the "left" half as "negative" events or outcomes, while symbols in the "right" half are "read" as "positive". Other readers may adhere to the belief that the cup is capable of revealing insights about the past, but it cannot predict events beyond forty days into the future. The saucer may also be incorporated into the reading. As with the cup, different variations exist for what the saucer represents, including whether the saucer sticking to the cup indicates a "positive" or "negative" outcome.

== Symbols ==
When a cup of tea or coffee has been drunk, a sediment often remains.

This sediment can be known to form patterns or symbols within it, leaving a perfect canvas for interpretation. There are many possibilities of images appearing in a cup. Images formed in a cup are created and uniquely seen by the reader, so it is often said that the only limitation for cup reading is the imagination of the reader themselves.

Symbols can be many things, including physical objects and abstract concepts. Often, the reader will interpret symbols collectively for a prediction as well as acknowledging their individual meanings.

There are also many classic image interpretations that were developed in Great Britain in the late 1800s as tasseomancy gained popularity as a parlour game.

== In popular culture ==
- Qari'at al-Finjan (قارئة الفنجان), a classic Arabic song
- In the Harry Potter books written by J. K. Rowling, the divination teacher Sybill Trelawney practices tasseography with tea leaves
- In Coraline, the characters of Miss Spink and Miss Forcible read the protagonist's future in tea leaves
- In the episode "Grandchild" on The Waltons, a baby shower for Mary Ellen includes Flossie Brimmer reading tea leaves.

== See also ==
- Methods of divination
- Pareidolia – Perception of meaningful patterns or images in random or vague stimuli
- Rorschach test – Projective psychological test created in 1921
