= Ahmed Ramzy =

Egyptian actor

Ahmad Ramzy
- أحمد رمزي
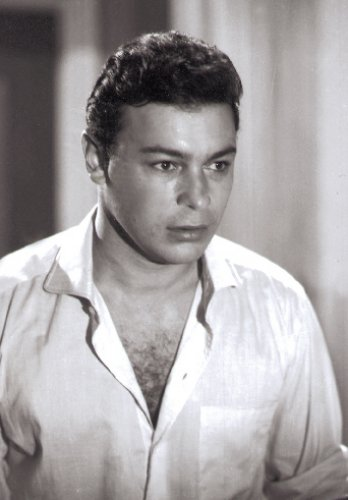
- Ahmed Ramzy in the late 1950s
- Born: Ramzy Mahmoud Bayyumi; 23 March 1930; Alexandria, Kingdom of Egypt
- Died: 28 September 2012 (aged 82); Matrouh, Egypt
- Resting place: Matrouh, Egypt
- Years active: 1955–2010

Ahmad Ramzy (Arabic: أحمد رمزي; born Ramzy Mahmoud Bayyumi [رمزي محمود بيومي]; 23 March 1930 – 28 September 2012) was an Egyptian actor who played leading roles in many Egyptian films in 1950s, 1960s, and 1970s.

== Early life ==
Ramzy was born Ramzy Mahoud Bayoumi in 1930. He graduated from Alexandria's Victoria College where he met someone by the name of Michel Dimitri who later on was known as Omar Sharif, they became friends since then. After finishing his school, Ramzy joined the Medical school for 3 years, before transferring to the Faculty of Commerce, which he eventually dropped to pursue his career in acting. Ramzy has one brother, Dr. Hassan Bayoumi, who followed in their father's footsteps and has his practice in London.

== Career ==
Ahmad Ramzy was discovered by Helmy Halim in 15–2–1955, while playing snooker in a club. He was cast by Halim in his first role, as "Ramzy" in Ayyamna al-Holwa (Our Best Days), along with Faten Hamama, Abdel Halim Hafez, and his lifelong friend and schoolmate Omar Sharif, The film was a box office hit. In this film he also starred the first time with very close lifetime friend Abdel Halim Hafez. Next year 1956 saw Ramzy's first starring role in Hob wa Dumoo` (Love and Tears) with Faten Hamama.

In the late 1950s, Ramzy appeared in numerous films and became known for portraying funny playboys and romantic womanizers. Although younger actors began taking on similar roles in the following decade, this did not diminish his demand for such roles.

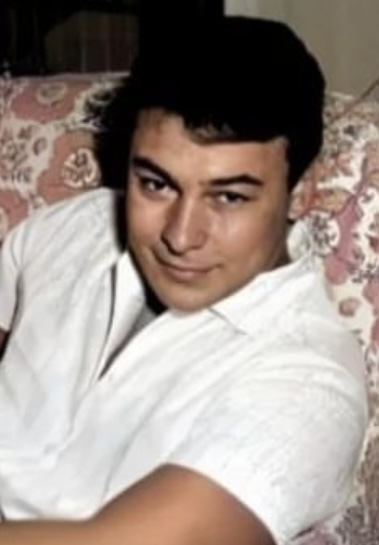
Ramzy in 1962

By the early 1960s, making films with more than one leading star was in favor, Ramzy teamed up with other stars or younger actors like Hassan Youseff, Youssef Fakhr Eddine, Mohamed Awad and others in a film and the fashion of trio stars films begun with titles like The 3 wild ones, The 3 adventures and more which lasted to early 1970s.

During the 1970s, Ramzy starred in Chitchat on the Nile (1971), which is widely regarded as one of his best performances. He also began participating in foreign movies shot outside Egypt, He participated in movies produced in Italy (such as Il Figlio di Spartacus (The Son of Spartacus)), Lebanon (such as Fondok El Saada (Hotel of Joy)) and Syria (such as Banat lil Hob (Girls for Love)).

Ramzy's active years began to be fade due to age and cinema changing moods, his 1974 film Al Abtal (The Heroes) that co-starred Farid Shawki was notable for the fact it was Egypt's first martial arts film and used the soundtrack of Bruce Lee's Enter the Dragon. By mid 1970s Ramzy was saying goodbye to the cinema as from 1979 to 1981 saw only two films, then he focused on his trading business, though he was convinced to make a comeback in 1999 in the film " Ket El Saharaa (Desert Cat) followed by a TV series Wajh al-Qamar (Face of the Moon) with Faten Hamama in 2001.

By the entrance of the new millennium, Ramzy participated in another film by the name of El Warda El Hamra (The Red Rose) with actress Yousra and his last appearance was in a TV series called Hanan W Haneen with his eternal friend Omar Sharif, Omar's grandson - Omar Sharif, Jr. and Kareem Hamdy in 2007.

== Selected filmography ==
- Hanan W Hanin (2010, Television) with Omar Sharif
- El Warda El Hamra (The Red Rose) (2002) with Yousra
- Wageh El Amar (Face of the Moon) (2001, television) with Faten Hamama
- Hekaya wara kol bab (A Story Behind Every Door) (1979)
- Loghat El Hob (The Language of Love) (1974) with (Nahed Sherif)
- Al Amaleka (1974) with Nahed Sherif and Samir Sabry
- El Abtal (The Heroes) (1974) with Farid Shawki and Mona Gabr
- Banat lil Hob (Girls for Love) (1973)
- El Bahth An Fedihah (1973) with Adel Emam, Samir Sabry, and Mervat Amin
- Adwaa El Madina (City Lights) (1972) with Shadia and Ahmad Mazhar
- Fondok El Saada (Hotel of Joy) (1971)
- Thartharah fawqa al-Nīl (Adrift on the Nile) (1971)
- El Saat El Akhira (The Last Hours) (1970) with Nabila Ebeid, Yousif Shaaban and Nawal Abou El Fetouh
- Al Saat Al Raheeba (The Terrible Hours) (1970) with Nabila Ebeid, Yousif Shaaban and Nawal Abou El Fetouh
- Harebat Men El Hob (Escaping from Love) (1970) with Mervat Amin and Nabila Ebeid
- Heya Wa Al Shayateen (She and the Devils) (1969) with Shams El Barudy
- Thalath Nessaa (Three Women) (1968) with Salah Zulfikar, Mervat Amin, Sabah and Huda Sultan.
- Hawaa Wa El Kerd (Eve and the Monkey) (1968) with Soad Hosny and Mohamed Awad
- Shabab magnoun geddan (Very Crazy Youth) (1967) with Soad Hosny
- Al Asdekaa Al Thalatha (The 3 Friends) (1966) with Mohamed Awad, El Dief Ahmad, and Yousiff Shaaban
- Shakawet Ragala (Awful Men) (1966) with Rushdy Abaza and Soad Hosny
- Al Moghameroon Al Thalatha (The Three Adventurers) (1966) with Soad Hosny, Hassan Yousiff, and Mohamed Awad
- Laylat El Zefaf (The Wedding Night) (1966) with Soad Hosny and Ahmad Mazhar
- Shaket El Talaba (The Students' Apartment) (1966) with Soad Hosny, Rushdy Abaza, and Hassan Yousiff
- Hikayat al-'Omr Kolloh(Story of a Lifetime) (1965) with Farid al-Atrash and Faten Hamama
- AL Ibn Al Mafkood (The Lost Son) (1965) with Amal Farid and Nagwa Foad
- Eeterafat Zog (Confessions of a Husband) (1965) with Fouad el-Mohandes, Youssef Wahbi, Shwikar and Hind Rostom
- Sobyan We Banat (Boys and Girls) (1965) with Nahed Sherief
- El Ainab el murr (Sour Grapes) (1965)with Lobna Abdel Aziz
- Akher Shakawa (Frivolous Youth) (1964) with Hassan Youssif, Mohamed Awad, and Zizi El Badrawy
- Awal Hob (First Love) (1964) with Soad Hosny
- El Naddara el sawdaa (The Dark Glasses) (1963) with Nadia Lutfi and Ahmad Mazhar
- La Tutf'e al-Shams (The Sun Will Never Set) (1962)
- Il Figlio di Spartacus (TheSlave(1962 film)) (1962) as Mardok
- El Akh el kabir (The Big Brother) (1959) with Farid Shawki and Hind Rostom
- Forever Yours (1959)
- Seraa maal hayat (Struggle for Life) (1958)
- Ismail Yassin Fee El Ostool (Ismail Yassin in the Navy) (1957)with Ismail Yasin
- Ibn Hameedo (The Son of Hameedo) (1957) with Ismail Yasin and Hind Rostom
- Tamr henna (Tamarind) (1957) with Naima Akef, Fayza Ahmad and Rushdy Abaza
- Banat el yom (Girls of Today) (1957) with Abdel Halim Hafez and Magda El Sabahy
- El Wessada el khalia (The Empty Pillow) (1957) with Abdel Halim Hafez and Lobna Abdel Aziz
- Al-Qalb Lahu Ahkam (The Heart Has Its Reasons) (1956) with Faten Hamama
- Hob wa Dumoo` (Love and Tears) (1956) with Faten Hamama
- Sira` Fi al-Mina (Dark Waters) (1956) with Omar Sharif and Faten Hamama
- Ayyamna al-Holwa (Our Best Days) (1955) with Abdel Halim Hafez, Omar Sharif and Faten Hamama
