= Zubaida Tharwat =

Egyptian actress (1940–2016)

- زبيدة ثروت
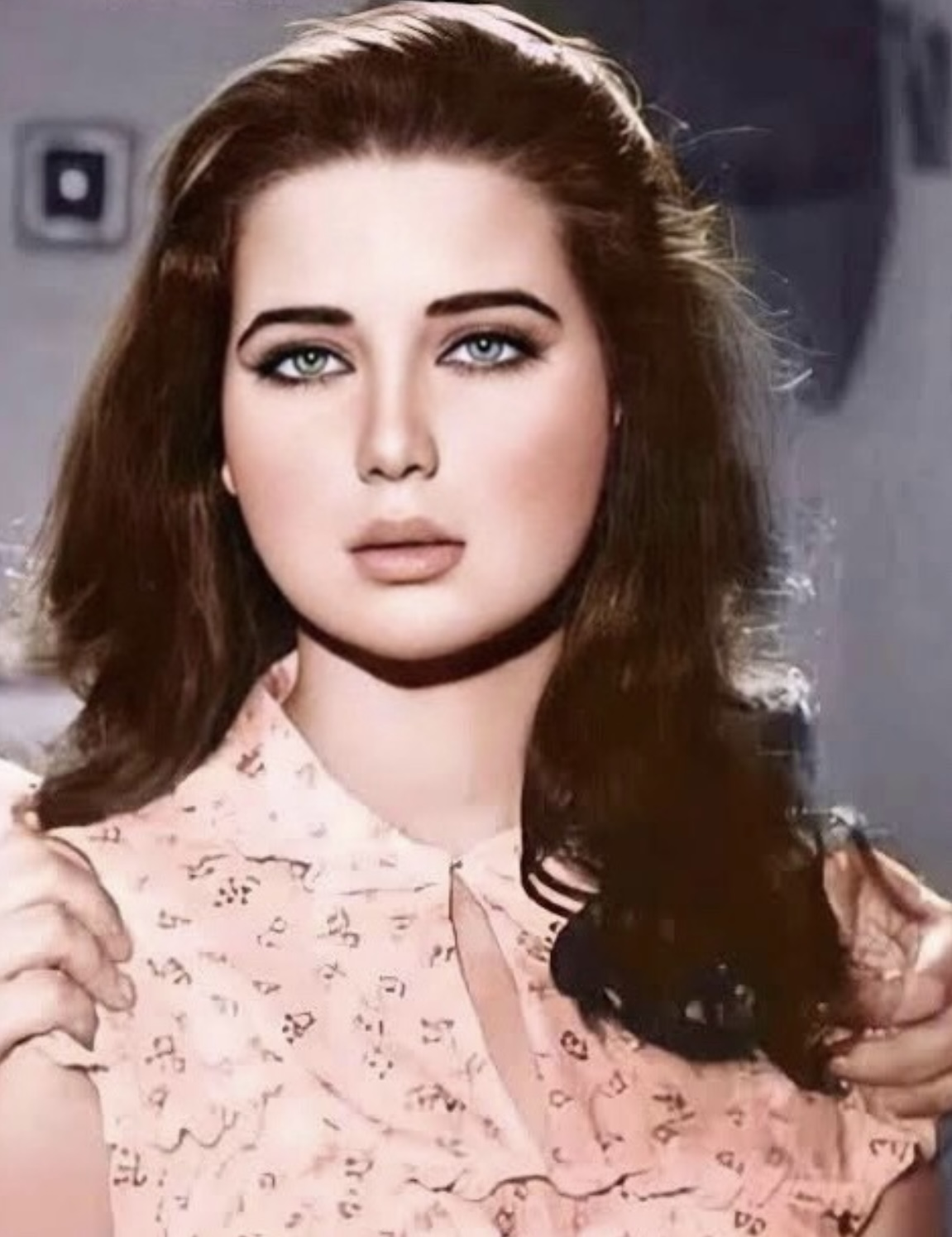
- Tharwat in 1960
- Born: Zubaida Ahmed Tharwat; 15 June 1940; Alexandria, Kingdom of Egypt
- Died: 13 December 2016 (aged 76); Cairo, Egypt
- Other name: "The most beautiful eyes in classic Egyptian cinema"
- Education: University of Alexandria
- Occupation: Actress
- Years active: 1956–1985
- Spouses: Ihab El-Ghazawi (m. 1960, divorced) Sobhi Farhat (divorced) Mohamed Ismail (divorced) Omar Nagi (divorced)
- Children: 4

Zubaida Ahmed Tharwat (Arabic: زبيدة أحمد ثروت; 15 June 1940 – 13 December 2016), was an Egyptian film, stage and television actress. She started her acting career in 1956, and quickly rose to stardom in Egypt. After six years hiatus in the 1960s, she returned to acting in 1969, and retired in the 1980s. Tharwat was known as "the most beautiful eyes in classic Egyptian cinema".

Tharwat was born into a prominent Egyptian family in Alexandria. She won a beauty contest in an Egyptian teen magazine in 1955, which widely published her photograph and brought her attention of filmmakers in the Egyptian film industry. Tharwat made her film debut in Dalila (1956) and gained stardom from her roles in Hekayt 3 Banat (1957), El-Malak el-Sagheir (1957), and Bent 17 (1958).

During the late 1950s, Tharwat established herself as a leading lady and one of the era's top stars with films like A'ashat lelhob (1959), Shams La Tagheeb (1959), Ehtrsi mn el-Hob (1959). In one year, she starred in Inni Attahem (1960), opposite Salah Zulfikar, Youm min Omri (1961), opposite Abdel Halim Hafez, followed by There is a Man in our House (1961), opposite Omar Sharif, and all films were commercially successful. After seven years hiatus from film, she returned by starring in How to Get Rid of Your Wife (1969). In the 1970s, she also had notable roles in; El-Hob El-Daea (1970), The Other Man (1973), and The Guilty (1975).

== Early life ==
Zubaida was born in Alexandria, Egypt on 15 June 1940, into an Egyptian family. Her father, Ahmed Tharwat, was an Egyptian Navy officer. As a teenager, she won a beauty contest in an Egyptian teen magazine which widely published her photograph and got her the attention of directors and producers. She studied at the Faculty of Law, Alexandria University.

== Career ==
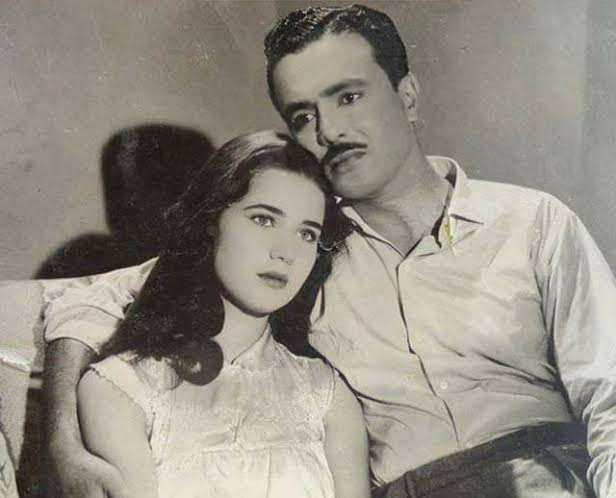
Tharwat with Salah Zulfikar in Inni Attahim (1960)

After winning a beauty contest organized by El-Geel magazine in 1955, Tharwat made her film debut in Dalila (1956). She subsequently appeared in Women in My Life (1957), The Little Angel (1957), Girl 17 (1958), Inni Attahim (1960), There is a Man in our House (1961) and Youm Min Omry (1961).

After an acting hiatus from 1962 to 1969, she appeared in the films Zawga Ghayoora Gedan (1969), How to Get Rid of Your Wife (1969), El-Hob El-Daea' (1970), Me, My Wife and the Secretary (1970) Hadset Sharaf (1971), and Shams w Dabab (1973).

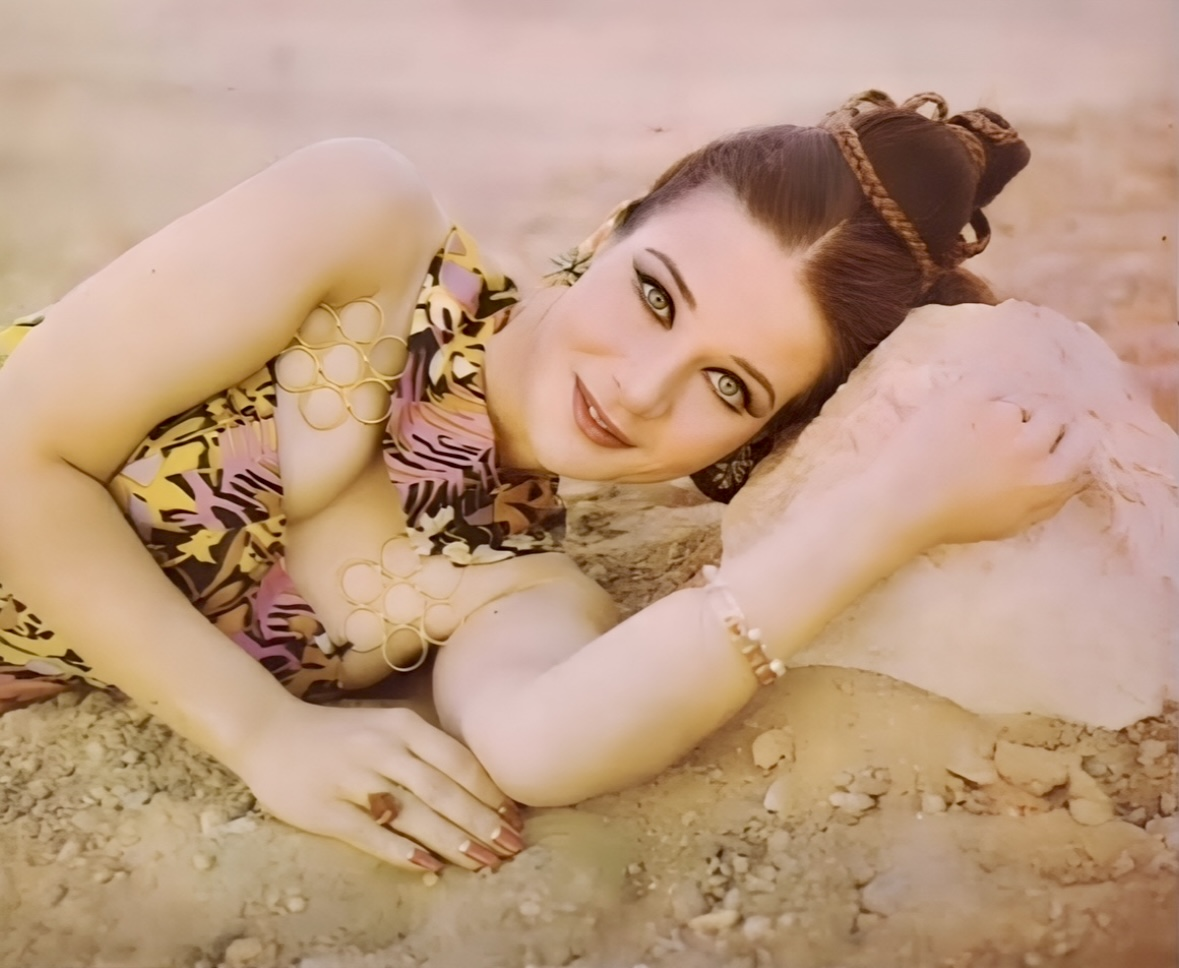
Tharwat in 1970

In 1973, she appeared alongside box-office star Salah Zulfikar in Al-Rajul Al-Akhar (1973) and the film was a box-office success. She also starred alongside singer and actor Farid Al-Atrash in Zaman Ya Hub (1973). She had a notable role in Al-Mothneboon (1975) among other works on stage such as; Shahrzad we 8 staat and 20 Farkha we deek, both in 1977. In 1976, Tharwat starred in Lkaa' Honak, and her last film was Zahret el-Banafseg (1977). Tharwat starred in only one television miniseries; Wafaa' Belaa Nhaaya, aired for the first time in 1978.

She starred in the play Ana we Heya we mrati (1978). One of her last works in which she participated was a play; A Very Happy Family (1985) with Amin El-Hunaidi and El-Muntaser Billah, written and directed by El Sayed Badir. She also starred in her last play; Meen Ye'dar ala reem (1987) and decided to retire in the same year. During her career, she was given many nicknames such as "The Pussycat of Arabic Cinema", Magic Eyes and "The Queen of Romance".

== Personal life and death ==
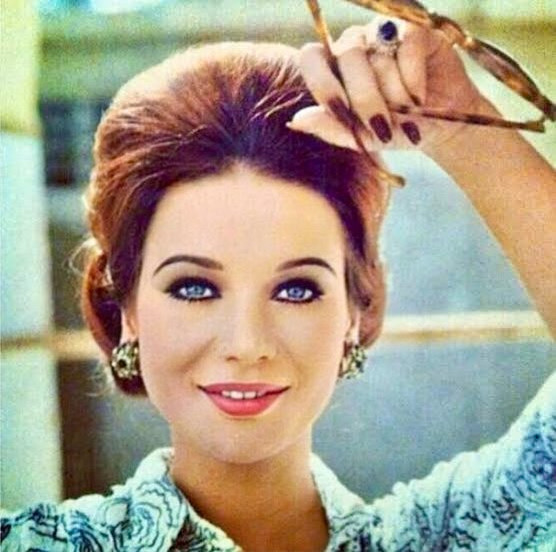
Zubaida Tharwat in 1975

Tharwat had 3 siblings, including her twin sister Hikmet. She got married five times, her first marriage was in 1960 to an officer in the Egyptian Navy named Ihab El-Ghazawi, then the Syrian producer Sobhi Farhat, with whom she gave birth to her four daughters.

Her third husband was Mohamed Ismail. Tharwat's last husband, the actor Omar Nagi, which was her last marriage. She stated in her last interview that she did not know that Abdel Halim Hafez had proposed to her, he asked to marry just after her second marriage, and she recommended that she be buried next to him after she dies. After retiring from films, she made the decision to migrate to the United States, and lived there for a while, but eventually returned to Egypt and died at the age of 76 in Cairo after a long battle with cancer and aging-associated diseases.

== Filmography ==
=== Film ===
Year	Title	Role	Notes
1956	Dalila		
1956	Hekayt 3 Banat	Shahira	
1957	El-Malak el-Sagheir	Doha	
1957	Nessa' fi Hayati	Sanaa'	
1958	Bent 17	Safaa'	
1959	A'ashat lelhob	Zeinab	
1959	Shams La Tagheeb	Soha	
1959	Ehtrsi mn el-Hob	Laila	
1960	Inni attahem	Naemat	
1961	Yum mn omri	Nadya	
1961	Nesf Azraa'	Zeinab	
1961	Fi Baituna Ragol	Nawaaal	
1962	Salwa fi mahab el-reeh	Salwa	
1969	Zawga Ghayoora Gedan	Fatma	
1969	Kaifa ttakhalas mn zawgatak	Fatma	
1970	El-Hob El-Daea'	Samya	
1970	Ana we Zawgti we el-Sekrtera		
1971	Hadest Sharaf		
1973	Shams w Dabab		
1973	Zaman Ya Hob	Abeer	
1973	Al-Rajul Al-Akhar		
1974	Al-Ahdan Al-Dafe'a	Madiha	
1975	Habebe Magnon Gdn		
1975	El-Mothneboon	Mona	
1975	La Shy' yohem		
1976	El-Hob el-Haram	Aydaa	
1976	Lkaa' Honak	Laila	
1977	Zahret el-Banafseg	Hayaat	

=== Theatre ===
Year	Title	Role	Notes
1977	Shahrzad we 8 staat		
1977	20 Farkha we deek		
1980	8 staat		
1985	Aaa'ela Sa'eeda Gedaan		
1987	Ana we Heya we mrati		
1987	Meen Ye'dar ala reem		

=== Television ===
Year	Title	Role	Notes
1978	Wafaa' Belaa Nhaaya		
