= Inni Attahim =

- Arabic: إني أتهم
- Directed by: Hassan el-Imam
- Written by: Hassan el-Imam
- Screenplay by: Hassan el-Imam; Mohamed Othman; Mohammed Mostafa Samy
- Starring: Zubaida Tharwat; Salah Zulfikar; Emad Hamdy
- Cinematography: Alvise Orfanelli
- Edited by: Kamal Abu El-Ela
- Music by: Atteya Sharara
- Production company: Mansoura Films
- Distributed by: United Cinema
- Release date: 4 January 1960 (Egypt)
- Running time: 111 minutes
- Country: Egypt
- Language: Egyptian Arabic

Inni Attahim (English: I Accuse, Arabic: إني أتهم, aka: Inni Attahem) is a 1960 Egyptian film written and directed by Hassan el-Imam. The script is written by Hassan el-Imam, Mohamed Othman and Mohammed Mostafa Samy. It stars Zubaida Tharwat, Salah Zulfikar and Emad Hamdy. The film was produced by Mansoura Films and released on January 4, 1960 by United Cinema.

== Synopsis ==
Naima and Salah fall in Love, Salah works as a journalist. Unfortunately, Naima became paralyzed after an accident. Her father, the teacher, Saber, is fired from his job following after an argument between him and his manager Hamed who had a relationship with Souad, the sister of his friend Abbas, the prosecutor. Abbas tries to convince Hamed to marry Souad but he refuses, and Saber tried to help with no success.

== Cast ==
- Zubaida Tharwat as Naima
- Salah Zulfikar as Salah
- Emad Hamdy as Abbas
- Mohsen Sarhan as Saber
- Doria Ahmed as Zakeya
- Zizi El-Badrawi as Souad
- Tawfiq Al-Daqen as Sayed
- Salah Nazmi as Hamed
- Nagwa Fouad as Nagwa
- Kamal El Shennawi as Kamal
- Ahmed Luxor as Doctor
- Abbas El Daly as officer
- Souzy Khairy as dancer
- Mohamed Sobeih as the driver
- Metawe Eweis as informant
- Anwar Madkour as policeman

== See also ==
- Salah Zulfikar filmography
- List of Egyptian films of 1960
