= Wajh al-Qamar =

- وجه القمر
- Starring: Faten Hamama; Gamil Ratib; Ahmed Ramzy
- Country of origin: Egypt
- Original language: Arabic
- No. of episodes: 18 episodes

Production
- Production locations: Cairo, Egypt
- Camera setup: Multi-camera
- Running time: 40–42 minutes

Original release
- Release: November 2000 – December 2000

Wageh El Qamar (Arabic: وجه القمر, Face of the Moon) is a 2001 Egyptian soap opera mini-series. It was broadcast in the month of Ramadan on 23 Arabic TV channels. The series was hyped by the media, mainly because it marked the return of Egyptian actress Faten Hamama. An episode was aired every day for 35 days. It was directed by Adel El Aassar and was written by Magda Khayrallah. The series won the Best Series award in the Egyptian Radio and Television Festival in 2001.

== Synopsis ==
Ibtissam al-Bostany is a TV presenter and is a member of a perfect rich family. Her husband Karim Abul-Ezz is a successful businessman, and their three children, Sarah and Samah from Ibtissam's previous marriage, and Wael are all bright and ambitious. One day, Ibtissam's long-lost husband Mustafa Qura unexpectedly reappears, and messes all this perfection up. It turns out that he never died after all. Mustafa claims that Karim had killed him, or thought he had, when an arms deal they were both involved in went wrong. He was able to escape. Ibtissam didn't even know that Karim and Mustafa knew each other in the first place.

Ibtissam tries to conceal Mustafa's reappearance from her family, hoping he will just go away again and leave them alone. After all, Karim had brought up her two daughters like his own. But his reappearance is driving a wedge between her and her family, and everyone can tell there is something very wrong. Mustafa is bent on interfering in Samah and Sara's lives. In Sara's case, he makes her discover that her fiancé is a strange person who deals in stolen antiquities, and his lawyer helps get Sara discharged from custody after her fiancé intentionally leaves a precious artifact in her car and she is arrested. In Samah's case, he advises Ibtissam to stop rejecting Samah's boyfriend, Hashem, a pop star, who he finds out is a good guy. The girls keep seeing Mustafa, but whenever they ask Ibtissam who he is, she disavows even knowing who he is.

Mustafa tries desperately to get Ibtissam back. He goes to the courts to prove that her marriage to Karim is invalid because he is still alive. But to prove it's really him, he needs to get witnesses and people who knew him to swear in front of the courts that he is who he claims he is, but Karim is always getting to them first, and persuading them not to appear. Only Ibtissam can save him, and destroy her own marriage in the process, by swearing in front of the court. Sara and Samamh find out that Mustafa is really their long-lost father. Sara is enraptured, and moves out of the house to stay with him. Samah is a little less excited, but eventually comes around. To make matters even more complicated, Mustafa is dying of leukemia and needs a bone marrow transplant, which Sara selflessly volunteers for. His doctor, a young man, is impressed and asks her to marry him, and she agrees.

All this sets the scene for the series finale, which climaxes in Sara's wedding. Ibtissam urges Karim to go with her to the wedding. Karim refuses, as he doesn't want to face his former friend and current enemy. During the wedding, Mustafa gets ill and goes back to his hotel room. Karim shows up at the wedding and Ibtissam tells him to go see Mustafa. The two meet in the dark hotel room and finally face each other and their squalid past. Mustafa asks Karim why did he marry Ibtissam. Karim tells him that he loved her. Mustafa passes out. He has achieved what he came back for. He has become a part of his daughter's lives again, and is sure his wife is in good hands. Karim takes him to the hospital, and is the last person to see Mustafa alive.

In the show's final sequence, several years later, the family is all gathered happily at the table for iftar (breakfast in Ramadan), just like before. Except there are now new members of the family – the doctor and Sara's new child, Mustafa.

== Cast ==
- Faten Hamama as Ibtissam al-Bostany.
- Gamil Ratib as Karim Abul-Ezz.
- Ahmed Ramzy as Mustafa Qura.
- Ghada Adel as Sara.
- Nelly Karim as Samah.
- Omar Sharif, Jr. as Amun.
- Ahmed El Feshawy as Wael.
- Hassan Hosny as the doctor.
- Wael Nour as Hashem.
- Ola Ghanem

== Criticism ==
Although the series was popular and successful, there were some criticisms that it had received. The series was criticized for being far too preachy and moralistic. A Sawt Al-Umma article called it an "educational channel show that had gotten lost along the way and ended up on Channel 1."

Hamama, herself, was also a target of criticism. The Al-Wafd newspaper wrote:

"There's a cloud, or maybe it's fog, that appears every time Faten shows up, to the extent that a lot of people thought there was something wrong with their TVs."

The same Sawt Al-Umma article mentioned above wrote:

"Faten Hamama is like a soccer player who has been away from practice for a long time... the muscles have gone so stiff, the knees so rickety, and the chest so weak that he can no longer score goals except in his own net."
