= Qareat El Fengan =

Single by Abdel Halim Hafez

Qareat El Fengan قارئة الفنجان
- by Nizar Qabbani
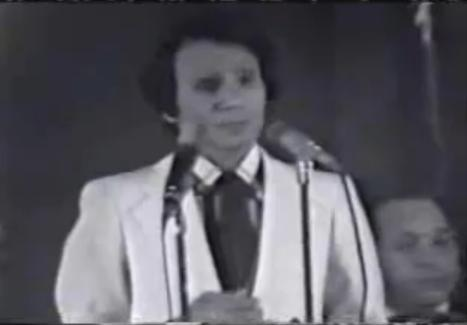
- Abdel Halim singing Qareat El Fengan in Damascus, 1976.
- Original title: قارئة الفنجان
- Written: Nizar Qabbani
- Language: Arabic
- Genre(s): Poetry, love poem, ghazal
- Meter: or

Qareat El Fengan (Arabic: قارِئةُ الفِنجان; "The Fortune Teller", literally "The Coffee Cup Reader") is a poem written by Nizar Qabbani and performed by Abdel Halim Hafez. He sang it for the first time in April 1976. The song is considered to be one of the classic Arabic songs and one of the most notable Abdel Halim Hafez songs. The song was composed by Mohammed Al-Mougui. In fact, Qareat El Fengan was the last recording by Abdel Hailm Hafez. It was recorded a year before his death, and he recorded it while he was in severe pain because of liver failure.

The subject is a fortune-teller (practising tasseography, by interpreting coffee grounds), who predicts an unhappy love.

Omar Offendum converted the poem into a hip-hop tune called "Finjan", and he mixed the original Arabic text with its translation. Also, in 2021, a series was produced under the name of the poem "Qareat El Fengan".
