= How to Get Rid of Your Wife =

- كيف تتخلص من زوجتك
- Directed by: Abdel Monem Shokry (primary); Kamal al-Homsani (clapboard); Ahmed Fouad and Maher Shafik (assistant directors)
- Written by: Bahgat Kamar
- Produced by: Fikri El Gohary (production assistant); Khalil Diab (executive producer)
- Starring: Zubaida Tharwat; Hassan Youssef; Hassan Mustafa; Mimi Gamal
- Cinematography: Muhammad Bakr
- Edited by: Abdulaziz Fakhry; Ibrahim Arayes (film coordinator); Samir Diaa El Din (assistant editor)
- Production company: Cult Studios
- Distributed by: United Film Company (Mohammed Shafei, domestic); Petra Films (international)
- Release date: August 18, 1969
- Running time: 75 minutes
- Country: Egypt
- Language: Egyptian Arabic

How to Get Rid of Your Wife (Arabic: كيف تتخلص من زوجتك, transliterated as “Kayf tatakhalas min zawjatik”) is an Egyptian romantic comedy film released in 1969. It was directed by Abdel Monem Shokry, features a script by Bahgat Kamar, and stars Zubaida Tharwat, Hassan Youssef, Hassan Mustafa and Mimi Gamal.

== Synopsis ==
Magdy is a famous movie star and a notorious womanizer. His friend, a famous author named Fikri Khafagy, helps write a speech he can use to break up with clingy women, which Magdy tries out on a lawyer named Suhair and a dentist named Nadia. Magdy fears that he would lose fans if he were to marry. At one of the wrap parties for his last movie in a night, Magdy meets a woman named Samiya, with whom he dances, drinks, passes out, and wakes up in bed the next morning asking her to leave, only for her to show him a marriage contract between them.

He and Fikri decide that Magdy cook up several schemes to call it off, the first of which is to warn her that he has a contagious disease (named here from the Arabic word for “ivy”), but her effort to send a doctor to make a house call risks the plan. Second, Magdy sets up a fake honeymoon in an abandoned, secluded house to terrorize her with the squabbles of a masked gang including Dabouk, Hillah, and Fokak; Samiya turns them in to a police officer (Mukhtar Al-Sayed), who thanks Magdy for the “help” apprehending them. Third, the duo slip testosterone into a drink to try and make her masculine, briefly hoarsening and deepening her voice, but the effect wears off quickly.

Warned by Suhair about Magdy’s duplicity, Samiya threatens to sue for infidelity with the publicity far more of a threat than any legal penalty, and this leads Magdy to acquiesce to Samiya’s requests to be her live-in butler essentially, doing household chores such as cooking and cleaning. In a last-ditch attempt to scotch the marriage, Magdy makes a deal to fake his death with Fikri framing Samiya as the shooter and helping her flee to Abu Qir. Suhair informs Samiya, who finally sends Magdy the divorce papers. But afterwards, Magdy misses her and falls in love, searching for her only to find her beside her mother and engaged resolutely to her cousin Hanafi. Suhair informs her soon that Magdy has attempted suicide, prompting police to swarm and Samiya to come back to him and reunite happily ever after.

== Cast ==
- Hassan Youssef (Magdy)
- Zubaida Tharwat (Samiya)
- Hassan Mustafa (Fikri)
- Mimi Gamal (Suhair)
- Fathia Shaheen (Samiya’s mother)
- Shahinaz (Nadia)
- Soheir Zaki
- Hassan Totala
- Ali Muhammad
- Farouk El Tatawy
- Mukhtar Al-Sayed
- Nawal Hashem
- Ahmed Abo Abeya
- Ahmed Maher Tekha (Hanafi)
- Hamdy Salem

== See also ==
- List of Egyptian films of 1969
- List of Egyptian films of the 1960s
