= Abdel Halim Hafez =

Egyptian musician and actor (1929–1977)

ORE Abdel Halim Hafez عبد الحليم حافظ
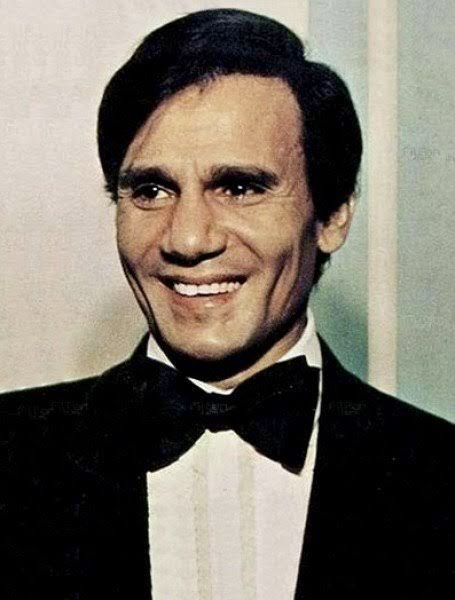
- Abdel Halim Hafez, 1970s

Background information
- Born: Abdel Halim Ali Shabana عبد الحليم علي شبانة; 21 June 1929; El-Halawat, El Sharqia, Kingdom of Egypt
- Died: 30 March 1977 (aged 47) London, England
- Genres: Egyptian music; classical Arabic music
- Occupations: Singer; actor; music teacher; conductor; film producer
- Years active: 1952–1977
- Labels: EMI Arabia; Mazzika

Abdel Halim Ali Shabana (Arabic: عبد الحليم علي شبانة; 21 June 1929 – 30 March 1977), commonly known as Abdel Halim Hafez (عبد الحليم حافظ, Egyptian Arabic pronunciation: [ʕæbd el ħæliːm ħɑːfɪzˤ]), was an Egyptian singer, actor, conductor, businessman, music teacher and film producer.

Abdel Halim is considered to be one of the greatest Egyptian musicians of his era, along with Umm Kulthum, Mohamed Abdel Wahab, Farid Al Atrach, Mohamed Fawzi, and Shadia. As his popularity grew, he was given the nickname 'el-Andaleeb el-Asmar (Arabic: العندليب الأسمر), meaning The Brown-Skinned Nightingale. He achieved extraordinary success as a popular musician throughout the Arab world, with estimated sales of over 80 million records.

== Early life ==
Born Abdel Halim Ali Shabanah in El-Halawat in El Sharqia, 80 kilometers (50 miles) north of Cairo, he was the fourth child of Ali Ismail Shabanah. He had two brothers, Ismail and Mohamed, and one sister, Alyah. His mother died from labor complications three days after giving birth to him – something that made people around him believe that he brought bad luck. His father died as well a few months later, leaving him and his siblings orphaned at a young age. He lived in a poor orphanage for a number of years. He was later raised by his aunt and uncle in Cairo. During these years Abdel Halim was extremely poor.

Abdel Halim's musical abilities first became apparent while he was in primary school and his older brother Ismail Shabanah was his first music teacher. At the age of 14 he joined the Arabic Music Institute in Cairo and became known for singing the songs of Mohammed Abdel Wahab. He dropped out from the Higher Theatrical Music Institute as an oboe player.

== Musical career ==
In the very beginning, Abdel Halim worked as a teacher of music at schools in Tanta and El-Mahalla El-Kubra. While singing in clubs in Cairo, Abdel Halim was drafted as a last-minute substitute when the singer Karem Mahmoud was unable to sing a scheduled live radio performance in 1953.

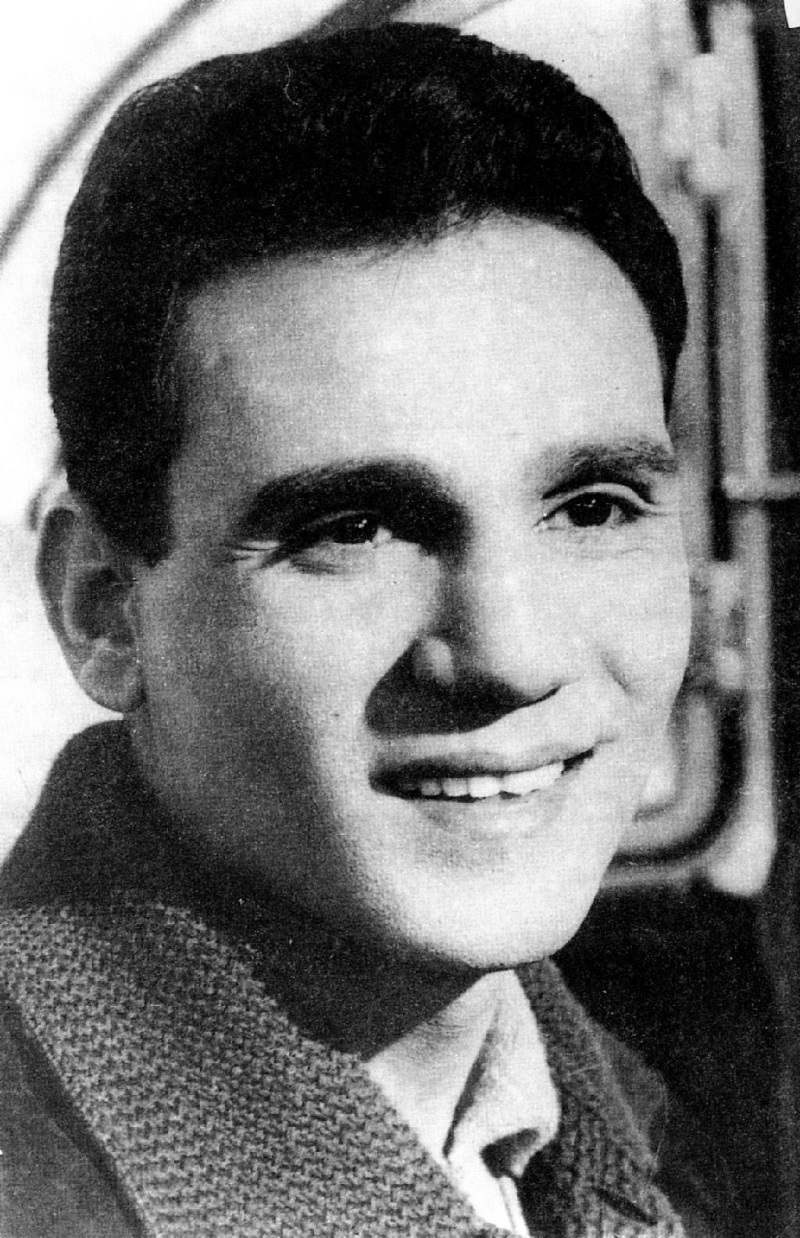
Abdel Halim Hafez in the late 1950s

Abdel Halim's performance was heard by Hafez Abdel Wahab, the supervisor of musical programming for Egyptian national radio. Abdel Halim took 'Hafez', Abdel Wahab's first name, as his stage-surname in recognition of his patronage. In the early days of his career, Abdel Halim was rejected for his new style of singing. However he persisted and was able to gain accolades later on. Eventually, he became a singer enjoyed by all generations. In collaboration with composer Mohammed Abdel Wahab, Abdel Halim went on to produce many popular love songs such as Ahwak ("I adore you"), Nebtedi Minen el Hekaya ("Where should we start the story"), and Fatet Ganbena( "She passed by us"). Hafez also worked with Egyptian poet Mohamed Hamza on songs including Zay el Hawa ("It feels like love"), Sawah ("Wanderer"), Hawel Teftekerni ("Try to remember me"), Aye Damiet Hozn ("Any tear of sadness"), and Maw'ood ("Destined").

During his career, he was very popular and always performed in sold-out arenas and stadiums. Despite his popularity, he rarely released a studio album since he worked purely as a live singer. He also played many different instruments, including the oboe, drums, piano, oud, clarinet and guitar. He was involved in all aspects of the composition of his songs. Halim introduced many new instruments to the Arab world. He was known for his deep passion in his songs and his unique voice.

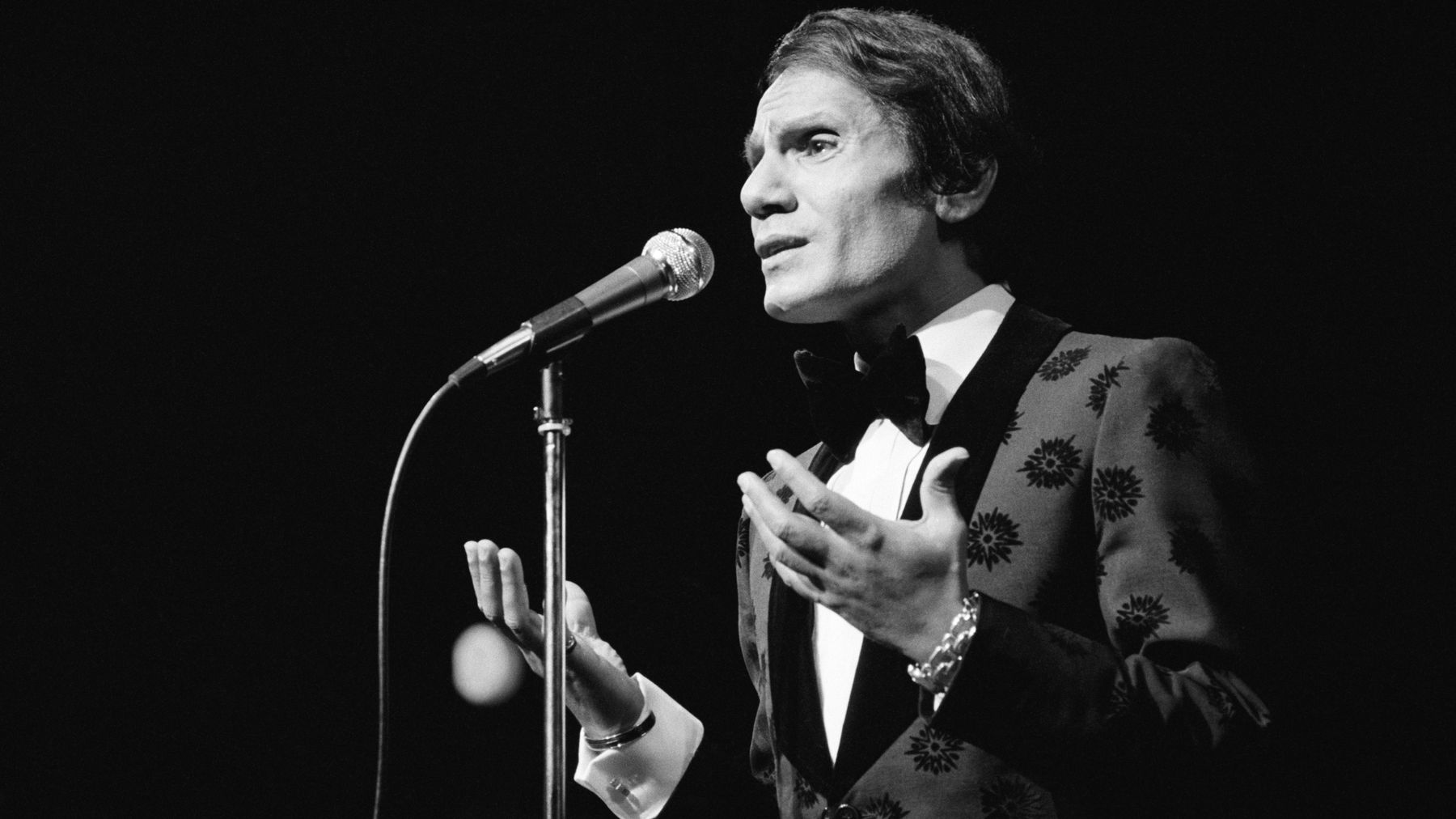
Halim performing in Paris, 1974

Halim performed in almost every country in the Arab world as well as outside the Arab world, including several concerts in Europe. Moreover, he sang uplifting patriotic songs for not only his native Egypt whom he dedicated the supermajority of his patriotic songs, but also there are some few songs dedicated to other countries in the Arab world such as Lebanon, Syria, Tunisia, Algeria and Morocco during their revolutions and wars. He used to encourage and help many young artists and actors to pursue successful careers. His entire catalogue was acquired by the Mazzika group in the early 2010s after the sale and break-up of EMI.

== Fame ==
In Egypt, Halim is known as the "King of Music", "The Son of Nile", "The voice of the people", "The son of the revolution", and "King of emotions and feelings". His patriotic songs were the most frequent songs sung by the crowds during the Egyptian Revolution of 2011.

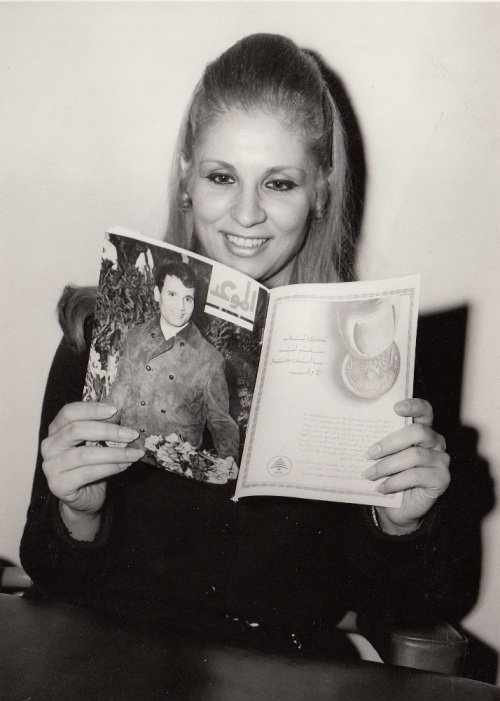
Singer Sabah reading El Mawed magazine with Abdel Halim Hafez on the cover, 1966

One of the revolutionaries in the Egyptian Revolution of 2011 said "the nightingale's songs inspired us during the January 25 revolution" and "Although he died 35 years ago, his songs will surely continue to inspire his fellow Egyptians for many generations to come". His albums have sold more copies since his death than any other Arabic artist ever. His way of singing, the popularity of his songs and his behavior made him a role model for almost every modern singer in the entire region.

== Personal life ==
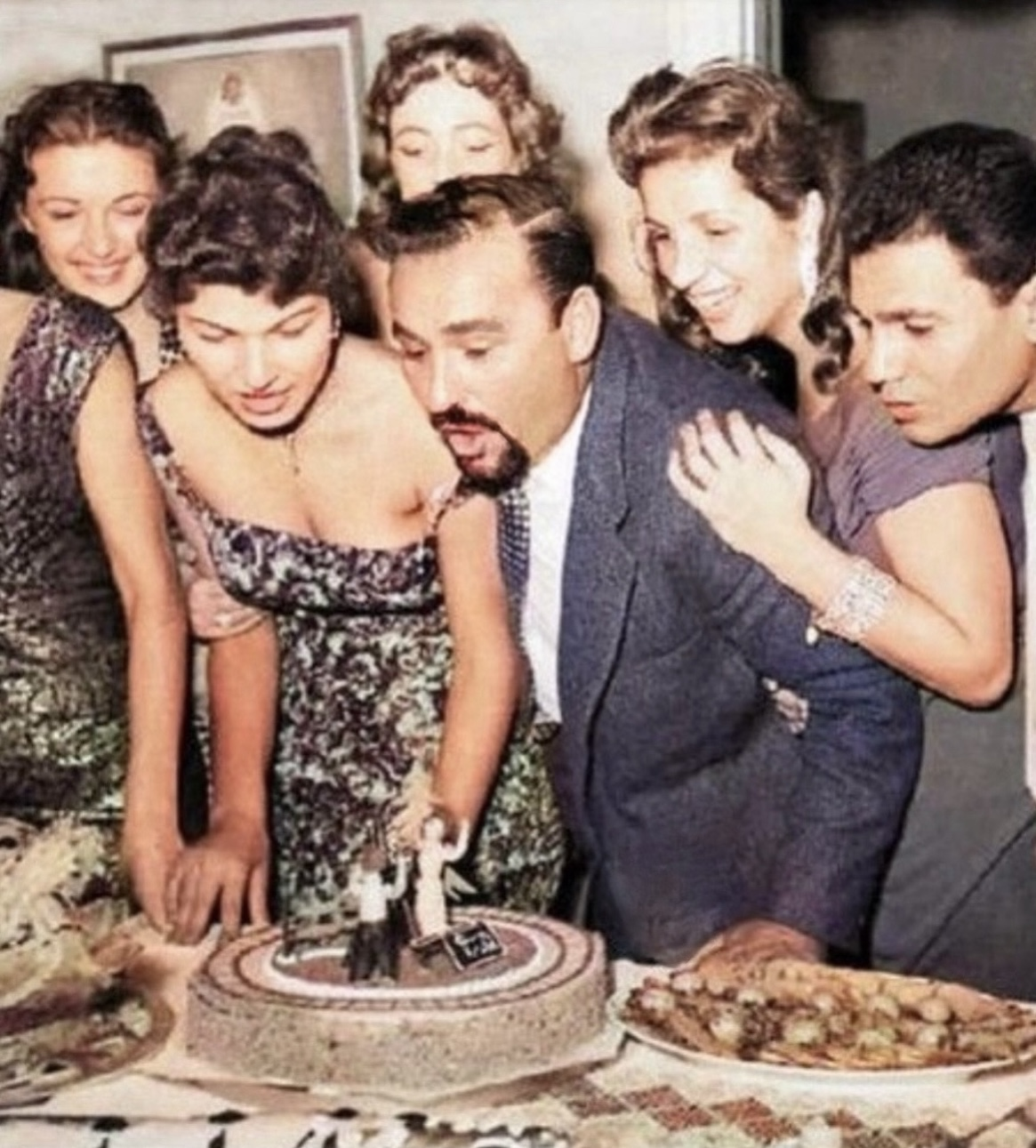
Hafez (on right) along with Sabah, Huda Sultan, Kawthar Shafik and Mariam Fakhr Eddine celebrating Ezz El-Dine Zulficar's birthday, 1959

At the age of 11, Abdel Halim contracted schistosomiasis—a common parasitic waterborne disease those days—and was afflicted by it for most of his career. Despite this, he remained positive and continued composing and performing his songs.

Although Abdel Halim never married, it was rumoured that he was secretly married to actress Soad Hosni for six years. This has never been proven to date. People who were close to both singers denied this rumor.

In 1969, Halim built a hospital in Egypt. He treated the poor, the rich, and presidents equally in the Arab World.

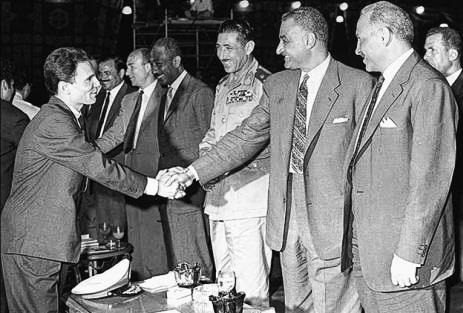
Hafez shaking hands with President Gamal Abdel Nasser, with whom he was friends, 1958

Abdel Halim established strong friendships with many contemporary presidents and kings of the Eastern world, including Gamal Abdel Nasser of Egypt, and King Hassan II of Morocco. He also had very close friendships with most Egyptian poets.

== Illness ==
Abdel Halim Hafez was afflicted with cirrhosis of the liver caused by schistosomiasis, and this cirrhosis was the cause of his death in 1977. He knew about this disease for the first time in 1956 when he was invited to have dinner with his friend Mustafa Al-Areef during the Holy month of Ramadan by where he had stomach bleeding.

== Death ==
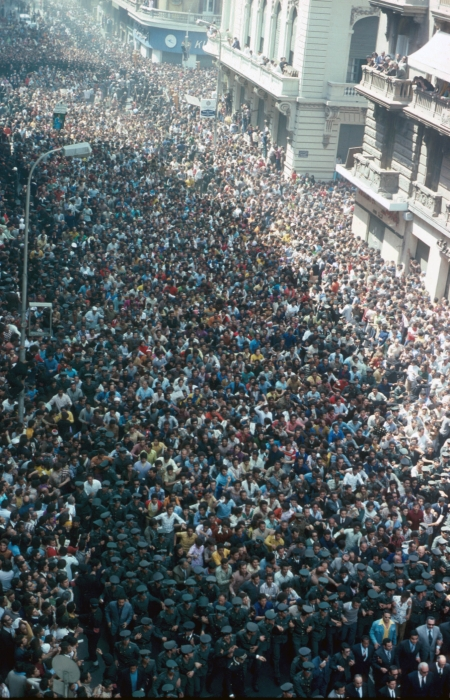
Crowds attending the funeral of Abdel Halim Hafez in Cairo

Abdel Halim died of liver failure as a complication from Schistosoma mansoni (reference St. George's University School of Medicine) on 30 March 1977 (a few months before his 48th birthday) while undergoing treatment for Bilharzia in King's College Hospital, London.

His funeral in Cairo was attended by tens of thousands of people Halim was reported to have had many more dreams and goals that he wanted to achieve, though his early death prevented him from doing so. In the wake of Halim's passing, it was documented people committed suicide, including at least four women committing suicide by jumping off a balcony during his funeral march. He was buried in Al Bassatin Cemetery in Cairo.

== Honours ==
Country	Honour
Egypt	Order of the Republic (Grand Cordon)

== Legacy ==
Abdel Halim Hafez's song "Khosara" (Arabic: خسارة) received notice in the Western world in 1999 when elements from it were used for Jay-Z's recording "Big Pimpin'." Two complete bars from "Khosara" were rerecorded, not sampled, and used without permission from the song's producer and copyright holder, Magdi el-Amroussi. Jay-Z's use of an interpolation, rather than an actual sample, allowed him to avoid paying royalties for the use of the song.

Over 300 of Abdel Halim Hafez's songs were recorded and he starred in 16 classic and successful films, including Dalilah (دليله), which was the Middle East's first color motion picture.

Along with Mohammed Abdel Wahab and Magdi el-Amroussi, Abdel Halim was one of the main founders of the Egyptian recording company Soutelphan, which continues to operate to this day as a subsidiary of Mazzika

A feature film about his life, "Haleem", was released in 2006, starring Ahmad Zaki in the title role, produced by the Good News Group. In the same year a soap opera "Al-andaleeb hikayt shaab" was produced in Egypt with Shadi Shamel starring as Abdel Halim. Shamel won the lead role in a televised competition.

On 21 June 2011, Google celebrated his 82nd birthday with a Google Doodle.

On 19 April 2019, Lebanese singer Carole Samaha performed alongside a Pepper's ghost image of Abdel Halim Hafez at the Manara Hall in New Cairo. The concert, titled "Helm" (dream), was Egypt's first concert featuring a Pepper's ghost.

== Songs ==
Some of Halim's most popular songs are:

- "Ahwak" (I adore you),
- "Ala Ad El Sho'" (As much as the longing),
- "Ala Hesb Wedad" (Wherever my heart leads me),
- "Betlomooni Leih" (Why do you blame me),
- "El Massih" (Christ),
- "Fatet Ganbena" (She passed by us),
- "Gabbar" (Arrogant),
- "Gana El Hawa" (The mood struck us),
- "Sawwah" (Wanderer),
- "Maw'ood" (Destined),
- "Zai El Hawa" (Like passion),
- "Qari'at Al Fingan" (The coffee fortune-teller), his last song while alive
- "Habibati Man-Takoon" (My Love, Who Is She), released posthumously

== Patriotic songs ==
- 'The New Testament', written by Mahmoud Abdel Hai and composed by Abdel Hamid Tawfiq Zaki, was the first national anthem sung by Abdel Halim Hafez in 1952. Abdel Halim sang it after the July 23 revolution.
- 'We are the people' was the first song Abdel Halim sang to President Gamal Abdel Nasser after his election in 1956. This marked the first collaboration between Abdel Halim, Kamal Al-Taweel and Salah Jahin.
- 'God, our country' was the first collaboration between Mohamed Abdel-Wahab and Abdel Halim in the field of patriotic songs, also in 1956. Abdel Halim sang it after the Tripartite Aggression. 'On Its Land' or 'Christ's Song' is about Jerusalem.
- It was written by Abdel Rahman Al-Abnoudi, composed by Baligh Hamdi, and arranged by Ali Ismail.
- 'Your Son Says You're a Hero' was written by Abdul Rahman Al-Abnoudi and composed by Kamal Al-Taweel.
- 'The Greater Homeland Anthem', written by Ahmed Shafiq Kamel and composed by Mohamed Abdel Wahab, was released in 1960.
- 'The Story of a People', also written by Ahmed Shafiq Kamel, was composed by Kamal Al-Taweel for the 'Adwaa Al-Madina' party held in Aswan to celebrate the laying of the foundation stone for the construction of the High Dam.
- 'Matalib Shaab' was written by Ahmed Shafiq Kamel and composed by Kamal Al-Taweel for the tenth commemoration of the revolution on 23 July 1962. He sang "Sourah" on Revolution Day on 23 July 1966.
- It was written by Salah Jaheen and composed by Kamal Al-Taweel. In 1967, he sang "Aadah Al-Nahar", one of Abdel Halim's most prominent songs, written by Abdel Rahman Al-Abnoudi and composed by Baligh Hamdi.
- In 1967, he sang "I swear by its name", promising to perform it at all his concerts until Egypt was liberated in Sinai. It was written by Abdel Rahman Al-Abnoudi and composed by Kamal Al-Taweel. 'The Gun Talk' was written by Abdel Rahman Al-Abnoudi and composed by Kamal Al-Taweel in 1968. 'Aash lih Aal' was the first song Abdel Halim sang after the October Victory of 1973.
- It was written by Mohamed Hamza and composed by Baligh Hamdi, and it was the first song in which Abdel Halim praised President Mohamed Anwar Sadat's role in Egypt's great victory. 'Good Morning, Sinai' was another collaboration between Abdel Halim and Kamal Al-Taweel in 1974. 'Al Najmah Malet Ala Amar' (1975) was written by Mohsen Al-Khayat and composed by Muhammad Al-Mouji. 'The Boat is Back' was written by Mustafa Al-Damrani and composed by Muhammad Abdel Wahab after the Suez Canal reopened to global navigation.

== Religious invocations ==
- "Nafadet Einayah Almanamm" (My eyes shook the dream)
- "Ana min al tourab" (I am from dust)
- "Ala Toutah" (On the raspberry)
- "Adaaouka Ya Samaah" (I call you, Listener)
- "Wa Rahmatoka fi Nasim" (And your mercy in the breeze")
- "Bayneh wa Bayn Al nas" (Between me and the people)
- "Wa Habeh fih Al-ared" (And the grain in the earth)
- "Khalineh Kelmah" (Let me a word)
- "Waraa Al shajar" (Tree leaves)
- "Bayna Sohbat Al Ward" (Among the company of Roses)
- "Ya Khalek Alward" (The Creator of the flowers)

All of theses religious invocations were written by the poet Abdel-Fattah Mustafa, and composed by Muhammad Al-Mouji.

== Filmography ==
Abdel Halim Hafez and Mervat Amin in Abi Foq El Shagara (1969)

Title	Release Date	Role	Co-stars	Director	Notes
Lahn El Wafa' (The Song of Faithfulness)	1 March 1955	Galal	Shadia	Ibrahim Amara	Abdel Halim Hafez co-directed
Ayyamna al-Holwa (Our Beautiful Days)	1 March 1955	Ali	Faten Hamama, Omar Sharif, Ahmed Ramzy	Helmy Halim	
Ayam We Layali (Days and Nights)	8 September 1955	Yehia	Eman	Henry Barakat	
Mawed Gharam (Love Rendez-vous)	3 January 1956	Samir	Faten Hamama	Henry Barakat	
Dalila	20 October 1956	Ahmed	Shadia	Mohamad Karim	This was Egypt's first movie to be in Cinemascope
Layali el hub	1956		Abdel Halim Hafez	Helmy Rafla	
Banat El Yom (The Girls of Today)	10 November 1957	Khaled	Magda, Amal Farid	Henry Barakat	Hafez performed the popular love song "Ahwak" for the first time in this film
Fata Ahlami (The Man of My Dreams)	7 March 1957	Adel	Amal Farid	Helmy Rafla	
Alwisada El Khalia (The Empty Pillow)	20 December 1957	Salah	Abdel Halim Hafez, Lubna Abed El Aziz	Salah Abu Yousef	The song Asmar Y'Asmarani was performed in this movie by Faeza Ahmed. Halim performed Awel Marra in this movie.
Share' El Hob (Love Street)	5 March 1958	Abd-El Moneim	Sabah	Ezz El-Dine Zulficar	
Hekayit Hob (A Love Story)	12 January 1959	Ahmed Sami	Mariam Fakhr Eddine	Helmy Halim	
El Banat Wel Seif (Girls and Summer)	5 September 1960	Mohamed	Suad Husni, Zizi El Badrawi	Salah Abu Yousef, Ez El Deen Zol Faqar, Fateen Abed El Wahhab	This movie consisted of 3 stories. Abdel Halim Hafez acted in one of these.
Yom Men Omri (A Day of My Life)	8 February 1961	Salah	Zubaida Tharwat	Atef Salem	
El Khataya (The Sins)	12 November 1962	Hussien	Madiha Yousri, Hassan Youssef (actor), Nadia Lutfi	Hassan El Imam	Featured the songs Wehyat Alby, Maghroor, Last Adry, Olly Haga, and El Helwa
Maabodat El Gamahir (The Beloved Diva)	9 January 1967	Ibrahim Farid	Shadia	Helmy Halim	Featured the songs Haga Ghareeba, Balash Etaab, Last Kalby, Gabbar, and Ahebek
Abi Foq El Shagara (My Father Atop a Tree)	17 February 1969	Adel	Nadia Lutfi, Mervat Amin	Hussein Kamal	Featured the songs Ady El Belag, El Hawa Hawaya, Ahdan El Habayeb, Ya Khali El Alb, and Gana El Hawa. Hafez also produced this movie and was the last film in which he appeared. This movie is still the longest running motion picture in movie theaters in the Arab world to date., (Last appearance)
