= Samir Sabry =

Egyptian footballer (born 1976)

Personal information
- Full name: Samir Sabry Abdou
- Date of birth: 13 January 1976 (age 50)
- Place of birth: Egypt
- Position: Midfielder

Senior career*
Years	Team	Apps	(Gls)
2002–2008	ENPPI Club		
2008-2009	Asyut Petroleum		

International career
2000–2004	Egypt futsal	9	(2)
2005–2006	Egypt	3	(0)
- * Club domestic league appearances and goals

Samir Sabry Abdou (born 13 January 1976) is an Egyptian former footballer who played at both professional and international levels as a midfielder.

== Career ==
=== Club career ===
Sabry played club football for ENPPI Club and Asyut Petroleum.

=== International career ===
Sabry earned three caps for between 2005 and 2006, and was a member of the squad for the 2006 African Cup of Nations.

He also represented Egypt at the Futsal World Cup in 2000 and 2004, scoring 2 goals in 9 appearances.
