= Soutelphan =

- Founded: 1961
- Founder: Mohamed Abdel Wahab; Magdi el-Amroussi; Abdel Halim Hafez
- Distributor: Universal Music MENA
- Genre: Arabic Music
- Location: Cairo, Egypt

Soutelphan or Sawt el Fan is an Egyptian recording company founded in 1961, by Mohamed Abdel Wahab, Magdi el-Amroussi and Abdel Halim Hafez (1929–77). It is distributed by Universal Music MENA, and recording artists include Abdel Halim Hafez and Ahmed Adaweyah.
