= Love and Tears =

1955 film

Hob wa Dumoo` حب و دموع
- Hob wa Dumoo` poster
- Directed by: Kamal El Sheikh
- Written by: Ali El Zorkani; Mahmoud Sobhi
- Produced by: Faten Hamama
- Starring: Faten Hamama; Zaki Rostom; Ahmed Ramzy; Aqila Ratib
- Distributed by: Dollar Film
- Release date: 1955
- Running time: 105 minutes
- Country: Egypt
- Language: Arabic
- Box office: 32 million tickets (Soviet Union)

Hob wa Dumoo` (Arabic: حب و دموع, English: Love and Tears) is a 1955 Egyptian romance drama film directed by Kamal El Sheikh. It stars Ahmed Ramzy, Zaki Rostom, and Faten Hamama.

The film was a blockbuster in the Soviet Union, where it sold 32 million tickets at the box office in 1957.

== Plot ==
Faten Hamama plays Fatimah, a woman who is forced to leave her fiance for an old man to whom her father is in debt. Her father kills the man but is also killed himself. She is forced to work in a cabaret but returns to her love, Ahmed.

== Main cast ==
- Faten Hamama as Fatimah
- Ahmed Ramzy as Ahmed
- Zaki Rostom
- Aqila Ratib
