= Helmy Halim =

Egyptian film director (1916–1971)

- Born: 1916
- Died: 1971 (aged 54–55)
- Occupation: film director . screenwriter . producer.

Helmy Halim, also Hilmi Halim (Arabic: حلمي حليم; 1916 – 1971) was an Egyptian film director, screenwriter, and producer. He has worked with many stars like Omar Sharif, Salah Zulfikar, Ahmed Ramzy, Faten Hamama and Abdel Halim Hafez.

In 1955, he discovered Ahmed Ramzy and cast him as Ramzy in Ayyamna al-Holwa

== Partial filmography ==
- Ayyamna al-Holwa
- Ard al-Salam
- Hekayit Hob (A Love Story), released: January 12, 1959, starring: Abdel Halim Hafez, Mariam Fakhr Eddine
- Maww'ed fil Borg (Date at the Tower), released: December, 1962, starring: Salah Zulfikar, Soad Hosny.
- Maabodat El Gamahir (The Beloved Diva), released: January, 1967, starring: Abdel Halim Hafez, Shadia.
