= Salah Zulfikar filmography =

List of performances by the Egyptian actor Salah Zulfikar

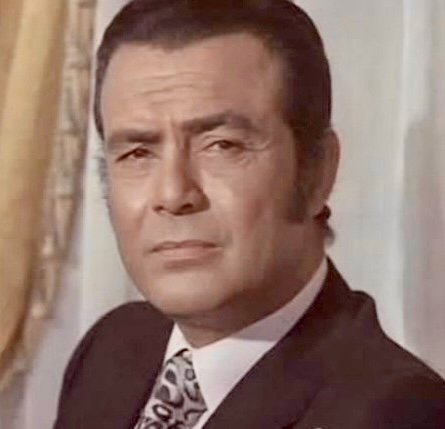
- Zulfikar in 1972
- Film: 135
- Television series: 58
- Radio show: 26
- Theatre: 23
- Others: 4 short films

Salah Zulfikar (1926–1993) was an Egyptian actor and film producer, who appeared in over 100 feature films, several short films, stage, television and radio serials. Zulfikar's film debut was in 1956 in a leading role becoming one of the most dominant leading men in Egyptian cinema. He starred in action, crime, war, drama, horror, romance, and romantic comedies.

Salah Zulfikar's film debut was in Wakeful Eyes (1956), and his successful career in film lasted into the 1990s. His film production career started in 1958, and he produced fourteen feature films. On the stage, Zulfikar's debut was in 1964’s A Bullet in the Heart based on Tawfik El Hakim’s novel. Afterwards, he starred in more than twenty plays in Cairo theatres. In television, his debut was in 1969's The Man with Five Faces, throughout his career, Zulfikar starred in more than fifty miniserieses.

He participated in over 250 artistic projects either cinematic, televised, radio or stage. He was a film producer and film, stage, television, and radio actor.

Salah Zulfikar produced five films and starred in ten, two of which as an actor and a producer with a total of thirteen films listed in the top 100 films in the centenary of Egyptian cinema. Zulfikar played all kind of roles in an impressive career spanning over thirty seven years.

== Feature films ==
=== Selected works ===
Year	English title	Original title	Role(s)	Director	Note(s)
1950s
1956	Wakeful Eyes	Uyoun Sahrana عيون سهرانة	Salah	Ezz El-Dine Zulficar	
1957	Return My Heart	Rod Qalby رد قلبي	Hussein Abdel Wahed	Ezz El-Dine Zulficar	
1958	Jamila, the Algerian	Gamila جميلة	Azzam	Youssef Chahine	
1959	Light of the Night	Nour El Leil نور الليل	Samy	Remon Nassour	
1959	Forbidden Women	Nessa’ Moharramat نساء محرمات	Ahmed	Mahmoud Zulfikar	
1959	Among the Ruins	Bain El Atlal بين الأطلال	Kamal	Ezz El-Dine Zulficar	Also producer
1959	The Second Man	El Ragol El Thany الرجل الثاني	Kamal/Akram	Ezz El-Dine Zulficar	Also producer
1960s
1960	Love and Adoration	Hob hatta El Ebada حب حتي العبادة	Hussein Abdel Hamid	Hassan Al Imam	
1960	Angel and Devil	Malak wa Sheitan ملاك وشيطان	Shawkat Selim	Kamal El Sheikh	Guest appearance, also producer
1960	Money and Women	Mal wa Nesaa مال ونساء	Hussein	Hassan Al Imam	
1960	A Scrap of Bread	Louqmat Al-Aych لقمة العيش	Mohsen	Niazy Mostafa	
1960	Woman's Secret	Serr Emra’a سر امرأة	Ahmed	Atef Salem	
1960	I Accuse	Inni Attahim إني أتهم	Salah	Hassan Al Imam	
1960	Holy Bond	Al Rabat Al Moqadas الرباط المقدس	Refaat Hamdy	Mahmoud Zulfikar	Also producer
1961	Wahida	Wahida وحيدة	Magdy	Mohammed Kamel Hassan	
1961	Rendezvous with the Past	Maww’ed Maa Al Maady موعد مع الماضي	Hamdy	Mahmoud Zulfikar	
1961	A Storm of Love	Asefa min Al Hob عاصفة من الحب	Hamed	Hussein Helmy El Mohandes	
1961	The Path of Heroes	Tareeq Al Abtal طريق الأبطال	Mamdouh	Mahmoud Ismail	
1961	Me and my daughters	Ana wa Banaty أنا وبناتي	Samir	Hussein Helmy El Mohandes	
1961	That’s What Love Is	El Hob Keda الحب كده	Hamdi	Mahmoud Zulfikar	
1962	A Date at the Tower	Maww'ed Fil-borg موعد في البرج	Adel Refaat	Ezz El-Dine Zulficar	Also producer
1962	All my Children	Kolohom Awlady كلهم أولادي	Salem	Ahmed Diaa Eddine	
1962	The Comic Society for Killing Wives	Gamaeat Qatl al-Zawgat al-Hazleya جمعية قتل الزوجات الهزلية	Mahmoud	Hassan El Sefy	
1962	The Cursed Palace	Al Qasr Al Malaaoon القصر الملعون	Hassan	Hassan Reda	
1963	Saladin the Victorious	Al Nasser Saladin الناصر صلاح الدين	Isaa Al Awam	Youssef Chahine	
1963	Soft Hands	Al Aydy Al Naema الأيدي الناعمه	Dr. Hamouda	Mahmoud Zulfikar	
1964	Runaway from life	Hareb Min Al Hayah هارب من الحياة	Dr. Kamel	Atef Salem	
1964	A Husband on Vacation	Zawg Fe Agaza زوج في إجازة	Essam Nour El Din	Mohamed Abdel Gawad	
1964	Secret of the Sphinx	La sfinge sorride prima di morire - Stop Londra	Ahmed	Duccio Tessari	Italian Film
1965	Dearer than my Life	Aghla min Hayaty أغلي من حياتي	Ahmed Hamdy	Mahmoud Zulfikar	
1966	My Wife, the Director General	Mirati Modeer Aam مراتي مدير عام	Hussein	Fatin Abdel Wahab	Also producer
1966	Three Thieves	3 Losoos ٣ لصوص	Mohsen	Fatin Abdel Wahab	Also producer
1966	A Wife from Paris	Zawga Min Paris زوجة من باريس	Dr. Wageeh	Atef Salem	
1967	My Wife's Dignity	Karamet Zawgaty كرامة زوجتي	Mahmoud Mokhtar	Fatin Abdel Wahab	
1968	My Wife's Goblin	Afreet Mirati عفريت مراتي	Saleh	Fatin Abdel Wahab	
1968	The Nile and the Life	El Nil wal Hayah النيل والحياة	Yehia	Youssef Chahine	
1968	The Man Who Lost His Shadow	El Ragol El-lazi fakad Zilloh الرجل الذي فقد ظله	Shawky	Kamal El Sheikh	
1968	Three Women	Thalath Nesaa ثلاث نساء	Adel	Mahmoud Zulfikar	
1969	Good Morning, My Dear Wife	Sabah El Kheir ya Zawgaty el Azeeza صباح الخير يا زوجتي العزيزة	Hassan	Abdel Moneim Shokry	
1969	Women's Market	Souq Al-Harim سوق الحريم	Essam	Youssef Marzouk	
1970s
1970	Sunset and Sunrise	Ghroob wa Shrooq غروب وشروق	Amin Akef	Kamal El Sheikh	
1970	Eye of Life	Ein El Hayah عين الحياة	Samy	Ibrahim El Shaqanqeery	
1970	Virgo	Borj El-Athraa برج العذراء	Fahmy Fathallah Fathy Feteha	Mahmoud Zulfikar	
1970	My Husband's Wife	Imra’at Zawgy امرأة زوجي	Adel	Mahmoud Zulfikar	
1971	A Touch of Tenderness	Lamset Hanan لمسة حنان	Ahmed	Helmy Rafla	
1971	A Woman of Fire	Emraa Min Naar امرأة من نار	Ahmed	Reda Meiser	
1971	The Killers	El Qatala القتلة	Adel Shawkat	Ashraf Fahmy	
1971	Confessions of a Woman	Eaterafat Emraa إعترافات امرأة	Ahmed	Saad Arafa	
1972	Featureless Men	Regal bela Malameh رجال بلا ملامح	Ahmed Fouad	Mahmoud Zulfikar	
1972	A Call for Life	Da'awa Lel Hayah دعوة للحياة	Mohsen	Medhat Bakeer	
1972	Unfulfilled Crime	Gareema Lam Taktamel جريمة لم تكتمل	Youssef	Nour El Demerdash	
1972	Paris and Love	Paris wal Hob باريس والحب	Aziz	Mohamed Salman	
1972	Those People of the Nile	Al Nass wal Nil الناس والنيل	Yehia Saeed	Youssef Chahine	
1973	Memory of a Night of Love	Zekra Lailat Hubb ذكري ليلة حب	Anwar	Seif El Din Shawkat	
1973	The Other Man	Al Ragol Al Akhar الرجل الآخر	Adel Abdelhamid	Mohamed Bassiouny	Also executive producer
1974	In Summer We Must Love	Fel Saif lazem Neheb في الصيف لازم نحب	Dr. Nabil	Mohamed Abdel Aziz	
1974	Dunya	Dunya دنيا	Sadek	Abdel Moneim Shokry	
1974	Enemy Brothers	Al Ekhwa Al Aadaa الأخوة الأعداء	Chief Prosecutor	Hossam El Din Moustafa	Guest appearance
1974	2 – 1 – 0	Etnein Wahed Sefr اتنين-واحد-صفر	Ali	Mohammed Fadel	
1975	The Guilty	Al Mothneboon المذنبون	Hafez bey	Said Marzouk	
1975	El Karnak	El Karnak الكرنك	Shoukry Member of Parliament	Ali Badrakhan	Special appearance
1976	A World of Children	Aalam Eyal Eyal عالم عيال عيال	Himself	Mohamed Abdel Aziz	Guest appearance
1978	Roadless Traveller	Mosafer bila Tareeq مسافر بلا طريق	Ashraf Hussein	Ali Abdel Khalek	
1978	Desire and Price	Al Raghba wal Thaman الرغبة والثمن	Mahmoud Police Detective	Youssef Shaaban Mohamed	
1979	Sin of an Angel	Khateea’t Malak خطيئة ملاك	Angel Saroot	Yehia El Alamy	
1980s
1981	A Moment of Weakness	Lahzet Da'af لحظة ضعف	Abdel Ghaffar Lotfy	Sayed Tantawy	
1981	Secret Visit	Zeyara Serreya زيارة سرية	Judge Ismail	Nagy Anglo	
1981	I'm Not Lying But I'm Beautifying	Ana la Akzeb wa lakeny Atagammal أنا لا أكذب ولكني أتجمل	Rafik Hamdy	Ibrahim El Shaqanqeery	Television film
1982	The Peacock	El Tawoos الطاووس	Dr. Hussein Abdel Raouf	Kamal El Sheikh	
1985	Adieu Bonaparte	Wadaan Bonaparte وداعا بونابارت	Cheikh Hassouna	Youssef Chahine	
1986	Please and Your Kindness	Min Fadlik wa Ihsanik من فضلِك وإحسانِك	Abdellatif	Nagy Anglo	Television film
1986	The Age of Wolves	Asr El Zeaa’b عصر الذئاب	Kamal Director of Police	Samir Seif	Guest appearance
1987	Mud	El Wahl الوحل	General Shawky	Ali Abdel Khalek	
1987	The Barefoot Millionaire	El Millionnaira El Hafya المليونيرة الحافية	Fadel Abulfadl	Nagy Anglo	Television film
1988	Red Mourning Clothes	Malabes El Hedad El Hamra ملابس الحداد الحمراء	Adel	Said Abdellah	Television film
1988	Days of Terror	Ayam El Roab أيام الرعب	El Hag Abdel Reheem	Said Marzouk	
1988	Unfortunately Woman	Imraa Lel Asaf امرأة للأسف	Saeed	Nadia Hamza	
1988	Love Also Dies	Al Hob Aydan Yamoot الحب أيضًا يموت	Moustafa Roshdy	Yehia El Alamy	Television film
1988	Monsieur le Directeur	Elosta El Modeer الأسطي المدير	Hassanein	Shafik Shameya	Television film
1988	Sorry For Bothering	Asef Lel Ezaag آسف للإزعاج	Refaat Sabry	Shafik Shameya	Television film
1989	Mr. Aliwa's Apartment	Shaaet El Ostaz Aliwa شقة الأستاذ عليوه	Fouad	Said Abdallah	Television film
1989	Betrayal	Khayana خيانة	General Shawkat	Sherief Hamouda	
1990s
1991	Wicked Game	Loubat Al Ashrar لعبة الأشرار	Riyad Kamel	Henry Barakat	
1992	The Accused	Al Mottahama المتهمة	Youssef	Henry Barakat	
1992	Anything but My Daughter	Ela Ibnaty إلا ابنتي	Mamdouh	Karim Diaa El Din	Television film
1993	Minister in Plaster	Wazeer fel Gebs وزير في الجبس	Gamil Burhan	Karim Diaa El Din	Television film
1993	Flames of Vengeance	Laheeb El Intiqam لهيب الإنتقام	El Hag Abdel Fadeel	Samir Seif	
1994	Five-Star Thieves	Losoos Khamas Nogoom لصوص خمس نجوم	Galal Suleiman	Ashraf Fahmy	
1994	Road to Eilat	Al Tareeq Ela Ilat الطريق إلي إيلات	Fouad Abu Zikry	Inaam Mohammed Ali	Special appearance
1994	The Terrorist	Al Irhabi الإرهابي	Dr. Abdel Moneim	Nader Galal	

== Short films ==
Year	English title	Original title	Role	Director	Note(s)
1967	Noussa	Noosa نوسة	Sherief	Youssef Marzouk	Television short film
1971	Witch	Sahera ساحرة	Ezz El-Dine	Henry Barakat	Television short film
1971	Midnight Pillars	Aamedet Montasaf El Leil أعمدة منتصف الليل	Steven	Wageeh El-Shennawy	Television short film
1973	Nefertiti and Akhenaton	Nefertiti y Aquenatos	Horemheb	Raúl Araiza	Mexican film

== Theater ==
Year	English title	Original title	Note(s)
1964	A Bullet in the Heart	Rosasah Fel A’lb رصاصة في القلب	Stage debut
1967	Rubabikia	Rubabikia روبابيكيا	
1972	A Bachelor and Three Maidens	A’zeb W Talaat Awanes عاذب وثلاث عوانس	
1973	A Man for Every Home	Ragol lekol Baet رجل لكل بيت	
1973	This Beautiful girl is from the Elephant Alley	El-Helwa Di Min Haret El-Fil الحلوة دي من حارة الفيل	
1973	The Honeymoon Game	Le'bat Shar El-Asal لعبة شهر عسل	
1973	My Thief Friend	Sadeeqy El-Less صديقي اللص	
1974	The Three Cards Hotel	Fondo’ El Talat Wara’at فندق الثلاث ورقات	
1974	One Million Pounds Marriage	Gawaza be million Geneh جوازة بمليون جنيه	
1978	A Married’s Man Trap	Masyadat Ragol Tazawag مصيدة رجل تزوج	
1979	Case No. 1	El Qadeya raqam Wahed القضية رقم واحد	
1979	One wife is Enough	Zawga waheda Takfy زوجة واحدة تكفي	
1980	Marriage Manners	Adab El-Gawaz أدب الجواز	
1981	Sincere Advise for Ladies	Nasiha Mokhlesa lil Sayedat نصيحة مخلصة للسيدات	
1981	Shared Apartment	Sha’a Moshtaraka شقة مشتركة	
1982	Respectable for a Month	Mohtaram lemodet Shahr محترم لمدة شهر	
1983	The World’s Savior	Monqez El A’lam منقذ العالم	
1984	Hanan My Wife	Mirati Hanan مراتي حنان	
1984	A Very Special Invitation	Da’wa Shakhseya Gedan دعوة شخصية جدًا	
1984	Wanted, part-time	Matloob liadam Al-Tafarough مطلوب لعدم التفرغ	
1985	Possible? No not possible	Ma’aool? La Ma’aool معقول؟ لا معقول	
1986	Watch out, Couples!	Entabeho Ayoha Al-Azwag إنتبهوا أيها الازواج	
1988	The Lost Day	El Yom El Mafqood اليوم المفقود	
1990	The Earthquake	El Zelzal الزلزال	

== Television ==
=== Selected works ===
Year	Title	Original title	Role(s)	Note(s)
1969	The Man with Five Faces	Al-Rajul Zu Al-Khamsat Wojooh الرجل ذو الخمسة وجوه	Ibrahim / Kamal / Mahmoud / Mounir / Sami	Main role
1969	Anonymous Number	Al-Raqam Al-Maghoool الرقم المجهول	Rushdy	Main role
1976	Khan El-Khalili	Khan El Khalili خان الخليلي	Ahmed Effendi Akef	Main role
1977	The Return of the Spirit	Awdet El Roh عودة الروح	Selim	Main role
1977	The Truth..That Unknown	Al-Haqeeqa..Thalek Al-Maghool الحقيقة .. ذلك المجهول	Madeeh	Main role
1977	Colors of Love	Alwan Min Al-Hub ألوان من الحب	Ezzat	Main role
1978	Mouths and Rabbits	Afwah Wa Araneb أفواه وأرانب	Mahmoud Bey	Main role
1979	Detective Inspector	Mofattesh El Mabaheth مفتش المباحث	Police Commissioner; Mohie	Main role
1980	Cat's Head	Ras El Ott راس القط	Psychiatrist	Main role
1980	Illusions and Truth	Al Wahm Wal Haqeeqa الوهم والحقيقة	Gaafar Abdel Geleel	Main role
1982	Torment Journey	Rihlet Azaab رحلة عذاب	Ahmed	Main role
1982	Dalia the Egyptian	Dalia El Masreya داليا المصرية	Mohe, Director of the EGID	Main role
1983	Flowers and Cactus	Zohoor w Ashwak زهور وأشواك	Judge Kamal	Main role
1983	A Woman's Revenge	Intiqam Imra'a إنتقام امرأة	Dr. Khairy	Main role
1984	Before Getting Lost	Qabl Al-Dayaa قبل الضياع	Kamal	Main role
1984	The Mirror	El Miraya المراية	Sheikh	Main role
1986	Al-Ansar	Al-Ansaar الأنصار	King	Main role
1987	Escape to Prison	El Horoob Ela El Segn الهروب إلي السجن	Judge Abdel Hamid	Main role
1987	Diplomatic Love	Al Hubb fe Haqeeba Diplomacia الحب في حقيبة دبلوماسية	Kamal	Main role
1989	The Years' Reckoning	Hesab El Seneen حساب السنين	Sadek	Main role
1989	Black and White	Abyad W Eswed أبيض وأسود	Mahmoud	Main role
1989	Woman in Whirlpool	Imra' fe Dawama امرأة في دوامة	El-Omda Hareedy	Main role
1990	The Family of Mr Shalash	A'elat El Ostath Chalache عائلة الأستاذ شلش	Farouk Shalash	Main role
1993	Muhammad is the Messenger of God to the world	Muhammad Rasool Allah Ila Al-Alam محمد رسول الله إلي العالم	Al-Muqawqis	Main role
1993	The Fox	El-Thaalab الثعلب	Ahmad Ismail Ali	Guest appearance; 5 episodes
1993	Angry Men and Women	Ghadeboon W Ghadebat غاضبون وغاضبات	Samir	Main role
1993	The Final Return	Al-Awda Al-Akheera العودة الأخيرة	Mamdouh	Main role

== As producer ==
Year	English title	Original title	Role	Production Studio	Distribution
1959	Among the Ruins	Bain Al Atlal بين الأطلال	Producer	Ezz El-Dine Zulficar Films	Al Sharq for Film Distribution
1959	The Second Man	El Ragol El Thani الرجل الثاني	Producer	Ezz El-Dine Zulficar Films	Al Sharq for Film Distribution
1960	Angel and Devil	Malak wa Shaitan ملاك وشيطان	Executive producer	Ezz El-Dine Zulficar Films	Al Sharq for Film Distribution
1960	The Holy Bond	Al Rabat Al Moqqadas الرباط المقدس	Executive producer	Ezz El-Dine Zulficar Films	Al Sharq for Film Distribution
1962	Struggle of the Heroes	Sera' Al-Abtal صراع الأبطال	Producer	Ezz El-Dine Zulficar Films	El Mottaheda for Cinema (Sobhi Farahat)
1962	A Date at the Tower	Maww'ed Fil-Borg موعد في البرج	Producer	Salah Zulfikar Films	Salah Zulfikar Films
1962	I am the Fugitive	Ana El Hareb أنا الهارب	Producer	Salah Zulfikar Films	El Mottaheda for Cinema (Sobhi Farahat)
1962	Letter from an Unknown Woman	Ressalah men Imraa Maghoula رسالة من امرأة مجهولة	Producer	Salah Zulfikar Films	Ramses Naguib and El Mottaheda for Cinema (Sobhi Farahat)
1966	My Wife, the Director General	Mirati Modeer Aam مراتي مدير عام	Producer	Salah Zulfikar Films	General Corporation for Films Distribution
1966	Three Thieves	3 Losoos ٣ لصوص	Producer	Salah Zulfikar Films	Filmentaj
1969	A Taste of Fear	Shey min El Khouf شئ من الخوف	Producer	Salah Zulfikar Films	General Egyptian Corporation for Cinema
1972	A Journey of Suffering	Rihlat Azab رحلة عذاب	Producer	Salah Zulfikar Films	Mohammed Serdar Films & Co.
1973	Death Song (TV short film)	Oghneyat El Moot أغنية الموت	Executive producer	Egyptian Television	Egyptian Television
1973	The Other Man	Al Rajul Al Akhar الرجل الآخر	Executive producer	General Egyptian Corporation for Cinema	General Egyptian Corporation for Cinema
1975	I Want a Solution	Orid Hallan أريد حلًا	Producer	Salah Zulfikar Films	Ihab El Leithy Films

== See also ==
- Egyptian cinema
- Lists of Egyptian films
