= List of Egyptian films of 1964 =

A list of films produced in Egypt in 1964. For an A-Z list of films currently on Wikipedia, see Category:Egyptian films.

| Title | Director | Cast | Genre | Notes |
|---|---|---|---|---|
| A Husband on Vacation (Zogue fe Agaza) | Mohamed Abdel Gawad | Salah Zulfikar, Laila Taher | Romantic Comedy | |
| Between Two Mansions (Bein El Quasrein) | Hassan El Imam | Yehia Chahine, Salah Qabil, Abdel Moneim Ibrahim | Drama | First part of Naguib Mahfouz Cairo trilogy |
| Last Night (Al-Laylah al-Akheera) | Kamal El Sheikh | Faten Hamama, Ahmed Mazhar | Mystery | Entered into the 1964 Cannes Film Festival |
| Love and Hate (Al Lahab) | Abdel Rahman Sherif | Shoukry Sarhan, Samira Ahmed, Emad Hamdy | Crime, Drama | |
| The Great Adventure (Al Moghamara Al Kobra) | Mahmoud Farid | Farid Shawqi, Hassan Youssef, Nagwa Fouad | Crime, Thriller | |
| Antar's Daughter (Bent Antar) | Niazi Mostafa | Samira Tawfiq, Ahmed Mazhar, Farid Shawqi | Drama, Historical | |
| Girls' Revolution (Thawret El Banat) | Kamal Attia | Nadia Lutfi, Hassan Youssef, Youssef Fakher Eddine | Romance, Drama | |
| District Girl (Bent El Hetta) | Hasan El-Saifi | Shoukry Sarhan, Samia Gamal, Ahmed Ramzy | Comedy, Family | |
| Youth, Love and Fun (Shabbab wa Hob wa Marah) | Nagdy Hafez | Nadia Lutfi, Emad Hamdy, Fouad El Mohandes | Drama | |
| Fugitive from Marriage (Hareb mn El Zawag) | Hasan El-Saifi | Fouad El Mohandes, Shwikar, Mahmoud el-Meliguy | Comedy | |
| Me, Him and Her (Ana wa Hwa wa Hya) | Fatin Abdel Wahab | Fouad El Mohandes, Shwikar, Tawfiq El Deken | Comedy, Drama | |
| Runaway from life (Hareb men El Hayat) | Atef Salim | Nadia Lutfi, Salah Zulfikar, Shoukry Sarhan | Drama | |
| A Husband's Confessions (I’trafat Zawg) | Fatin Abdel Wahab | Fouad El Mohandes, Shwikar, Hind Rostom | Comedy | |
| Prince of Cunningness (Ameer El Dahaa’) | Henry Barakat | Farid Shawqi, Shwikar, Naeema Akef | Crime, Drama, Thriller | |
| Adham El Charkawi | Hossam Eddine Mostafa | Abdallah Geith, Lobna Abdel Aziz, Shwikar | Historical, Biography | |
| The Road (Al Tareeq) | Hossam Eddine Mostafa | Shadia, Soad Hosny, Rushdy Abaza, Taheyya Kariokka | Crime, Drama | |
| The Honored Family (Al ‘Aela Al Karima) | Fatin Abdel Wahab | Hoda Sultan, Farid Shawqi, Mary Mounib | | |
| The Three Bachelors (Al ‘Ozzab Al Thalatha ) | Mahmoud Farid | Soad Hosny, Hassan Youssef, Adel Mamoun | | |
| Game of Love and Marriage (L’bet Al Hob wa Al Gawaz) | Niazi Mostafa | Soad Hosny, Farid Shawki, Samir Sabry | | |
| The Three Devils (Al Shayateen Al Thalatha) | Hossam Eddine Mostafa | Rushdy Abaza, Ahmed Ramzy, Hassan Youssef | Action, Thriller | |
| The Love Seeker (Al Bahetha ‘an El Hob) | Ahmed Diaa Eddine | Nadia Lutfi, Rushdy Abaza, Mohamed Sultan | Drama, Romance | |
| For Men Only (Lel Regal Faqat) | Mahmoud Zulfikar | Nadia Lutfi, Soad Hosny, Hassan Youssef | Comedy, Romance | |
| One Thousand and One Nights (Alf Leila wa Leila) | Hassan El Imam | Shadia, Farid Shawqi, Layla Fawzy | Adventure, Fantasy, Drama | |
