= List of Egyptian films of 1963 =

A list of films produced in Egypt in 1963. For an A-Z list of films currently on Wikipedia, see Category:Egyptian films.

Title	Director	Cast	Genre	Notes
Salladin the Victorious (Al Nasser Salah Al Din)	Youssef Chahine	Ahmed Mazhar, Salah Zulfikar, Nadia Lutfi, Layla Fawzi	Historical	Entered into the 3rd Moscow International Film Festival
Mother of the Bride (Omm el Aroussa)	Atef Salem	Taheyya Kariokka, Imad Hamdi	Comedy	
Soft Hands (El Aydee El Naema)	Mahmoud Zulfikkar	Sabah, Salah Zulfikar, Ahmed Mazhar, Mariam Fakhr Eddine	Comedy	Entered into the 14th Berlin International Film Festival
His Majesty (Saheb Al Galala)	Fatin Abdel Wahab	Farid Shawki, Fouad El Mohandes, Samira Ahmad	Comedy	
Rabaa El Adawiya	Niazi Mustafa	Nabila Ebeid, Farid Shawki, Emad Hamdy	Biography, Drama	
The Newspaper Seller (Bya’t El Garayed)	Hassan El Imam	Magda, Naeema Akef, Laila Fawzy	Drama	
The Little Witch (Al Sahera Al Saghira)	Niazi Mustafa	Rushdy Abaza, Soad Hosny, Madiha Yousry, Fouad El Mohandes	Romance, Comedy	
Bride of the Nile (‘Aroos El Nil)	Fatin Abdel Wahab	Lobna Abdel Aziz, Rushdy Abaza, Shwikar	Fantasy, Romance	
A Groom for my Sister (‘Arees Lokhty)	Ahmed Diaa El Din	Mariam Fakhr Eddine, Kamal El Shennawy, Zizi El Badrawy		
The Funny Crime (Al Gareema Al Dahka)	Nagdy Hafez	Ahmed Mazhar, Soad Hosny, Mahmoud El-Meliguy	Comedy, Crime	
Years Of Love (Sanawat Al Hob)	Mahmoud Zulfikar	Nadia Lutfi, Shoukry Sarhan, Laila Taher	Drama, Romance	
The Trap (Al Masyada)	Tolba Radwan	Farid Shawki, Ayda Hilal, Mahmoud El-Meliguy		
A Bachelor's Life (Hayat ‘Azeb)	Nagdy Hafez	Nadia Lutfi, Shoukry Sarhan, Abdel Moneim Ibrahim	Drama	
The Groom Arrives Tomorrow (Al ‘Arees Yasl Ghadan)	Niazi Mustafa	Soad Hosny, Ahmed Ramzy, Fouad El Mohandes	Comedy, Romance	
Without Hope (Men Gheir Amal)	Hassan Reda	Madiha Yousry, Kamal El-Shennawi, Shwikar	Drama	
Secret of the Runaway (Ser Al Hariba)	Hossam Eddine Mustafa	Soad Hosny, Shoukry Sarhan, Kamal El-Shennawi	Thriller, Crime	
The Last Night (Al Leila Al Akhira)	Kamal El Sheikh	Faten Hamama, Ahmed Mazhar, Mahmoud Morsi	Drama	
The Price of Love (Thaman Al Hob)	Mahmoud Zulfikar	Maryam Fakhr Eddine, Shoukry Sarhan, Fouad El Mohandes	Comedy	
Madmen in Paradise (Al Maganeen Fi Naeem)	Hassan El Seifi	Ismail Yassine, Rushdy Abaza, Shwikar	Comedy	
Love I Can't Forget (Hob La Ansah)	Saad Arafa	Nadia Lutfi, Emad Hamdi	Romance	
Madaq Alley (Zoqaq El Madaq)	Hassan El Imam	Shadia, Hassan Youssef, Salah Kabil	Drama	
On the Banks of the Nile (Ala Difaf El Nil)	Kô Nakahira	Ishihara Yujiro, Shadia, Kamal El-Shennawi	Action, Thriller	
Princess of the Arabs (Ameerat Al Arab)	Niazi Mustafa	Warda, Rushdy Abaza, Fouad El Mohandes	Drama, Fantasy, Romance	
The Black Glasses (Al Nazara Al Souda)	Hossam Eddine Mustafa	Nadia Lutfi, Ahmed Mazhar, Ahmed Ramzy	Drama	
Zizi's Family (A’let Zizi)	Fatin Abdel Wahab	Soad Hosny, Fouad El Mohandes, Ahmed Ramzy	Comedy, Romance	
The Open Door (Al Bab Al Maftooh)	Henry Barakat	Faten Hamama, Saleh Selim, Mahmoud Morsy	Drama, Romance	
No Time for Love (La Waqt Lel Hob)	Salah Abu Seif	Faten Hamama, Rushdy Abaza, Salah Jaheen	Drama, Romance	
