= List of Egyptian films of 1982 =

A list of films produced in Egypt in 1982. For an A-Z list of films currently on Wikipedia, see Category:Egyptian films.

Title	Director	Cast	Genre	Notes
Al-Awwama 70 (Houseboat No. 70)	Khairy Beshara	Ahmad Zaki, Tayseer Fahmy, Kamal el-Shennawi	Drama	
El Tawoos (The Peacock)	Kamal El Sheikh	Salah Zulfikar, Nour El-Sherif, Raghda	Crime thriller	
Ala Bab El Wazir (At The Minister's Door)	Mohamed Abdel Aziz	Adel Emam, Yousra	Comedy / drama	
Esabat Hamada Wa Toto (Hamada and Toto Gang)	Mohamed Abdel Aziz	Adel Emam, Lebleba	comedy / crime	
Haddouta Masriya (An Egyptian Story)	Youssef Chahine	Nour El-Sherif, Mohamed Mounir	Drama	
Laylat Shetaa Dafe'a (A Warm Winter Night)	Ahmed Fouad	Adel Emam, Yousra, Mahmoud el-Meliguy	Romantic comedy	
