= Soft Hands (film) =

1963 film

- الأيدي الناعمة
- Directed by: Mahmoud Zulfikar
- Written by: Tawfiq al-Hakim
- Screenplay by: Youssef Gohar
- Based on: Soft Hands (book)
- Starring: Sabah; Salah Zulfikar; Ahmed Mazhar; Mariam Fakhr Eddine
- Cinematography: Aly Kheiralla; Wadid Sirry
- Edited by: Fekry Rostom
- Music by: Ali Ismael
- Production company: The General Company for Arab Film Production
- Distributed by: Al Sharq Films Distribution
- Release date: 1963
- Running time: 75 minutes
- Country: Egypt
- Language: Egyptian Arabic

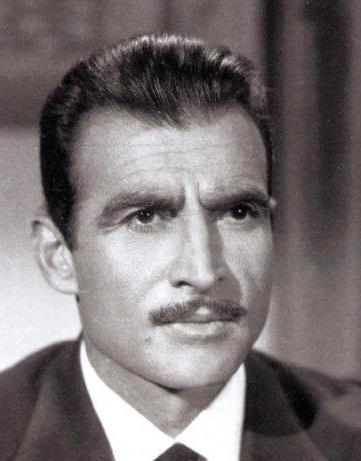
Ahmed Mazhar (actor)

Soft Hands (Arabic: الأيدي الناعمة, translit.al-aydi al-nā'ima) is a 1963 Egyptian comedy film directed by Mahmoud Zulfikar. It is based on a play of the same name by Egyptian playwright Tawfiq al-Hakim (1953). It features an ensemble cast that includes Sabah, Salah Zulfikar, Ahmed Mazhar, Mariam Fakhr Eddine and Laila Taher. The film was entered into the 14th Berlin International Film Festival. The film a member of the Top 100 Egyptian films list.

The plot involves a formerly landed aristocrat dispossessed by the 1952 Egyptian Revolution. The plot follows the aristocrat's struggle coming to terms with the reality of needing to work for a living, after being stripped of all landownership. He meets a similarly jobless doctorate in the Arabic language, who, like him, is not willing to accept a job below his stature. Both must adjust to the new social and political realities in a new Nasserite socialist Egypt.

== Synopsis ==
A former prince becomes jobless after the Egyptian Revolution of 1952, and goes bankrupt with only his palace remaining. He meets a young man, doctor Hammouda, who has a doctorate but is unemployed. The doctor suggests to the prince that he take advantage of the palace by renting it furnished. The prince has two daughters whom he disowned because the eldest daughter married a simple engineer against the father's will, and the youngest daughter sells her paintings. The doctor agrees with them that the son-in-law, whom the prince has not seen before, along with his widowed sister and her father, rent the palace. His estrangement with his two daughters ends, and he works as a tourist guide and marries the widow, while the doctor marries the youngest daughter.

== Crew ==
- Directed by: Mahmoud Zulfikar
- Story: Tawfiq Al-Hakim
- Screenplay and dialogue: Youssef Gohar
- Cinematography: Wadid Serry
- Editing: Fekry Rostom
- Music: Ali Ismael
- Production studio: The General Company for Arab Film Production
- Distribution: Al Sharq Films Distribution

== Cast ==
- Sabah as Karima Abdel Salam
- Salah Zulfikar as Doctor Hammouda
- Ahmed Mazhar as Prince Shawkat Helmy
- Mariam Fakhr Eddine as Princess Jehan Shawkat Helmy
- Laila Taher as Princess Mervat Shawkat Helmy
- Ahmed Khamis as Salem Abdel Salam
- Widad Hamdi as Zaza the wife of a livestock dealer
- Kamel Anwar as Lulu the livestock dealer
- Hussein Aser as Hag Abdel Salam
- Ahmed Luxer as Nabil Imad
- Abdul-Ghani Al-Najdi as Head of chefs
- Hussein Ismail as Zaghloul the Sofragi
- Muhammad Idris as Osman the Sofargi
- Anwar Madkour as Director of the Cinema Company
- Abdul Mohsen Selim as the executive of the cinema company
- Edmond Twima as owner of the record company
- Abbas Al-Dali as basbousa seller
- Mutawa Owais as vegetable seller
- Tusson Moatamed as Chicken Seller
- Saleh Al-Iskandarani as the seller of grilled corn
- Abdul Hamid Badawi as one of the owing
- Muhammed Morgan
- Rashad Ibrahim

== See also ==
- Salah Zulfikar filmography
- List of Egyptian films of 1963
- List of Egyptian films of the 1960s
