= A Husband on Vacation =

1964 film

- Arabic: زوج في إجازة
- English: A Husband on Holiday
- Arabic: Zogue fi ijaza
- Directed by: Mohamed Abdel Gawad
- Written by: Rashad Hegazi
- Produced by: Khalil Shawqi
- Starring: Salah Zulfikar; Laila Taher
- Cinematography: Adel Abdel Azim
- Edited by: Albert Naguib
- Music by: Youssef Shawqi
- Production company: General Company for Arab Film Production
- Distributed by: General Company for Arab Film Production
- Release date: 1 January 1964
- Running time: 88 minutes
- Country: Egypt
- Language: Egyptian Arabic

A Husband on Vacation also known as A Husband on Holiday (Arabic: زوج في إجازة, translit.Zawg fe Agaza or Zogue fi ijaza or Zogue fe Agaza) is a 1964 Egyptian romantic comedy film starring Salah Zulfikar and Laila Taher. The film is written by Rashad Hegazi and directed by Mohamed Abdel Gawad.

== Plot ==
Essam Nour El-Din is married to Gamalat and decides to escape from the boredom of his married life, so he claims to his wife that he is assigned to work for several months in the city of Aswan. Essam travels to Alexandria, to spend a vacation trip, when his wife discovers his trick, and decides to teach him a lesson, disguising herself as a playful blonde girl named Rosita. Rosita or Gamalat tempts Essam, who falls in love with her, and events follow.

== Crew ==
- Screenplay: Rashad Hegazi
- Directed by: Mohamed Abdel Gawad
- Production Studio: General Company for Arab Film Production
- Distribution: General Company for Arab Film Production
- Cinematography: Adel Abdel Azim
- Music: Youssef Shawqi

== Cast ==
- Salah Zulfikar as Essam Nour El-Din
- Laila Taher as Gamalat
- Nadia El-Noqrashi as Fatima
- Abu Bakr Ezzat as Hussein
- Omar Afifi as Ahmed, Rawya's husband
- Hala El Shawarby as a Rawya
- Abdel-Khaleq Saleh as Bahgat Abdel Salam
- Fifi Saeed as Sania, Gamalat's mother
- Hussein Ismail as Sayed the janitor
- Edmond Toema as the waiter
- Gamil Ezz El-Din as Yousry

== See also ==
- Egyptian cinema
- Salah Zulfikar filmography
- List of Egyptian films of 1964
- List of Egyptian films of the 1960s
