= Ana wa Banati =

- Arabic: أنا و بناتي
- Directed by: Hussein Helmy El-Mohandess
- Written by: Hussein Helmy El-Mohandess
- Produced by: Victor Antoine
- Starring: Salah Zulfikar; Nahed Sherif; Zaki Rostom
- Cinematography: Victor Antoine
- Edited by: Albert Naguib
- Music by: Ibrahim Haggag
- Production company: Mina Films (Victor Antoine)
- Distributed by: Bahna Film
- Release date: April 30, 1961
- Running time: 130 minutes
- Country: Egypt
- Language: Egyptian Arabic

Ana wa Banati (Arabic: أنا و بناتي, English: My Daughters and I or Me and My Daughters) is a 1961 Egyptian film starring Salah Zulfikar, Nahed Sherif and Zaki Rostom. The film is written and directed by Hussein Helmy El-Mohandess, and features an ensemble cast that includes Amaal Farid, Fayza Ahmed and Zahret El-Ola.

== Plot ==
Samir is a playboy, he meets Maysa and likes her and she likes him back, but she didn't tell her father about her relationship. Her father is a struggling man but he can raise his four daughters well, but cannot provide enough money necessary to prepare them for marriage, and when he is referred to the pension, one of the swindlers takes his reward. The father enters the hospital as a result of an accident, and his daughters work to face life. One of them works as a singer in a hall, the second works as a model, the third writes stories and admires a great writer and takes him like her, and the fourth Maysa remains at home. The father knows their condition and decides to hide from sight. When Maysa loves Samir and falls into an affair with him, she decides to commit suicide and dies. Tragedy pushes the father back to reunite the family.

== Crew ==
- Writer: Hussein Helmy El-Mohandes
- Director: Hussein Helmy El-Mohandes
- Produced by: Mina Films (Victor Antoine)
- Distribution: Bahna Film
- Soundtrack: Ibrahim Haggag
- Cinematographer: Victor Antoine
- Editor: Albert Naguib

== Cast ==
- Salah Zulfikar as Samir
- Nahed Sherif as Maysa Mahmoud Abdel-Fattah
- Zaki Rostom as Mahmoud Abdel-Fattah
- Amaal Farid as Mona Mahmoud Abdel-Fattah
- Zahret El-Ola as Mervat Mahmoud Abdel-Fattah
- Fayza Ahmed as Mahassin Mahmoud Abdel-Fattah
- Abdel Moneim Ibrahim as Fahmy
- Abdul-Ghani El-Nagdi as Hamza
- Ahmad Farhat as Zanbah
- Edmond Twima as Ibrahim
- Abdulghani Qamar as Bayoumi
- Abdul Hamid Badawi as Bashndi
- Saleh Mohamed Saleh as Maestro
- Samira Mohamed as Fashion model
- Samiya Rushdi as Hamza's mother
- Abbas El-Dali as Afifi
- Fathiya Shaheen as Owner of the Fashion Store
- Saleh El-Iskandarani as Gardener
- Farid Abdullah as Poker player
- Ali Kamel as Gaber
- Ahmed Bali as Employee of a friend of Mahmoud
- Ahmed Morsi as Shawish
- Terry Kamel
- Zainab Nassar

== See also ==
- Egyptian cinema
- Salah Zulfikar filmography
- List of Egyptian films of 1961
- List of Egyptian films of the 1960s
