= For Men Only (1964 film) =

- Directed by: Mahmoud Zulfikar
- Screenplay by: Mohamed Abu Youssef; Mahmoud Zulfikar
- Produced by: Gamal El Leithy
- Starring: Nadia Lutfi; Soad Hosny; Hassan Youssef
- Cinematography: Wadid Serry
- Edited by: Hussein Ahmed
- Music by: Michel Youssef
- Release date: 16 November 1964 (Egypt)
- Running time: 100 minutes
- Country: Egypt
- Language: Arabic

For Men Only (Arabic: للرجال فقط, translit. Lel Regal Fakat) is a 1964 Egyptian romantic comedy film written and directed by Mahmoud Zulfikar.

== Cast ==
- Nadia Lutfi as Elham/Mustafa
- Soad Hosny as Salwa/Hassan
- Hassan Youssef as Fawzi
- Ihab Nafea as Ahmed
- Amal Ramzy as Fekria
- Youssef Shaaban as Amin
- Souheir Magdy

== See also ==
- Cinema of Egypt
- Lists of Egyptian films
- List of Egyptian films of 1964
- List of Egyptian films of the 1960s
