= A Moment of Weakness =

- Arabic: لحظة ضعف
- Directed by: Sayed Tantawy
- Screenplay by: Mahmoud Abu Zeid
- Produced by: Fouad El-Alfy
- Starring: Salah Zulfikar; Nelly; Hussein Fahmy
- Cinematography: Moustafa Emam
- Music by: Hussein El Imam; Moody El Imam
- Production company: Fouad El-Alfy films
- Distributed by: Ihab El-Leithy films
- Release date: January 1, 1981 (Egypt)
- Running time: 110 minutes
- Country: Egypt
- Language: Egyptian Arabic

A Moment of Weakness (Arabic: لحظة ضعف, translit. Lahzet Da'af) is a 1981 Egyptian drama film written by Mahmoud Abu Zeid and directed by Sayed Tantawy. It stars Salah Zulfikar, Nelly and Hussein Fahmy.

== Plot ==
Abdul Ghaffar outrages against his wife, Saneya, when he discovers that Sahar is not his daughter, but rather as a result of a sinful relationship with Saneya before her marriage to him. To Egypt, it turns out that Abdul Ghaffar has assigned Sharif the task of returning Sahar after he regrets and is convinced that she is a victim, Sharif asks Abdul Ghaffar to keep his mission secret from Sahar and bless their marriage.

== Crew ==
- Director: Sayed Tantawy
- Screenplay: Mahmoud Abu Zeid
- Studio: Fouad El-Alfy Films
- Distributor: Ihab El-Leithy Films
- Soundtrack: Hussein El Imam, Moody El Imam
- Cinematographer: Moustafa Emam

== Cast ==
- Salah Zulfikar as Abdul Ghaffar Lutfi
- Nelly as Saneya/Sahar
- Hussein Fahmy as Sharif Farid
- Soher El Bably as Lola
- Salama Elias as Khalil Hamdi the lawyer
- Kadriye Kamel as the mother of Shafaat
- Lamia Yousry as Sahar
- Taghreed Abdel Hamid as Shafa'at
- Abdul-Moneim Al-Nimr as Sayed

== See also ==
- Egyptian cinema
- Salah Zulfikar filmography
- List of Egyptian films of 1981
- List of Egyptian films of the 1980s
