= The Family of Mr Shalash =

1990 Egyptian TV miniseries

- Arabic: عائلة الأستاذ شلش
- Genre: Drama • Comedy
- Written by: Mohamed Nabih
- Screenplay by: Ahmed Awad
- Directed by: Mohamed Nabih
- Starring: Salah Zulfikar
- Theme music composer: Hany Shnooda
- Country of origin: Egypt
- Original language: Egyptian Arabic
- No. of episodes: 15

Production
- Cinematography: Samir El Sabban, Moustafa Eid
- Running time: 45 minutes per episode
- Production company: Egyptian Television

Original release
- Network: Egyptian Television Network
- Release: March 27 – April 10, 1990

The Family of Mr Shalash (Arabic: عائلة الأستاذ شلش, translit: A’elat El Ostath Shalash or Eayilat al'ustadh shalash, aliases: Mr. Shalash’s Family, French: La famille Chalache) is an Egyptian comedy drama miniseries directed by Mohamed Nabih. Salah Zulfikar stars as Mr. Farouk Shalash. The series is based on a story written by Mohamed Nabih and Ahmed Awad. It was aired for the first time during Ramadan on 27 March 1990 on Egyptian television.

== Plot ==
The events revolve around the daily life of Mr. Farouk Shalash (Salah Zulfikar), through a large number of comic situations and paradoxes that arise through his relationship with his wife and children, or his relationships with neighbors or with his co-workers showing social problems that face the community through the small family of Mr. Shalash.

== Cast and characters ==
- Salah Zulfikar: Farouk Shalash
- Laila Taher: Nagia
- Mahmoud el-Gendy: Mahmoud
- Ahmed Salama: Hisham Shalash
- Nahed Gabr: The soapy strength of hearts
- Gamal Ismail: Usta Azqalani
- Salwa Othman: I wrote Habiba Nabil
- Zuzu Nabil: Fitna Hanim
- Eglal Zaki: Laila Shalash
- Tahiyyat Al-Ansari: Sahar Shalash
- Magda Zaki: Nadia Shalash
- Imad Rashad: Nabil Shalash
- Alaa Awad: Hani: classmate of Sahar
- Nabil Noureddine: Dr. Medhat
- Nashwa Mustafa: Enas, Hisham's colleague
- Ashraf Farouk
- Mahmoud Alwan
- Lashina Lashin
- Hani Kamal: Dr. Ahmed
- Sherif Idris: Ramy son of Nadia Shalash
- Adel Sharif: a child
- Iman Yousry: a child
- Muhammed Hussain: Child
- Reem: a child
- Nesma Hamed: a child
- Sherif Sabry: Alaa is Nadia's husband
- Nadia Ezzat: Shalash's neighbor, Sukkar
- Sahar Talaat
- Olfat Sokkar: Shalash's neighbor's, Dawlat
- Enayat Saleh: wife of Usta Fathi
- Nahir Amin: Hemmat is Shalash's neighbor
- Qassem Al-Dali: Osta Fathi
- Fifi Youssef: The mother of the strength of hearts
- Rania Fathallah
- Nawal Hashem: husband of Usta Azqalani
- Hussein Sherif: Helmy is a Shalash driver
- Saeed Obaid
- Farouk Ramadan
- Suleiman Hussein
- Moheb Kasser
- Tawfiq Al-Kurdi
- Tariq Mandour: Dr. Ayman Othman
- Hassan Mustafa
- Salah Sadiq
- Sayed Abdel Fattah
- Musa Salem
- Mahmoud Gleefon
- Ezzat Badran
- Adel El-Shennawi
- Magdy Said: Nabil's colleague
- Sayed Mustafa
- Abdul Rahman Hamid
- Mr hussain
- Mohammed Jalal
- Fayza Abu Hatab
- Mahmoud El Hefnawy: Hisham's colleague at the college

== See also ==
- Arab television drama
- List of Egyptian television series
- Salah Zulfikar filmography
