= A Scrap of Bread =

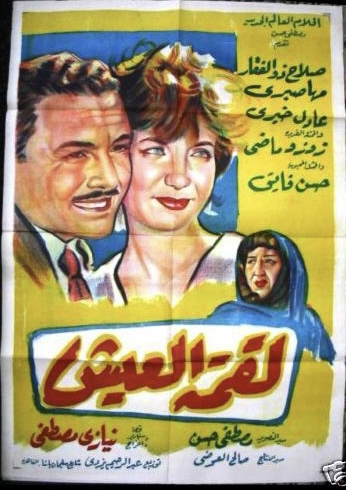
- Theatrical release poster
- Directed by: Niazi Mostafa
- Screenplay by: Niazi Mustafa; Abdel Fattah El Sayed; Mustafa Fouad
- Produced by: Mustafa Hassan
- Starring: Salah Zulfikar
- Cinematography: Mostafa Hassan
- Edited by: Galal Mostafa
- Production company: New World Films (Mustafa Hassan)
- Distributed by: Abdel Reheem Yazdi
- Release date: November 4, 1960 (Egypt)
- Running time: 110 minutes
- Country: Egypt
- Language: Egyptian Arabic

A Scrap of Bread or Daily Bread (Egyptian Arabic: لقمة العيش, romanized: Luʾmat el-ʿĒsh) is a 1960 Egyptian film starring Salah Zulfikar and directed by Niazi Mustafa.

== Plot ==
Two friends, Mohsen and Fathi, live together in a hotel; both do not work. Mohsen and Samia fall in love with each other. Mohsen finally finds a job opportunity at Samia's father's farm, but the only condition for this job is that the employee must be married. Mohsen is forced to lie in order to get the job, so Fathi wears women clothes and goes with Mohsen to the farm as Mohsen's wife, and events escalate.

== Staff ==
- Directed by: Niazi Mostafa
- Story and script: Niazi Mostafa, Abdel Fattah El-Sayed, Mostafa Fouad
- Cinematographer: Mostafa Hassan
- Editing: Galal Mustafa
- Production: New World Films (Mustafa Hassan)
- Distributor: Abdul Rahim Yazdi
- Editor: Abdul Rahim Yazdi

== Cast ==
- Salah Zulfikar as Mohsen
- Maha Sabry as Samiya
- Adel Khairy as Fathi
- Zuzu Madi as Mounira
- Hassan Fayek Samia's father
- Saeed Abu Bakr as Bassiouni
- Abdul-Alim Khattab as Ghazal
- Badr Nofal as Owais
- Salwa Mahmoud as Mabrooka
- Kawthar Ramzy as Kawthar
- Abbas Rahmi as Doctor
- Huda Tawfik as Farm woman
- Ragaa Abdel Hamid as Farm woman
- Hussein Ismail as Waiter

== See also ==
- Salah Zulfikar filmography
- List of Egyptian films of 1960
