= Saladin the Victorious =

1963 film

Al Nasser Salah Ad-Din
- English cover
- Directed by: Youssef Chahine
- Written by: Ezz El-Dine Zulficar; Mohamed Abdel Gawad; Youssef Chahine (screenplay); Abd al-Rahman Sharqawi (screenplay); Yusuf Sibai (story); Naguib Mahfouz (novel)
- Produced by: Assia Dagher
- Starring: Ahmed Mazhar; Salah Zulfikar; Nadia Lutfi
- Cinematography: Wadeed Sirry
- Edited by: Rachida Abdel Salam
- Music by: Angelo Francesco Lavagnino
- Production companies: Lotus Films; General Egyptian Corporation for Cinema Production
- Distributed by: Lotus Film Distribution
- Release date: 1963
- Running time: 186 minutes
- Country: Egypt
- Language: Arabic

Saladin the Victorious (1963) (Egyptian Arabic: الناصر صلاح الدين, El-Nasser Salah Ed-Din), also known as Saladin and the Great Crusades, is a 1963 Egyptian epic film directed by Youssef Chahine. It is co-written by Chahine, Yusuf Sibai, Naguib Mahfouz, and others. The film features an ensemble cast. It stars Ahmed Mazhar, Salah Zulfikar, Nadia Lutfi, Omar El-Hariri, Mahmoud El-Meliguy, Leila Fawzi, Hamdi Gheiss, Ahmed Luxor, Hussein Riad, Laila Taher and Zaki Toleimat.

It was entered into the 3rd Moscow International Film Festival. The film was restored to its original running time of 186 minutes from the original negative by the Cineteca di Bologna and was shown at Il Cinema Ritrovato in June 2019. Saladin the Victorious is one of the Top 100 Egyptian films.

== Plot ==
The film begins with Jerusalem under the authority of the Christians of Europe and the evil Crusader commander Raynald of Châtillon ordering the slaughter of Muslim pilgrims in order to loot their caravans despite the protests of the Christian King of Jerusalem Guy of Lusignan. Saladin (Ahmed Mazhar) upon hearing this news seeks the reclamation of the holy lands in a short, almost impossible campaign. In the Battle of Hattin, Saladin succeeds in defeating and capturing both Raynald and Guy, and later kills Raynald in single combat. He then takes back Jerusalem, which leads the powers of Europe, thanks to the persuasion/propaganda of Raynald's treacherous widow Virginia (Leila Fawzi), to organize the Third Crusade with the combined forces of the French king (Omar El-Hariri) and the English under the leadership of Richard the Lionheart of England (Hamdi Gheiss). Saladin succeeds in preventing the recapture of Jerusalem, and in the end negotiations between himself and Richard (whom Saladin admires as the only honorable infidel leader) leave the Holy Land in Muslim hands.

The film also has a subplot involving Saladin's Christian commander Issa El Awam (Salah Zulfikar), and the Crusader Hospitaller Louisa (Nadia Lutfi). At the beginning, both first meet at Hattin when Issa accidentally comes upon her when she's taking a nighttime bath in Lake Tiberias near a Crusader encampment; after he turns away waiting for her to get dressed before he takes her prisoner due to being a Crusader, she shoots an arrow at him and escapes. Eventually, after Issa in turn spares her life twice, Louisa chooses to give up her arms as a Crusader and becomes a nurse. This leads to the two falling in love and marrying each other, with Louisa choosing to remain in Jerusalem with him.

== Background ==
Salah ad-Din al-Ayyubi, widely known as Saladin, is regarded as one of the most iconic figures in Islamic history. He rose to prominence during the 12th century as the leader of the Muslim forces during the Crusades. Saladin’s unwavering determination, military prowess, and chivalry won the respect of his allies and foes alike. He famously recaptured Jerusalem from the Crusaders and promoted peaceful coexistence among diverse religious and cultural communities.

The movie depicts the events of the Third Crusade: after Saladin reclaimed Jerusalem, the European powers led by King Richard of England, Emperor Barbarossa of the Holy Roman Empire and King Phillip Augustus of France joined together to recapture it and return it into Christian hands. This resulted in the war between the Europeans and Saladin, which lasted for three years before a truce was made between Saladin and King Richard, allowing Saladin to keep the land while Christians could freely enter Jerusalem.

The film expounds the Pan-Arabist and anti-colonialist ideology of post-revolutionary Egypt. Saladin's depiction references and parallels Gamal Abdel Nasser, the military officer who took power shortly after the Egyptian Revolution of 1952. Saladin, portrayed by Ahmed Mazhar, Nasser's classmate at the Royal Military Academy, expounds Pan-Arab unity, saying, "My dream is to see an Arab Nation under one flag, hearts united and free of hate." The character Issa, an Arab Christian, similarly illustrates the film's Pan-Arabist sympathies when he chooses to fight alongside Saladin and his army against the European Christians. The film also depicts European oppression of their colonial Arab subjects; subjugated Arabs are made to pull siege towers at the head of the Crusader army, the Arabs representing those who remain oppressed by European imperialism, while the mechanical siege towers themselves represent the European technological superiority wielded against Egypt during the Suez Crisis. Saladin's Arabic alliance defeats the European crusader army, paralleling the end of Egypt's status as a British protectorate and Egypt's favorable outcome in the Suez Crisis.

== Production ==
The budget was enormous at this time in Egypt, reaching 120,000 L.E. The poster was created by Egyptian artist Mohamed Ragheb.

== Reception ==
The film is considered one of the most important Arabic movies of all time, although some viewers took issue with the film's historical inaccuracies. It is also infamous for a production mistake showing a military officer wearing a wristwatch.

== Historicity ==
Richard I was not shot by a poisoned arrow as depicted in the film but both Richard I and Philippe Augustus II of France were sick from arnaldia, a disease similar to scurvy.

Saladin did not kill Raynald of Châtillon in a duel, but did personally execute him.

Raynald of Châtillon's wife was not named Virginia and he was never married to a woman with that name; his wife at the time of his death was Stephanie of Milly.

Issa El Awwam was a Muslim not Christian.

== Cast ==
- Ahmed Mazhar as Saladin
- Salah Zulfikar as Issa El Awwam
- Nadia Lutfi as Louisa de Lusignan
- Hamdi Gheiss as King Richard I (Richard the Lion-Heart)
- Leila Fawzi as Virginia, Princess of Kerak
- Mahmoud El-Meliguy as Conrad, Marquis of Montferrat
- Tewfik El Deken as Prince of Acre
- Omar Al-Hariri as King Philip of France
- Hussein Riad as Hykari
- Zaki Tulaimat as Duke Arthur
- Laila Taher as Queen Berengaria
- Ahmed Louxor as Raynald of Châtillon
- Fattouh Nchati as Guy of Lusignan
- Ibrahim Emara
- Mohamed Hamdi
- Mohamed Abdel Gawad

== See also ==
- Saladin section of legacy in the films and Media.
- Egyptian cinema
- List of historical drama films
- List of Egyptian films of 1963
- Salah Zulfikar filmography
- Youssef Chahine filmography
- List of Islamic films
- Battle of Hattin
- Third Crusade
