= List of Egyptian films of 1965 =

A list of films produced in Egypt in 1965. For an A-Z list of films currently on Wikipedia, see Category:Egyptian films.

== 1965 ==
Title	Director	Cast	Genre	Notes
1965
The Sin	Henry Barakat	Faten Hamama, Zaki Rostom	Drama	Entered into the 1965 Cannes Film Festival
Dearer than My Life	Mahmoud Zulfikar	Salah Zulfikar, Shadia	Romantic Drama	
Driven from Paradise	Fatin Abdel Wahab	Farid Shawqi, Samira Ahmed	Fantasy, drama	Entered into the 4th Moscow International Film Festival
The Mamelukes	Atef Salem	Omar Sharif	Historical, drama	
The Impossible	Hussein Kamal	Nadia Lutfi	Drama	
