= Five-Star Thieves =

- Arabic: لصوص خمس نجوم
- Directed by: Ashraf Fahmy
- Screenplay by: Wagih Abu Zekry; Samir El Gamal
- Starring: Salah Zulfikar
- Cinematography: Abdellatif Fahmy
- Edited by: Enayat El Sayes
- Music by: Omar Khairat
- Production company: Egyptian Television Network
- Distributed by: Egyptian Television Network
- Release date: 10 January 1994 (Egypt)
- Running time: 100 minutes
- Country: Egypt
- Language: Egyptian Arabic

Five-Star Thieves (Arabic: لصوص خمس نجوم) is an Egyptian film released in 1994. It is directed by Ashraf Fahmy and stars Salah Zulfikar. This film is Salah Zulfikar's final film role and was released posthumously.

== Plot ==
Galal Suleiman (Salah Zulfikar) is the manager of an investment bank where Shukri Abu Al-Fadl (Abu Bakr Ezzat) works as a legal advisor. Shoukry plans with his friend Youssef Elwi (Mostafa Fahmy) to loot the bank's money. Youssef arrives in Egypt and meets the director of the bank, Galal, and appears as a strong and honorable investor. Youssef uses his charm and wealth to influence Lubna (Dalal Abdel Aziz), Galal's secretary, who is rebellious against her poor environment.

== Main cast ==
- Salah Zulfikar: Galal Suleiman
- Mustafa Fahmy: Youssef Elwi
- Dalal Abdel Aziz: Lubna
- Abu Bakr Ezzat as Shukri Abu Al-Fadl
- Ihab Nafea as Minister
- Abdullah Farghali as Lubna’s father
- Nahed Gabr as Sanaa
- Laila Fahmy as Lubna’s mother
- Enaam Elgretly as Mounira

== See also ==
- Salah Zulfikar filmography
- List of Egyptian films of 1994
