= Paris and Love =

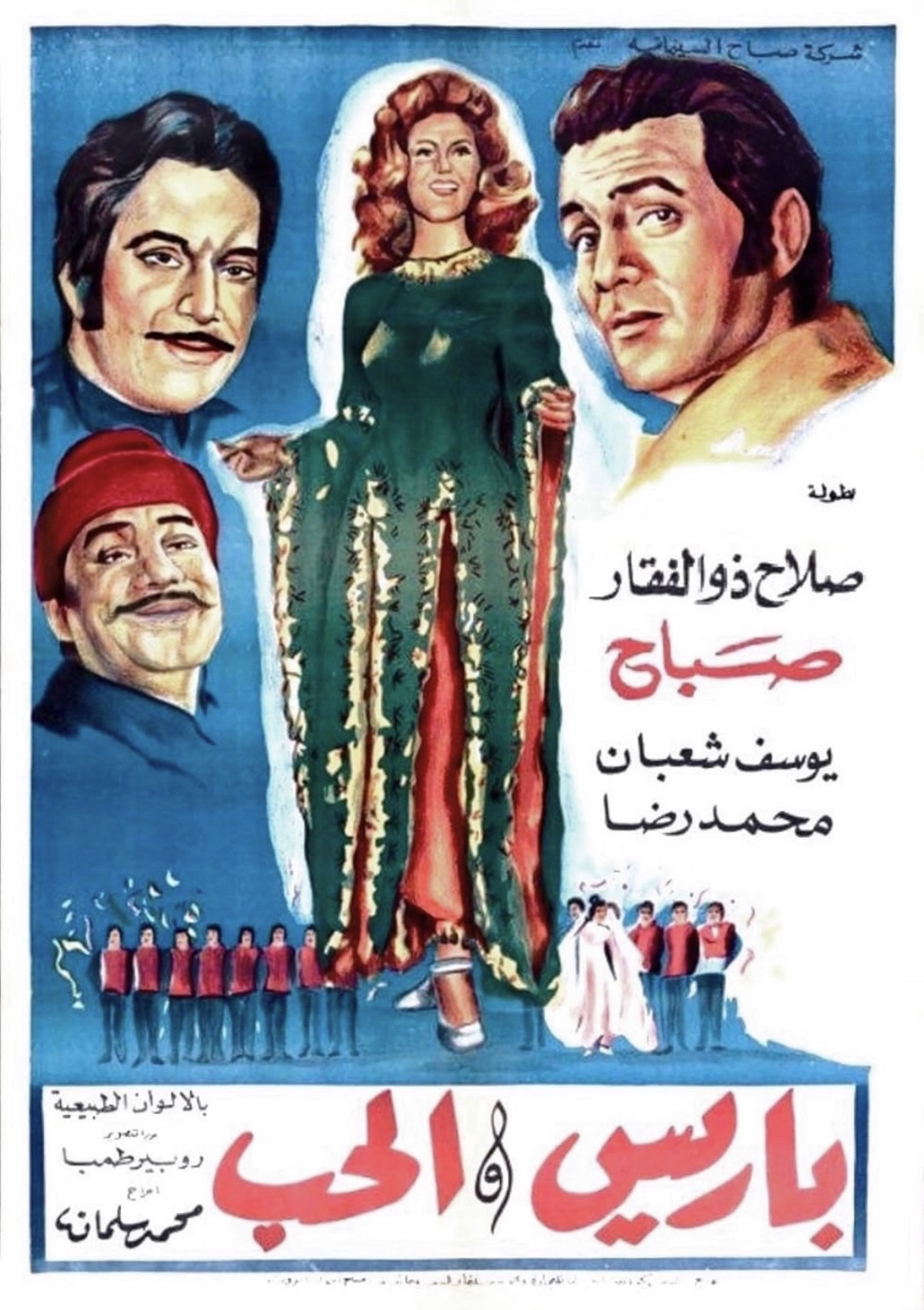
- Egyptian Arabic: باريس والحب
- Directed by: Mohamed Salman
- Written by: Mohamed Othman; Mohamed Salman
- Produced by: Mohamed El Nomeir
- Starring: Salah Zulfikar; Sabah
- Cinematography: Robert Tamba
- Edited by: Michelle Tamer
- Release dates: 10 March 1972 (Beirut, Lebanon)
- Running time: 102 minutes
- Countries: Lebanon; Egypt
- Language: Egyptian Arabic

Paris and Love (Egyptian Arabic: باريس والحب, translit: Paris wal Hob or Baris walhabu) is a 1972 romantic drama starring Salah Zulfikar and Sabah. It is directed by Mohamed Salman.

== Plot ==
The film revolves around a poor family that financially depends heavily on their daughter, Halla, who works as a singer in small bars. One day, the daughter meets Aziz, a young millionaire who returns from Paris and she falls in love with him. The family encourages this relationship until she marries this millionaire in order to lift them out of poverty in which they live. However, Halla refuses to consummate the marriage due to the disparity in the social level but she's still in love with Aziz.

== Primary cast ==
- Salah Zulfikar as Aziz
- Sabah as Halla
- Yousuf Shaaban as Mounir
- Mohammad Reda as Raouf
- Samira Baroudi as Rime
- Akram El Ahmar
- Silvana Badrakhan
- Samir Abu Said

== See also ==
- Cinema of Egypt
- Cinema of Lebanon
- List of Egyptian films
- List of Lebanese films
- Salah Zulfikar filmography
