= The Peacock (1982 film) =

1982 film

- Arabic: الطاووس
- Directed by: Kamal El Sheikh
- Written by: Abdelhay Adib
- Produced by: Nadia Hamza
- Starring: Nour El-Sherif; Salah Zulfikar; Laila Taher; Raghda
- Cinematography: Ramses Marzouk
- Edited by: Hassan Helmy
- Distributed by: Nahed Farid Shawqi Films
- Release date: 27 September 1982 (Egypt)
- Running time: 115 minutes
- Country: Egypt
- Language: Egyptian Arabic

The Peacock (Arabic: الطاووس, translit: Al-Tawous) is an Egyptian crime thriller film released in 1982. It stars Nour El-Sherif, Salah Zulfikar, Laila Taher and Raghda. The film is directed by Kamal El Sheikh and written by Abdelhay Adib.

== Plot ==
Nadia is married to Hamdi and they live with Samiha; the younger sister of Nadia, their uncle Hussein is a Forensic psychologist. Hamdi is secretly in love with his wife's sister but he can't do anything about it, until one day he murders his wife and try to win her sister’s heart but her uncle Hussein knows about the crime of Hamdi and he tries with the help of the police to make him fall into their trap without knowing.

== Cast ==
- Nour El-Sherif as Hamdi
- Salah Zulfikar as Hussein
- Laila Taher as Nadia
- Raghda as Samiha
- Salah Rashwan as Nabil
- Adel Hashem as the investigator
- Muhammad Safwat as Police officer
- Fadia Okasha as Enayat
- Diaa Al-Mirghani as The pickpocket
- Youssef Al-Assal as Receptionist
- Ikhlas Hosni
- Bassem Sedky
- Fouad Atallah
- Mustafa Al-Mahdi
- Nassif Abul-Enein
- Hassan Totala
- Samia Samy

== Reception ==
The film was a box-office and critical success. Main cast actor Salah Zulfikar won the Ministry of Culture award in best actor role.

== See also ==
- Salah Zulfikar filmography
- List of Egyptian films of 1982
