= List of Egyptian films of 1967 =

A list of films produced in Egypt in 1967. For an A-Z list of films currently on Wikipedia, see Category:Egyptian films.

== 1967 ==
Title	Director	Cast	Genre	Notes
1967
El Zawga El Thania (The Second Wife)	Salah Abu Seif	Salah Mansour, Sanaa Gamil, Souad Hosni, Shoukry Sarhan		
Quasr El Shawq	Hassan El Imam	Nadia Lutfi, Yehia Chahine, Abdel Moneim Ibrahim, Magda El-Khatib		Second part of Naguib Mahfouz trilogy
Karamet Zawgaty (My Wife’s Dignity)	Fatin Abdel Wahab	Salah Zulfikar, Shadia	Romantic comedy	
Khan el khalili	Atef Salem	Samira Ahmed, Emad Hamdy, Hassan Youssef (actor)		Entered into the 5th Moscow International Film Festival
