= Love and Adoration =

1960 film

- Directed by: Hassan el-Imam
- Written by: Hassan el-Imam; Youssef Eissa
- Produced by: Dinar Film
- Starring: Salah Zulfikar; Taheyya Kariokka
- Cinematography: Wadeed Serry
- Edited by: Said El-Sheikh
- Music by: Fouad El-Zahery
- Production company: Dinar Film
- Distributed by: Dollar Film
- Release date: January 1, 1960
- Country: Egypt
- Language: Egyptian Arabic

Love and Adoration (Egyptian Arabic: حب حتى العبادة, translit. Hubb hata Al-Ebada or Houbb Hatta Al-Ibadah, aliases: Divine Love or Worship Love, French: Amour et Adoration) is a 1960 Egyptian romance film, written and directed by Hassan el-Imam. It stars Salah Zulfikar and Taheyya Kariokka.

== Plot ==
Abdel Hamid Sabry, a lawyer who’s married to Aisha, and they are happily married, and they had one son, Hussein (Salah Zulfikar), until Latifa Hanim entered their lives, and seduced Abd al-Hamid until she marries him. He lived with her until she worked as a dancer, while Abdel Hamid discovered that his wife Latifa had an affair with his friend Ahmed Hamed, he divorced her after issuing a report in the Montazah police department, and Latifa married her lover Ahmed Hamed, and gave birth to a daughter, Naima, while Abdel Hamid searched for work everywhere, he did not find any. El-Dada Fahima raised Hussein until he grew up and graduated from the Faculty of Engineering, and joined the work of the Sebahi Textile Company in Alexandria. Meeting her mother, Latifa Hanim, especially since the engineer, Ahmed Fahmy, a colleague in the company, not only competed with Hussein for the presidency of the labor union, but also competed with him for the heart of Naima, and intended to propose to her, and Hussein told his father about his love for Naima and his desire to marry her, but when Abdel Hamid learned that Naima was the daughter of Latifa Hanim, his treacherous wife, he refused that attachment strongly, for fear that the daughter would be like her mother, but he did not explain the reasons for the refusal to his son Hussein, who didn’t accept his father’s refusal, and went to meet Latifa Hanim, who also refused Hussein's request, after his father, Abd al-Hamid, preceded him and warned her against marrying her daughter, Naima, to his son, Hussein. Latifa Hanim was forced to accept the offer of engineer Ahmed Fahmy, and agreed to marry him to her daughter, who strongly refused. Hussein was deeply shocked by his father's rejection and Naima's mother's rejection, and he felt that there was a secret that everyone was hiding from him, so he boycotted his father, and took the opportunity to hold the annual Cairo Industrial and Agricultural Exhibition, and traveled to Cairo to supervise the company's products at the exhibition, and during the rest period, he met the dancer in the horse racing circuit, Aisha, who invited him to see her at the Continental Casino in which she works, and with Aisha he found his solace after the shock of the failure of his marriage to Naima. Each of them felt that something mysterious was stronger than him, pulling them together, and engineer Ahmed Fahmy sent someone to photograph Hussein with the dancer, to take advantage of the photos to distort the image of Hussein, who was competing with him for the presidency of the syndicate, as well as for the heart of Naima, who still had hope for Hussein. He showed the photos to the factory workers, so that they would turn against Hussein. He also showed the photos to Naima to turn her against Hussein. Abdel Hamid was afraid for his son when he learned of his relationship with a dancer, so he traveled to Cairo to meet with him, advising him to stay away from the dancer, but he met with the dancer in the hotel by chance, and learned that Aisha who is the biological mother of his son, is herself the dancer who is in a relationship with his son. He was shocked, and he had to tell her that Hussein was her son, and he asked her to return to remarry him, but she refused so as not to distort her image with Hussein as his mother, and she asked him not to tell him her truth, and she decided to move away from Hussein and breakup with him. Abdel Hamid was forced to tell his son the truth about his mother, and that she was his wife and he is the reason for what she reached, and that he hurt her and deserves punishment, and he did not bear the admonition of his son, and suddenly, he died. Hussein went to his mother, Aisha, and told her that he had learned the truth, and accompanied her to Alexandria to live with him. Ahmed Fahmy spread rumors that Hussein had brought the dancer to live with him in his house, after the death of his father, but Hussein told the factory workers that this woman was his mother, not his mistress, and it is true that she is a dancer, but he cannot abandon her because she is his mother, and Naima returned to Hussein after knowing the truth, but Latifa Hanim confronted her former co-wife, Aisha, to prevent her daughter from marrying her son, but Aisha exposed her in front of her daughter, Naima, that she caused her for being divorced from her husband and deprived her of her son, while she took a lover until her husband divorced her and she married her lover, and Naima could not abandon her mother, despite her dissatisfaction with her behavior. Finally, Naima married Hussein, who won the presidency of the union by landslide, and engineer Ahmed Fahmy apologized to him.

== Cast ==
- Salah Zulfikar as Hussein
- Taheyya Kariokka as Aisha
- Hussein Riad as Abdel Hamid
- Zuzu Nabil as Latifa Hanem
- Omar Al-Hariri as Ahmed Fahmy
- Ferdoos Mohammed as El-Dada Fahima
- Zizi El Badrawy as Naima
- Laila Taher as Hussein's colleague
- Widad Hamdi as Widad, the servant
