= Wicked Game (film) =

- Arabic: لعبة الأشرار
- Directed by: Henry Barakat
- Written by: Hassan El Mamlook
- Produced by: Fouad El Alfi
- Starring: Salah Zulfikar
- Cinematography: Ali Khairallah
- Edited by: Fekry Rostom
- Release date: 1991
- Country: Egypt
- Language: Egyptian Arabic

Wicked Game (Arabic: لعبة الأشرار, translit: Loubat El Ashrar or Luebat al'ashrar or Lou’bat Al-Achrar aliases: The Game of the Wicked) is an Egyptian crime thriller released in 1991. It stars Salah Zulfikar and is directed by Henry Barakat.

== Synopsis ==
Author Riyad Kamel marries the beautiful Camelia despite her previous relationship with Azmi, his lawyer. While Azmi marries Manar, who is Raiyad's secretary. Manar suspects that Azmi and Camellia are back together. She records a tape for Camelia urging Azmi to kill Manar and Riyad, so she plots to take them down.

== Main cast ==
- Salah Zulfikar
- Athar El-Hakim
- Samir Sabri
- Safaa El Sabaa
- Awatef Abdel Fattah
- Ziad Mukouk
- Salah Azzam
- Fadi Yazbek
- Ahmed Fouad El Alfi
