= A Bullet in the Heart (play) =

Egyptian play

- Directed by: Kamal Hussein
- Written by: Tawfiq El-Hakim
- Starring: Salah Zulfikar
- Production companies: General Egyptian Organization for Cinema and Theater
- Distributed by: General Egyptian Organization for Cinema and Theater
- Release date: 22 November 1964
- Running time: 3 hours
- Country: Egypt
- Language: Arabic

A Bullet in the Heart (Arabic: رصاصة في القلب; translit.Rosasa Fil Qalb) is a 1964 Egyptian comedy play written by Tawfiq El-Hakim and directed by Kamal Hussein. It is based on Tawfiq El-Hakim's 1926 play with the same name.

It stars Salah Zulfikar in the leading role. This play is one of three plays of El-Hakim, in which the conclusion was open and unconvincing in that way, and it was Salah Zulfikar's theatrical debut.

== Synopsis ==
The events revolve around Naguib, who has a dire financial situation, who falls in love with the girl Fifi at first sight and does not know who she is, so he tells his friend, Dr. Sami, the story and she's originally his friend's fiancé.

== Primary cast ==
- Salah Zulfikar as Naguib
- Laila Taher as Fifi
- Waheed Ezzat as Dr. Sami
- Abdul Mohsen Saleem
- Ahmed Hussein
- Badruddin Hassanein
