= Monsieur le Directeur =

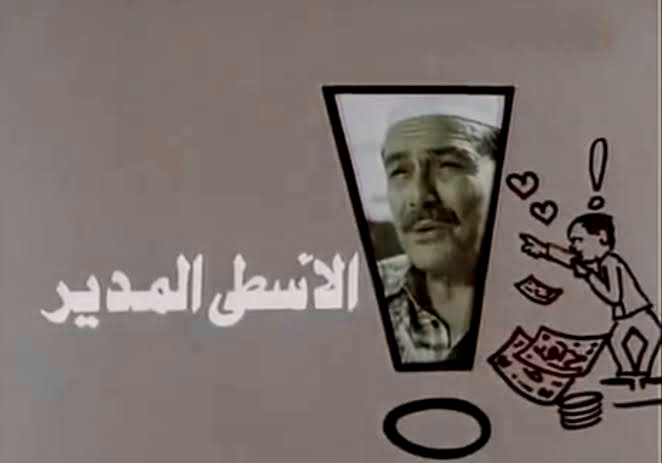
- Film Poster
- Arabic: الأسطي المدير
- Directed by: Shafik Shameya
- Written by: Katia Thabet; Samir Awad
- Screenplay by: Raouf Helmi
- Produced by: Mamdouh El Leithy
- Starring: Salah Zulfikar; Laila Taher
- Cinematography: Adel Abdelazeem
- Edited by: Shaaban Abdel-gawad
- Music by: Hany Shenooda
- Production company: TV Films A.R.E.
- Distributed by: Financial and Economic Affairs Sector - R.T.U - A.R.E
- Release date: 1988
- Running time: 103 minutes
- Country: Egypt
- Language: Egyptian Arabic

Monsieur le Directeur (Arabic: الأسطي المدير, translit: Elosta El Modeer, aliases: Handyman General Manager or The Engraver Manager) is a 1988 Egyptian drama television film. it stars Salah Zulfikar and Laila Taher.

== Synopsis ==
The family of Hassanein, the senior government employee, suffers from financial troubles, making him unable to meet the needs of his family, a rich family proposes to marry their son Medhat to their daughter Mervat, so that the father falls into a financial predicament, which forces him to pursue the profession of engraver, in order to be able to meet his family's needs, which causes many problems.

== Cast ==
- Salah Zulfikar as Hassanein Abdel-Dayem
- Laila Taher as Adeela henem
- Mahmoud El-Gendy as Ismail
- Mustafa Metwalli as Medhat
- Fatma Mazhar as Azhar
- Azza Gamal as Mervat
- Soad Hussein as Shogoun
- Nazim Shaarawy as El-Messlimany
- Magdy Imam as Emad
- Gamal Ismail as Stoohi Abuzeid
- Child: Raafat Maher as Samy Hassanein
- Thanaa Lamloum as Mona
- Ahmed Abu Obeya as Abdelhamid
- Abul Fotouh Amara as Tantawi
- Anwar Madkour as Manager
- Mustafa al-Kawawi as Hassanein assistant
- Nazmi Rizk as Talaat the lawyer
- Samir Rostom as Coiffeur
- Hamdi Sharif as Saleh
- Sayed Mostafa as Salesman
- Muhammad al-Qassas as Gaber
- Abdel Aziz Issa as Salesman
- Mahmoud Hafnawi as Sabi
- Nawal Hashem as Hosneya
- Hareedy Omran as Mahmoud
- Tawfiq al-Kurdi as Furniture salesman
- Maysa Fathi as Extra
- Farida Abdel Aal as Extra
- Sawsan Salem as Extra
- Ahmed Badr as Extra
- Farouz al-Shahawi as Extra
- Awatef Abdel Fattah as Extra
- Muhammadin Nassar as Extra
- Mousa Salem as Extra

== Reception ==
The film was a critical success and discussed an important issue concerning economic problems for Egyptian families.
