= Nadia Hamza =

Egyptian filmmaker

- Born: 1939 (age 86–87); Port Said, Cairo
- Citizenship: Egypt
- Occupations: Film director, producer and screenwriter.
- Notable work: The Peacock

Nadia Hamza (born 1939 in Port Said) is an Egyptian film director, producer and screenwriter. Before directing, Hamza worked as a scriptwriter, assistant and producer. She became a successful director and screenwriter known for making films with female leads discussing women aspirations and experiences. In 1994 she founded her own production company, Seven Stars Studio and began collaborating with other Egyptian filmmakers. Nadia believes that women director's differ from their male counterpart in regards to the subject of a film and how they handle and use the camera. She was known for portraying women and challenges societal views on working women. She has her female character's be portrayed as winners and concentrates on women's issues, especially working women.

== Early life ==
Nadia was born in the city of Port Said, North of Cairo in 1939. Hamza worked as a journalist in the arts section of 'Al Goumhouriah' newspaper when her family moved to Cairo. She later found a job at a popular Egyptian magazine, 'Al Kawakeb' which led her to making connections with artists, actors, producers and film directors. She took a course in script writing at the Cinema Institute and became an assistant to her teacher Niazi Mustafa who was also a film director.

== Career ==
Her first feature and directorial debut, Sea of Fantasy/ Bahr al-awham (1984), was critically acclaimed by North African and Middle Eastern film critics. Nadia started to direct and produce a new feature every year with Women/ Al-Nisa in 1985, Women Behind Bars/ Nisa Khalfa al-qoudban in 1986, A Woman’s Greed/Hiq Imra’ah in 1987, The Woman and the Law/ Al-Mar’ah wa-I-qanoun and Women, Alas!/ Imra’ah li-I-asaf in 1988. Hamza earned her first wage as an assistant film director to Niazi Mustafa on 'Saghira Ala Al Hobb' (1966). Hamza later became known as a feminist filmmaker known for presenting women as they are, rather than the popular image in Egyptian melodramas.

== Filmography ==
Producer

- The Peacock/Al Tawoos (1982)

Director

- Sea of Fantasy/ Bahr al-awham (1984)
- Women/ Al-Nisa (1985)
- Women Behind Bars/ Nisa Khalfa al-qoudban (1986)
- A Woman’s Greed/Hiq Imra’ah (1987)
- The Woman and the Law/ Al-Mar’ah wa-I-qanoun (1988)
- Unfortunately Woman/ Imra’ah li-I-asaf (1988)
- Ma'araket Alnaqeeb Nadia (1990)
- Nesaa Sa'aleek (1991)
- Emra'a Wa Emra'a (1995)
- Wehyat Alby Wa Afraho (2000)

Assistant Director

- 'Saghira Ala Al Hobb (1966)
