= Last Night (1964 film) =

1964 film

- Directed by: Kamal El Sheikh
- Written by: Youssef El Sebai
- Produced by: Gamal Ellythi
- Starring: Faten Hamama
- Cinematography: Abdelhalim Nasr
- Release date: 1964
- Country: Egypt
- Language: Arabic

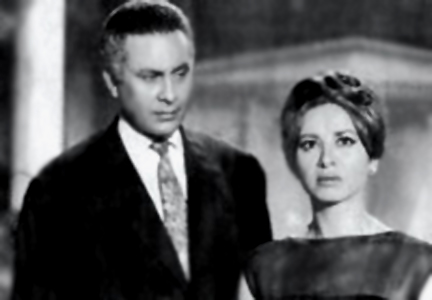
Still of Mahmoud Mursi and Faten Hamama in Al laila Al Akhira ("Last Night")

Last Night (Arabic: الليلة الأخيرة, translit. Al-Laylah al-Akheera) is a 1964 Egyptian mystery film directed by Kamal El Sheikh. It was entered into the 1964 Cannes Film Festival.

== Cast ==
- Faten Hamama - Nadia and her sister Fawzya
- Ahmed Mazhar - Dr. Ahmed
- Mahmoud Moursy - Shoukry
- Madiha Salem - Daughter of Nadia
- Abdel Khalek Saleh

== Synopsis ==
Faten Hamama plays a wife who wakes up one morning to discover she is married to her brother-in-law in this suspenseful drama. The confused woman soon learns that fifteen years have gone by and that she was injured in a bomb blast that killed her sister.
