= Laila Taher =

Egyptian actress

- ليلي طاهر
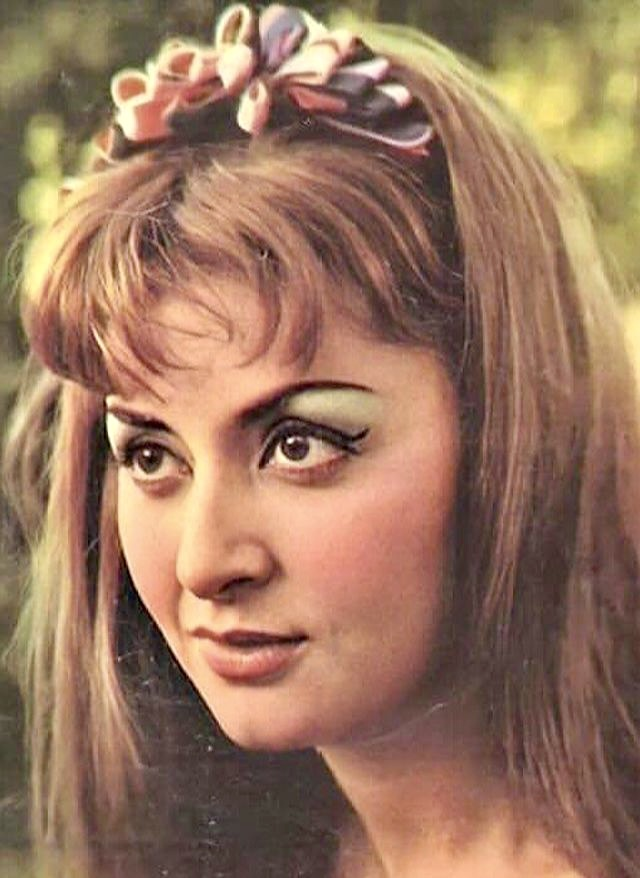
- Laila Taher in 1968
- Born: Sherouette Moustafa Ibrahim شيرويت مصطفى إبراهيم; 13 March 1942 (age 84); Cairo, Kingdom of Egypt
- Occupation: Actress • television presenter
- Years active: 1958–2021
- Spouse(s): Mohamed El-Sherbiny; Nabil Esmat; Hussein Fawzy; Youssef Shaaban; Khaled El-Amir
- Children: 1

Laila Taher (born 1942, Arabic: ليلي طاهر, Sherouette Moustafa Ibrahim, Arabic: شيرويت مصطفي إبراهيم) is an Egyptian film, stage, television actress and presenter who is mostly known for her successful collaborations with Salah Zulfikar in film, television and theater. She participated in over hundred artworks through her career mostly in television. In films, Taher is known for her notable roles in; Saladin the Victorious (1963), Soft Hands (1963), A Husband on Vacation (1964), Al Qadisiyya (1981), and The Peacock (1982). And her television roles include; Monsieur Le Directeur (1988) and The Family of Mr. Shalash (1990).

== Early life ==
Sherouette Moustafa Ibrahim was born on 13 March 1942 in Cairo to an Egyptian family, her father was an agricultural engineer and her mother a housewife. Her family took care of her education until she obtained a bachelor's degree in social work.

== Career ==
She holds a bachelor's degree in social work and was supposed to be a social worker, as her father had planned, but her tendency to acting while studying at the university prevented her parents from achieving her plan.

The life of fame as a TV presenter began with the beginning of the Egyptian television broadcast in 1960, where she was collected by many meetings and situations with the television director Robert Sayegh, who was one of the first generation of television directors, as he helped and encouraged her and her family until she became a successful broadcaster to present many important programs. The most prominent of which was the (TV Magazine) program, which was presented for a long time even after Ramses Naguib discovered and chose her stage name from the heroines of Ihsan Abdel Quddous's novels.

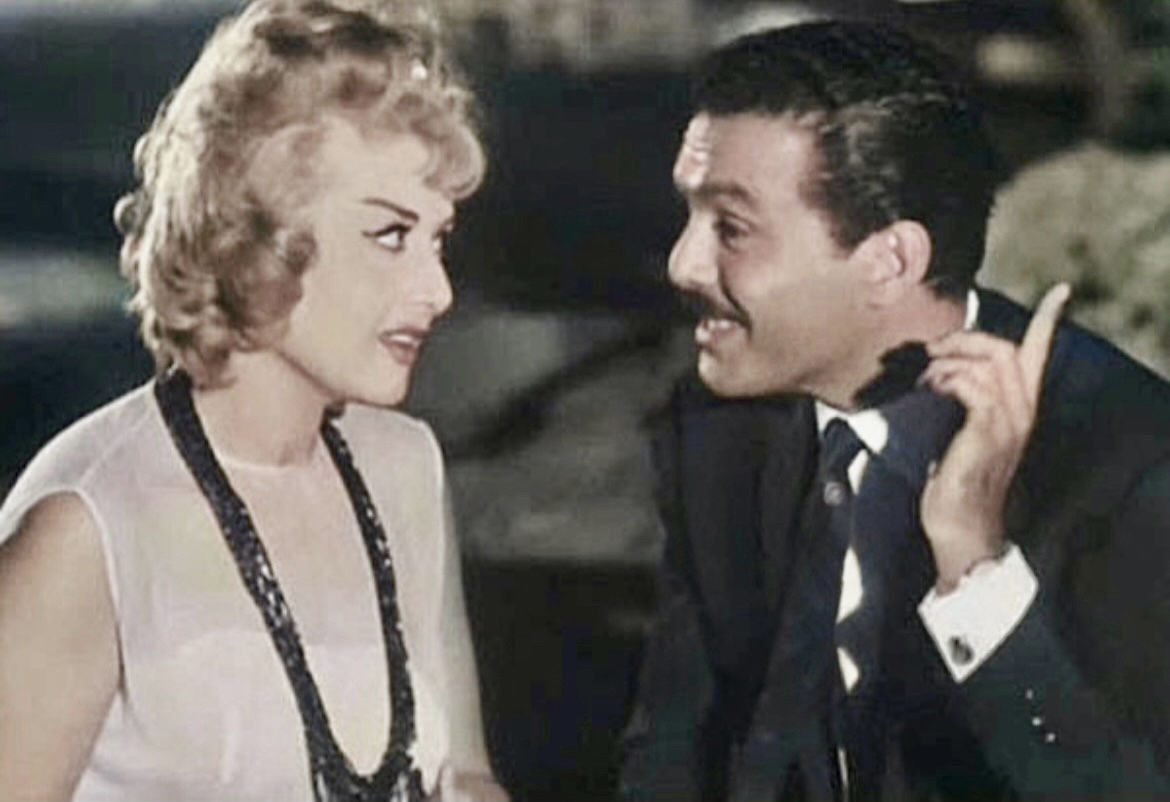
With Salah Zulfikar in A Husband on Vacation (1964)

She chose Laila for her love and intense love for the late singer Laila Mourad, and she says about herself: My beginning in the Egyptian cinema was through Abu Hadid (1958), in which I played a supporting the role with actor Farid Shawqi. After she refused to be hired as a full-time television presenter she became a full time actress.

Her real breakthrough to fame was in 1964, when she was paired with box-office mogul Salah Zulfikar, and won her first leading role opposite him in A Husband on Vacation (1964), the film was a box office hit. Taher says about this film: It is one of the most important films of my career, in addition to Soft Hands (1963) and Saladin the Victorious (1963). She formed a lovely duet with Salah Zulfikar in over twenty artworks in film, television and in stage. In 2021, she announced her full retirement from acting.

== Personal life ==
She married six times, and her first husband was Mohamed El-Sherbiny, with whom she gave birth to her only son, Ahmed. After their separation, she married director Hussein Fawzy, then she was divorced and married journalist Nabil Esmat.

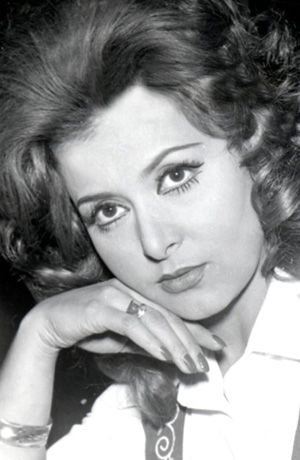
Taher in 1968

After her divorce, she married actor Yousuf Shaaban and separated from him and married music composer Khaled Al-Amir. After her separation from him, she married her last husband outside movie business.

== Selected filmography ==
=== Films ===
- 1958: Abu Hadid
- 1960: Love and Adoration
- 1960: Ya Habibi
- 1961: El Hub Keda
- 1961: Waheeda
- 1961: The Sun Will Never Set
- 1962: Struggle of the Heroes
- 1963: Saladin the Victorious
- 1963: Soft Hands
- 1963: Hero till the End
- 1964: A Husband on Vacation
- 1965: Artistic Director
- 1971: Confessions of a Woman
- 1975: I Want a Solution
- 1981: Al Qadisiyya
- 1982: The Peacock
- 1984: The Addict
- 1987: I Wanted to Apologize
- 1988: Red Mourning Clothes
- 1988: Monsieur le Directeur
- 1989: Mr Aliwa's Apartment
- 1992: Anything But My Daughter
- 2008: Ramadan Mabrouk Abu al-Alamein Hamouda

=== On stage ===
- 1964: A Bullet in the Heart
- 1966: Afifi's Loves
- 1973: A Man for Every Home
- 1983: The Marital Happiness Trap
- 1986: Watch out, couples!
- 1988: The Lost Day

=== Television ===
- 1979: The Searcher
- 1982: Detective Inspector
- 1990: The Family of Mr Shalash
- 1991: The Peacock
- 2009: Monsieur Ramadan Mabrouk.
