= Salah Zulfikar =

Egyptian actor and producer (1926–1993)

ORE Salah Zulfikar
- صلاح ذو الفقار
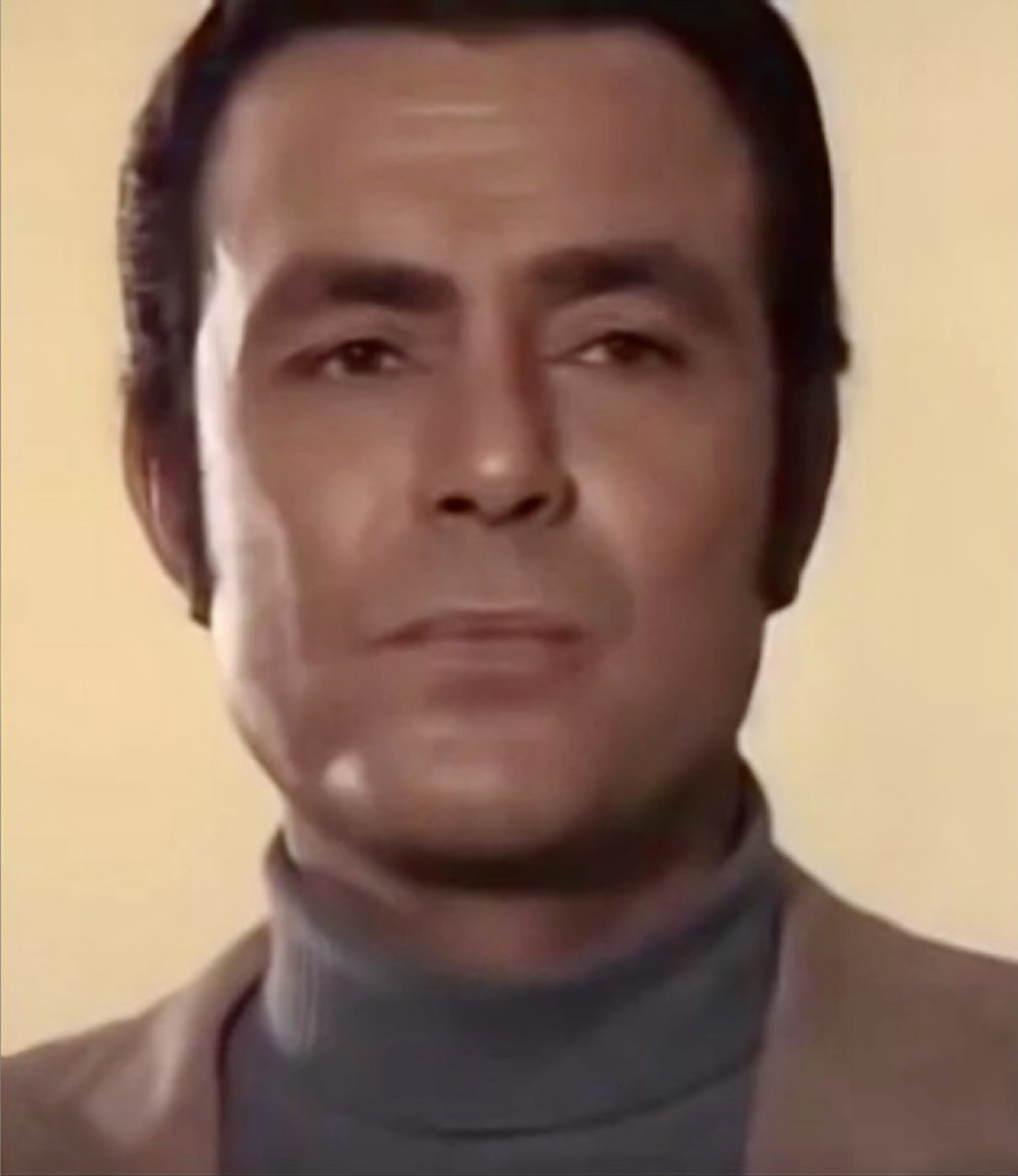
- Zulfikar, c. 1971
- Born: Salah El-Din Ahmed Mourad Zulfikar; 18 January 1926; El Mahalla El Kubra, Gharbia, Kingdom of Egypt
- Died: 22 December 1993 (aged 67); Zamalek, Cairo, Egypt
- Resting place: Cairo, Egypt
- Other names: Fares el-Ahlam; El-Abqary
- Education: Egyptian Police Academy
- Occupations: Police officer; actor; film producer
- Years active: 1956–1993
- Organizations: Ezz El-Dine Zulficar Films Company; Salah Zulfikar Films Company
- Works: Full list
- Height: 1.80 m (5 ft 11 in)
- Spouses: Nafisa Bahgat (m. 1947; died 1988) Zahret El-Ola (m. 1957; div. 1959) Shadia (m. 1964; div. 1970) Bahiga Mekbel (m. 1976)
- Children: Ahmed; Mona
- Father: Ahmed Mourad Bey Zulfikar
- Family: Zulfikar family
- Honours: Order of the Republic – Grand Cordon; Order of Sciences and Arts
- Police career
- Allegiance: Egypt
- Branch: Egyptian National Police
- Service years: 1946–1957
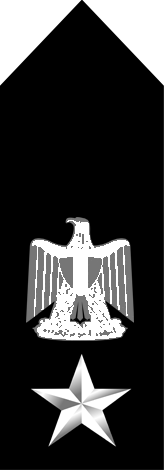
- Rank: Lieutenant colonel
- Awards: Medal of Military Duty

Salah El-Din Ahmed Mourad Zulfikar (Arabic: صلاح الدين أحمد مراد ذو الفقار, pronounced [sˤɑˈlɑːħ zolfɑqˈqɑːɾ]; 18 January 1926 – 22 December 1993) was an Egyptian actor and film producer. He started his career as a police officer, before becoming an actor in 1956. He is regarded as one of the most influential actors in the history of Egyptian film industry, who had notable roles in over a hundred feature films in multiple genres during his 37-year career, mostly as the leading actor. Late in his career, he had considerable success in television roles.

Born to a noble family, Zulfikar graduated from the Egyptian Police Academy in 1946. He was one of Egypt's heroes in its battle against the occupation while serving in the police. His son, entrepreneur Ahmed Zulfikar, mentioned in a 1994 press interview that his father participated in the guerrilla war in Ismailia against the British Forces in 1944, and described his patriotism as having been “without limits”. Afterwards, Zulfikar volunteered in the Battle of Ismailia of 1952, and in the 1956 Suez War. He was awarded the Medal of Military Duty (first class) from Egyptian President Gamal Abdel Nasser, in appreciation for his efforts in serving his country.

In 1955, he began his career as a part-time actor with temporary permits from Ministry of Interior to work in his first film; Wakeful Eyes released in 1956. Later, he went on to be a full time actor in late 1957. He established his first film production company with his elder brother Ezz El-Dine Zulficar in 1958. He ran his new business under the trade name of Ezz El-Dine Zulficar Films. In 1962, he founded Salah Zulfikar Films Company and operated in Egypt and the Arab world for almost 16 years. Through Zulfikar's two production companies, which he ran throughout his 20-year career as a film producer, he won numerous awards, with the majority of his films becoming box-office successes. He was one of the most dominant leading men in Egyptian cinema. Despite starting his acting career as a film actor, he also worked in theater throughout his career, playing some celebrated theatrical roles. Zulfikar is one of the most famous artistic figures in Egypt and the Arab world. His contributions to film, television, theatre and radio as an actor and film producer earned him a worldwide reputation that made him one of the most influential Middle Eastern and Arab public figures in the 20th century. In 1996, in the centenary of Egyptian cinema, ten of his films as an actor and five of his films as a producer were listed in the top one hundred Egyptian films of the 20th century.

== Early life and education ==
Salah El-Din Ahmed Mourad Zulfikar was born on January 18, 1926, in El Mahalla El Kubra, Gharbia, to an aristocratic family of prominent position in Egypt. His father Ahmed Mourad Bey Zulfikar (1888–1945), was a senior police commissioner in the Ministry of Interior, and his mother, Nabila Hanem Zulfikar, was a housewife. Zulfikar was the seventh of eight siblings. His father had a remarkable impact on his sons in terms of commitment, loyalty, integrity and self-reliance. His military background did not limit his family's interest in culture, arts and the Egyptian political life in general. His eldest brother, Mohamed, was a doctor and a businessman, two elder sisters were Soad and Fekreya. Another brother was Mahmoud, a filmmaker and a major figure in Egyptian film industry; he initially studied to become an architect. His brother Ezz El-Dine was also a remarkable filmmaker and graduated as a military officer, Kamal was a military officer. His younger brother Mamdouh was a businessman.

Zulfikar excelled in his studies and was an athlete. He was one of Egypt's champions in boxing and won the King's Cup in featherweight in 1947. Besides boxing, he played shooting and he was an active player in the Police Academy football team. He initially joined the Faculty of Medicine, Alexandria University, to please his father, who wished Zulfikar to become a doctor like his grandfather. After his father became sick, he transferred his admission to the Police Academy so he could stay in Cairo beside his father. He graduated in 1946. Salah Zulfikar was appointed to the Menoufia Security Directorate and the Prisons Authority, specifically Egypt Prison, and also worked as a teacher at the Police Academy.

== Police career ==
While studying in Police Academy, Zulfikar participated in the guerrilla war of Ismailia against the British forces in 1944. Zulfikar graduated in 1947, he was assigned immediately in Monufia Governorate Police force. A year later he was assigned in prison of Cairo which was responsible for prisoners including Anwar Sadat (President of Egypt in 1970) in 1947.

In 1949, Zulfikar started teaching and became a professor at the Police Academy. He was in charge of the unit of fresh students. He had a saying "the unit of fresh students is a manhood factory". He was a skillful officer known for his professionalism and high moral standards.

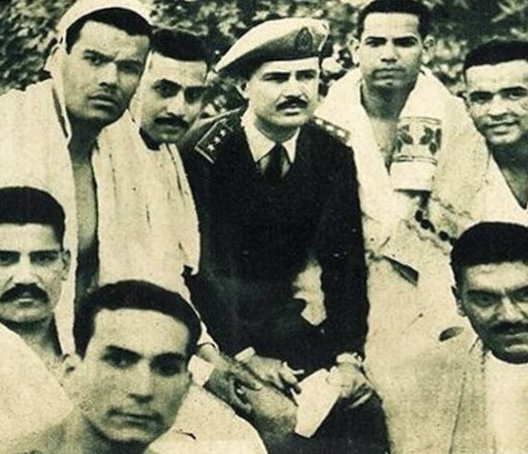
Salah Zulfikar between his students in Suez, 1956

In 1952 he volunteered to join the police unit in Ismaïlia which was under attack by the British Army. The Egyptian police force refused to hand over their weapons to the British forces, which led the British army to bring in tanks to capture the building. The ensuing battle of Ismailia was later commemorated and is now celebrated in Egypt on 25 January of every year as National Police Day. Zulfikar received a National Award of Honor for his bravery.

In 1956 Suez war, Zulfikar took the initiative leading 19 of his students in the Police Academy and volunteered as commandos resisting the tripartite attack by the British, French and Israeli armies. Zulfikar also received the Medal of Military Duty (first Class) from President Gamal Abdel Nasser for risking his life for his country with bravery and honor.

== Acting career ==
=== 1955–1959: early career and breakthrough ===
Zulfikar's elder brothers Ezz El-Dine Zulfikar and Mahmoud Zulfikar were film directors. During his free time he used to attend film shooting. In 1955, his brother, Ezz El-Dine, tried to convince Zulfikar to start acting but he refused for he thought it is an impossible idea due to the nature of his job as a police officer. Finally under Ezz El-Dine's persistence, he agreed and was granted a temporary permit from the Minister of the Interior, which was headed at the time by Zakaria Mohieddin to take the leading role in Wakeful Eyes, released in 1956.

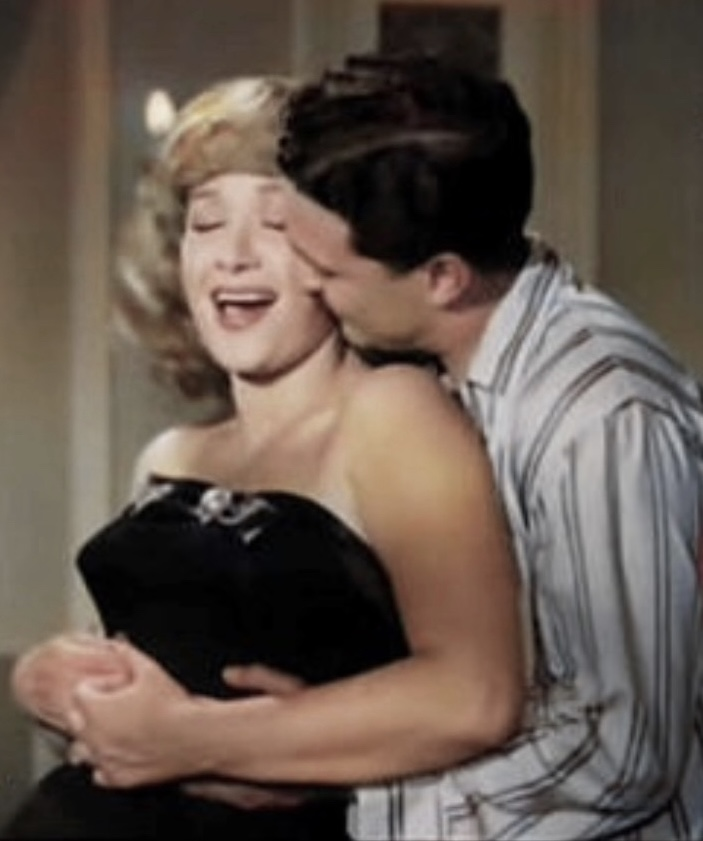
Zulfikar romantically embracing Huda Sultan in Forbidden Women (1959)

His second role was Hussein Abdel Wahed in Return My Heart (1957), Zulfikar was a natural and his performance gained public passion. The film was his first regional success, it was telling the story of the Egyptian revolution of 1952 and became a yearly celebration on the Egyptian state television on the 23rd of July. Zulfikar acted in both films with temporary permits. In 1958, he was cast by Youssef Chahine for Jamila, the Algerian (1958), he shared the lead with Magda and Ahmed Mazhar in which he played the role of Azzam. The film showed the struggle of the Algerian people against the French occupation during the Algerian War. In 1959, Zulfikar starred in six films including Ezz El-Dine Zulficar's The Second Man, and it earned him praise from Cairo critics. Followed by Hassan El Imam's Love and Adoration alongside Taheyya Kariokka, and his performance earned him favorable reviews. He played the lead in Forbidden Women (1959), a box-office hit alongside Huda Sultan. The commercial success of one film after another made Zulfikar a bankable star.

=== 1960s: stardom ===
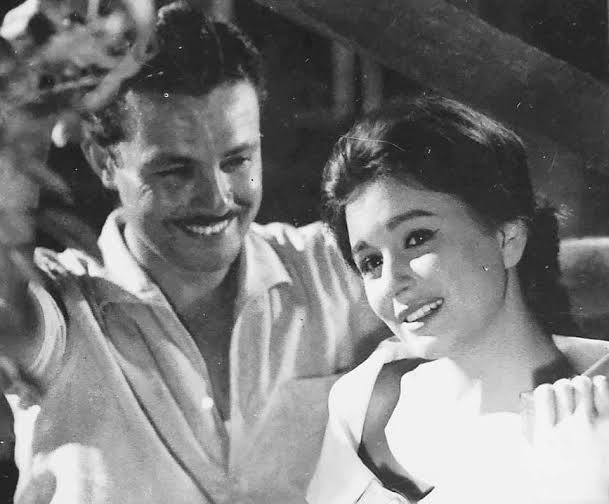
Zulfikar and Soad Hosny in Money and Women (1960)

Zulfikar's selection of diversified roles increased his popularity in Egypt and the Middle East. In 1960, he starred in Hassan El-Imam's I accuse, a thriller with Zulfikar sharing the lead with Zubaida Tharwat and Emad Hamdy. He starred in Niazi Mostafa's A Scrap of Bread (1960). He was paired with Soad Hosny for the first time in Hassan El Imam's Money and Women (1960), the film was a commercial success.

In 1961, Zulfikar starred in six films, the romantic comedy; That's What Love Is alongside Sabah was a great box-office success. Another romance was A Storm of Love (1961) co-starring Nahed Sherif in her first leading role, and the film was a commercial failure. He played his first villain role of his career, starring in Me and my Daughters (1961) alongside leading veteran actor Zaki Rostom supported by Nahed Sherif and Fayza Ahmed, and the film was a success. The following years, Zulfikar achieved success throughout the Middle East through multiple film genres. He shared the lead with Mariam Fakhr Eddine in horror film The Cursed Palace (1962), a box-office hit. He was paired with Soad Hosny for the second time in Ezz El-Dine Zulficar's A Date at the Tower (1962), the film was a box-office hit.

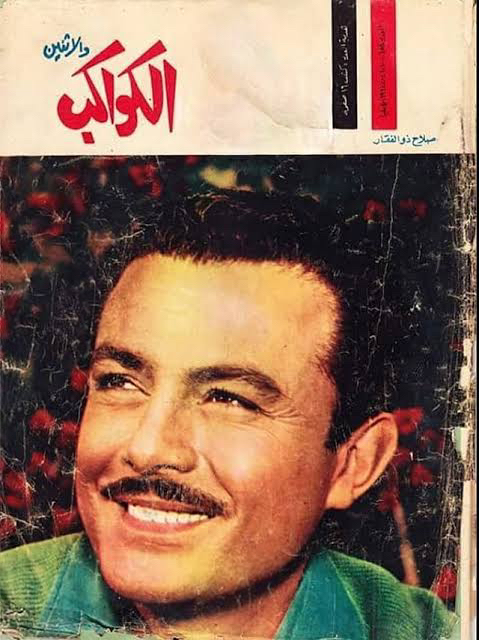
Zulfikar on the cover of Al-Kawakib magazine, March 1961

In 1963, unexpectedly, he appeared in only two films in co-starring roles. However, his role as Issa El Awam in Saladin the Victorious by Youssef Shahine was praised, and in the same year, he played Doctor Hamooda in Soft hands (1963) with his performance earning him state's award for best actor in a leading role. The film was a participant in 14th Berlin International Film Festival in 1964. Zulfikar starred in A Husband on Vacation, a romantic comedy providing the female lead Laila Taher her first leading role. In Italian cinema, he played a secondary role of an Egyptian police officer in the Italian film; Secret of the Sphinx (1964) directed by Duccio Tessari. After the film's release, Tessari asked Zulfikar to settle in Italy to earn better opportunities in Italian cinema but he refused and preferred to stay in Egypt. On stage, Zulfikar's debut was the 1964's A Bullet in the Heart alongside Laila Taher, it was based on Tawfiq al-Hakim's novel under the same name. The play was shown for a whole year in Cairo theaters.

The romantic drama; Aghla Min Hayati (1965) was successful and his performance is regarded as one of Zulfikar's greatest. It earned him state award for best actor in a leading role. In the following years, the film turned out to be a romantic classic and the two main characters of Ahmed and Mona became a symbol of love and affection among Egyptians. Fatin Abdel Wahab's romantic comedy trilogy; My Wife, the Director General (1966), My Wife's Dignity (1967), and My Wife's Goblin (1968) were a financial and critical success and the audience loved the duo of Zulfikar and Shadia.

In 1967, Zulfikar starred in the political play; Rubabikia (1967). In films, he co-starred in Kamal El Sheikh's The Man Who Lost His Shadow (1968), with a cast including Magda and Kamal el-Shennawi. In 1969, he starred in the comedy; Good Morning, My Dear Wife (1969). The film was a commercial hit in theaters in Egypt and the Arab world. This encouraged Zulfikar to give an opportunities to a new generation of actresses co-starring in his next films, such as Nelly, Mervat Amin and Naglaa Fathy.

=== 1970s: bankable star ===
Exceeding a decade as a bankable star in Egypt and the Arab world, in the 1970s, Zulfikar was focused on commercial success. He starred in My Husband's Wife (1970), a box-office hit alongside leading actresses; Nelly and Naglaa Fathi. In the same year, he earned critical recognition from Cairo critics for his performance as Amin Akef in Kamal El Sheikh's political thriller Sunset and Sunrise (1970), with Soad Hosny and Rushdy Abaza. His next role was Fahmy in Virgo (1970) with Zulfikar in the lead alongside Nahed Sherif, Adel Emam and Lebleba.

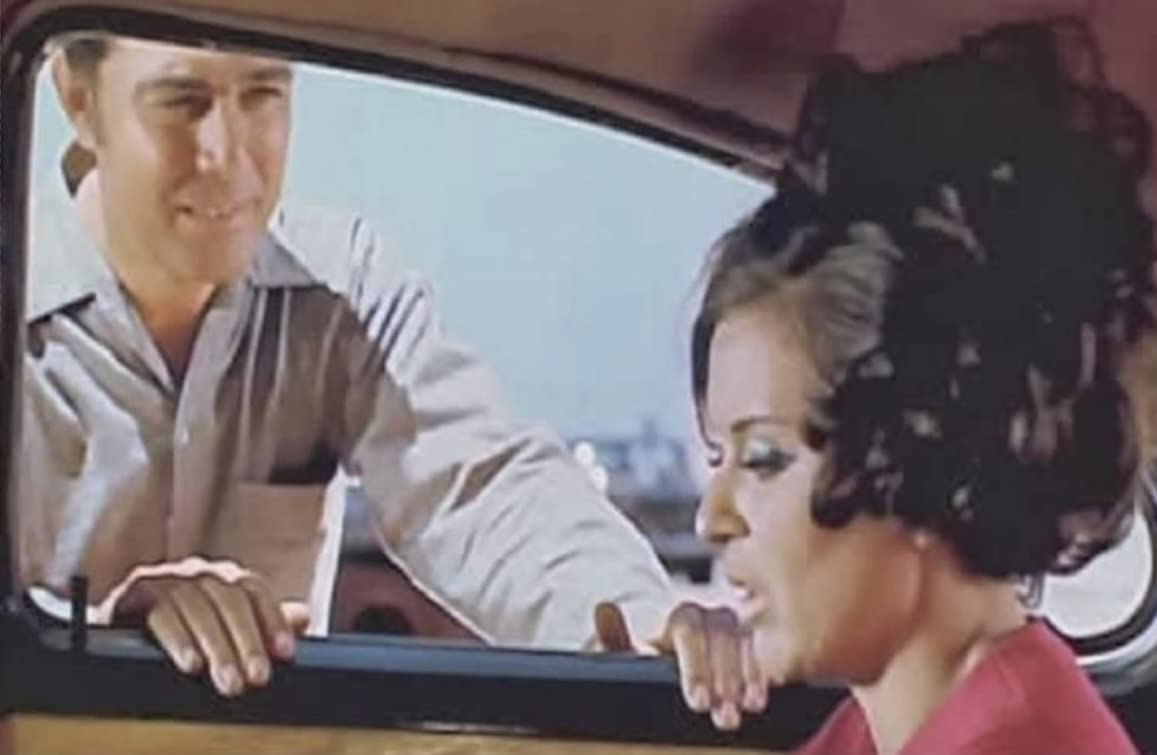
Zulfikar and Soad Hosny in Those People of the Nile (1972)

In 1971, he starred in the crime thriller; The Killers by Ashraf Fahmy, the film was a box office hit. In his six films of 1972, he starred in diversified roles such as; Featureless Men (1972) alongside actress Nadia Lutfi, the film was shot in 1970, released two years later and made good numbers in the box-office. In Lebanon, he was paired with Sabah for the sixth and last time in Paris and Love (1972), and the film was a commercial hit, the highest-grossing film in Lebanese theatres of the year, however it was received with mixed reviews by critics. Zulfikar partnered with Soad Hosny for the fourth time in Those People of the Nile (1972) directed by Youssef Chahine. On stage, Zulfikar played the role of a bachelor in the successful comedy; A Bachelor and Three Maidens (1972).

In 1973, Zulfikar played the lead in the Syrian romance Memory of a Night of Love (1973) alongside leading actresses Nelly, Nabila Ebeid, Muna Wassef, and Hala Shawkat, the film was successful in Syrian and Lebanese theaters. He played the role of his fellow Egyptian King Horemheb alongside Geraldine Chaplin in the short film Nefertiti and Akhenaton (Spanish: Nefertiti y Aquentos) (1973) directed by Raúl Araiza. Zulfikar starred in his psychological drama The Other Man (1973) in which he was also the executive producer, and the film was a box-office success.

He starred as Dr. Nabil, the psychiatrist treating a bunch of young men with serious issues by taking them on a summer trip to start treatment in In Summer We Must Love (1974), a comedy starring Nour El-Sherif, Samir Ghanem, Magda El-Khatib, Abdel Moneim Madbouly, Lebleba and Madiha Kamel. A villain role, was Hafez in The Guilty (1975). In 1977, Zulfikar starred in the miniseries; The Return of the Spirit, aired in the holy month of Ramadan in 1977 on Egyptian and Arab television networks, based on Tawfiq al-Hakim's 1933 novel under the same name, the miniseries was popular in Egypt and the Arab world, it is considered one of Zulfikar's most successful television works of his career.

=== 1980s: another career peak ===
Zulfikar's films, television films and series continued to be successful during the eighties. Due to major alteration in Egyptian cinema in the 1980s, he focused generally on television roles becoming selective in his film roles. In 1981, he starred in the dramatic television film; Secret Visit, in which Zulfikar portrayed Judge Ismail, earning him an award from the Ministry of Culture for best actor.

He shared the lead in; A Moment of Weakness (1981), alongside Hussein Fahmy and Nelly. Zulfikar portrayed a complex character and his performance was glowingly reviewed by critics and the film performed moderately in the box-office. In 1982, he shared the lead with Nour El-Sherif in the crime thriller; The Peacock directed by Kamal El Sheikh, and it garnered critical and financial success, earning him the state's award for best actor in a leading role for his performance and for the second time in a raw.

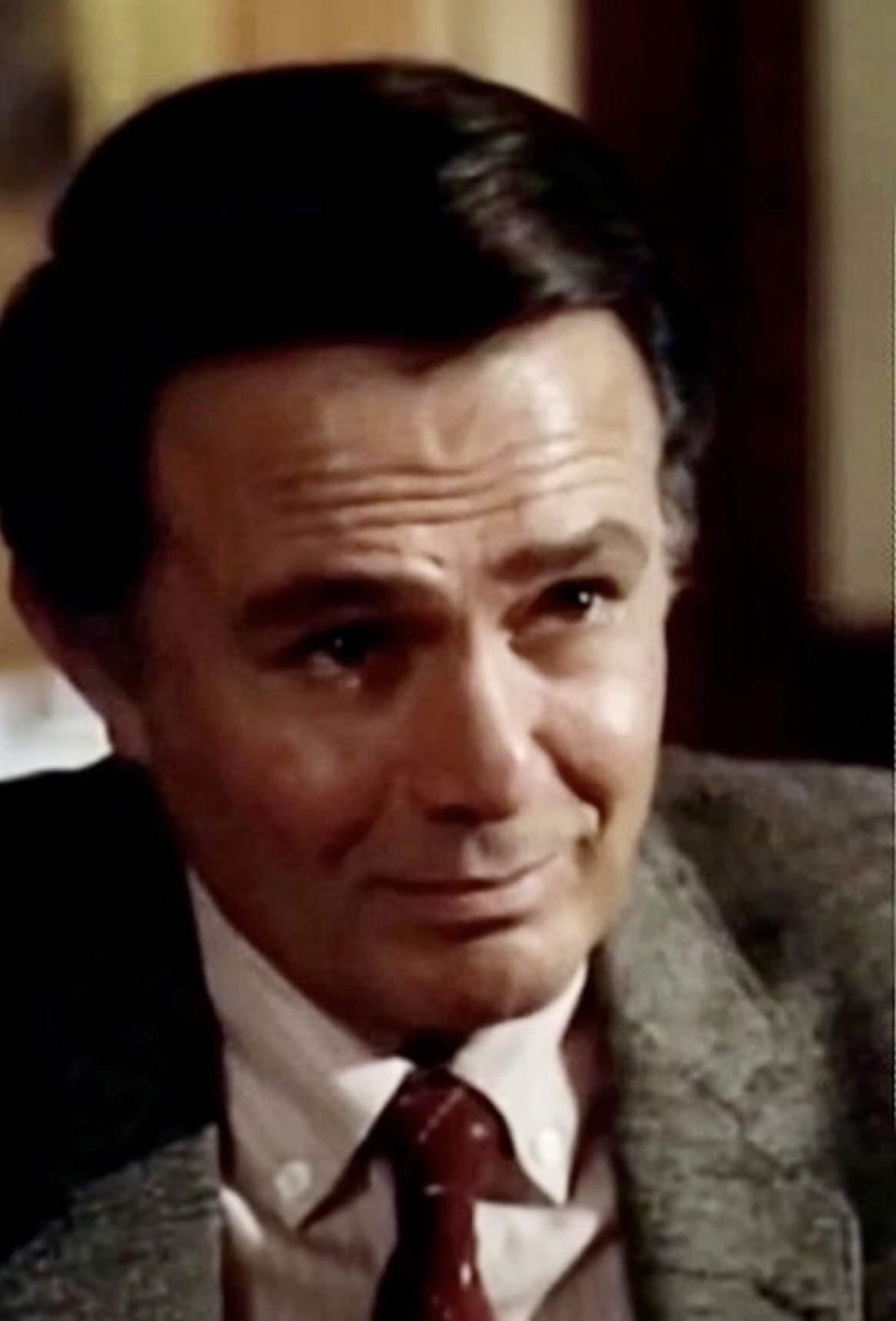
Zulfikar in The Peacock (1982), in which he won then Best Actor award in a leading role for his performance from the Ministry of Culture

After his two consecutive awards, Zulfikar turned down many scripts and spent three years hiatus from films, until returning in 1985 upon Youssef Chahine's insisting request, on his fifth venture with Chahine, he played a secondary role of the blind Cheikh Hassouna in Adieu Bonaparte and the film was recognized by French critics in Cannes Film Festival. Followed by a series of television films.

In 1988, Zulfikar, 62 at the time, lived a prosperous year in his career. He co-starred in four films and starred in two television films including, the popular socio-drama; Monsieur le Directeur (1988) with a supporting cast that includes Laila Taher, Mahmoud El-Gendy, Mustafa Metwalli, among others. He shared the lead in Saeed Marzouk's Days of Terror (1988), a crime thriller alongside Mervat Amin, Mahmoud Yassin and Zahret El-Ola.

=== 1990–1993: TV massive success and final roles ===
Zulfikar's career was revitalized by his cheerful, good-natured performance in The Family of Mr Shalash miniseries aired in Ramadan holy month in 1990, it was an Egyptian and pan-Arab success, the series which later became one of Egypt's television classics, is considered one of Zulfikar's most successful television works of his career. Following the success in television, Zulfikar was back to films in 1991, he starred in the crime thriller Wicked Game (1991) by Henry Barakat, the film was a commercial success.

He starred in several TV movies, his final television role was the lead in El-Awda El-Akhira, aired on Egyptian television for the first time in 1993. In the same year, he appeared in a special appearance as Admiral Fouad Mohamed Abou Zikry, the Commander-in-chief of the Egyptian Navy in the war drama television film Road to Eilat. He played the role of Dr. Abdelmoneim in The Terrorist by Nader Galal, which he could not continue filming. Zulfikar shared the lead in Ashraf Fahmy's Five-Star Thieves as Galal Suleiman, an honest bank director dealing with a major fraud. All three films were released posthumously in 1994.

== Film production career ==
=== 1958–1962: Ezz El-Dine Zulficar Films ===
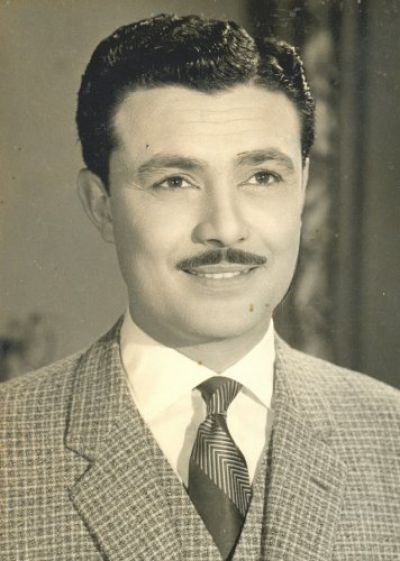
Zulfikar in the late 1950s

In 1958, Zulfikar and his brother Ezz El-Dine established a film production corporation under the trade name of Ezz El-Dine Zulficar Films Company. He took over the administrative side. Zulfikar's film production career prompted him to resign from his post as the executive director of the Afro-Asian People's Solidarity Organisation in 1962.

The Zulfikar brothers produced their first film; Among the Ruins (1959) in which his portrayal of Ahmed earned praise from critics. The film was directed by Ezz El-Dine Zulficar and was commercially and critically successful, and was listed later in the Top 100 Egyptian films. Zulfikar co-produced and starred in the box office hit; The Second Man (1959) of Ezz El-Dine Zulficar, featuring Salah Zulfikar in two roles alongside Rushdy Abaza, Samia Gamal and Sabah. In 1960, they produced Malaak wa Shaytan starring Rushdy Abaza and directed by Kamal El Sheikh. The film was another breakthrough to Rushdy Abaza after his success in The Second Man. Followed by The Holy Bond (1960) starring Sabah, Salah Zulfikar, Emad Hamdy, and directed by his older brother Mahmoud Zulfikar, the film later became an Egyptian cinematic classic. Their next venture was Tewfik Saleh's Struggle of the Heroes (1962), which was later listed in the Top 100 Egyptian films.

=== 1962–1975: Salah Zulfikar Films ===
In 1962, he established Salah Zulfikar Films Company, his own corporation, to produce feature films. Their goal was to focus on film sales, but as the founder stated in a 1969 television interview, aired on Channel 1 of the Egyptian television:

"I am a professional cinematic actor, however, I consider film production as my hobby, I produce only what I believe".

Salah Zulfikar Films produced three films in the first year of operations. The newly born company's first venture was Ezz El-Dine Zulficar's A Date at the Tower (1962) including Salah Zulfikar and Soad Hosny and Fouad el-Mohandes in the leading roles. His next venture was Niazi Mostafa's I am the fugitive (1962) starring Farid Shawqi, followed by Letter from an Unknown Woman (1962) of Salah Abu Seif, starring Lobna Abdel Aziz and Farid al-Atrash. All of which achieved box office success.

As a producer, Zulfikar took his social responsibilities very seriously. Shey min El Khouf, (A Taste of Fear, 1969) by Hussein Kamal, tackled democracy and Oridu hallan (I Want a Solution, 1975) by Said Marzouk examined women's right to divorce and were benchmarks in Egyptian cinema and earned Zulfikar numerous national awards. Amira Noshokaty in Al-Ahram

Four years later, Salah Zulfikar Films produced the 1966 film; My Wife, the Director General directed by Fatin Abdel Wahab. The film did justice to the main female character and allowed her to be a director over men. The film was a commercial and critical success for Zulfikar as an actor and producer, and turned out to be a cinematic classic. He won the Egypt's best film producer award for 1966. The film won the best film award from the Egyptian Catholic Center for Cinema, and was later listed in the Top 100 Egyptian films. Another 1966 box-office hit was Zulfikar's Three Thieves, the film tells three separate stories of three thieves waiting for a ruling from the judge, a role that was played by Yehia Chahine. Each story is describing the reasons why every character turned out to be a thief. And the three stories were written by Ihsan Abdel Quddous, and directed by three different filmmakers; "Sareq Al Dahab" by Fatin Abdel Wahab, "Sareq Al-Autobus" by Hassan El-Imam, and "Sareq Ameto" by Kamal El Sheikh. Zulfikar starred in a "Sareq Al Dahab" alongside Hind Rostom. In 1969, Salah Zulfikar Films produced A Taste of Fear starring Shadia and directed by Hussein Kamal, and it caused an uproar in Egypt at the time. The film was banned at first. But when Zulfikar took the film and watched it with the President Gamal Abdel Nasser, who watched the film for another time, he finally allowed its release in theatres. The award-winning film achieved financial and critical success in Egypt and the Middle East and was later listed in the Top 100 Egyptian films.

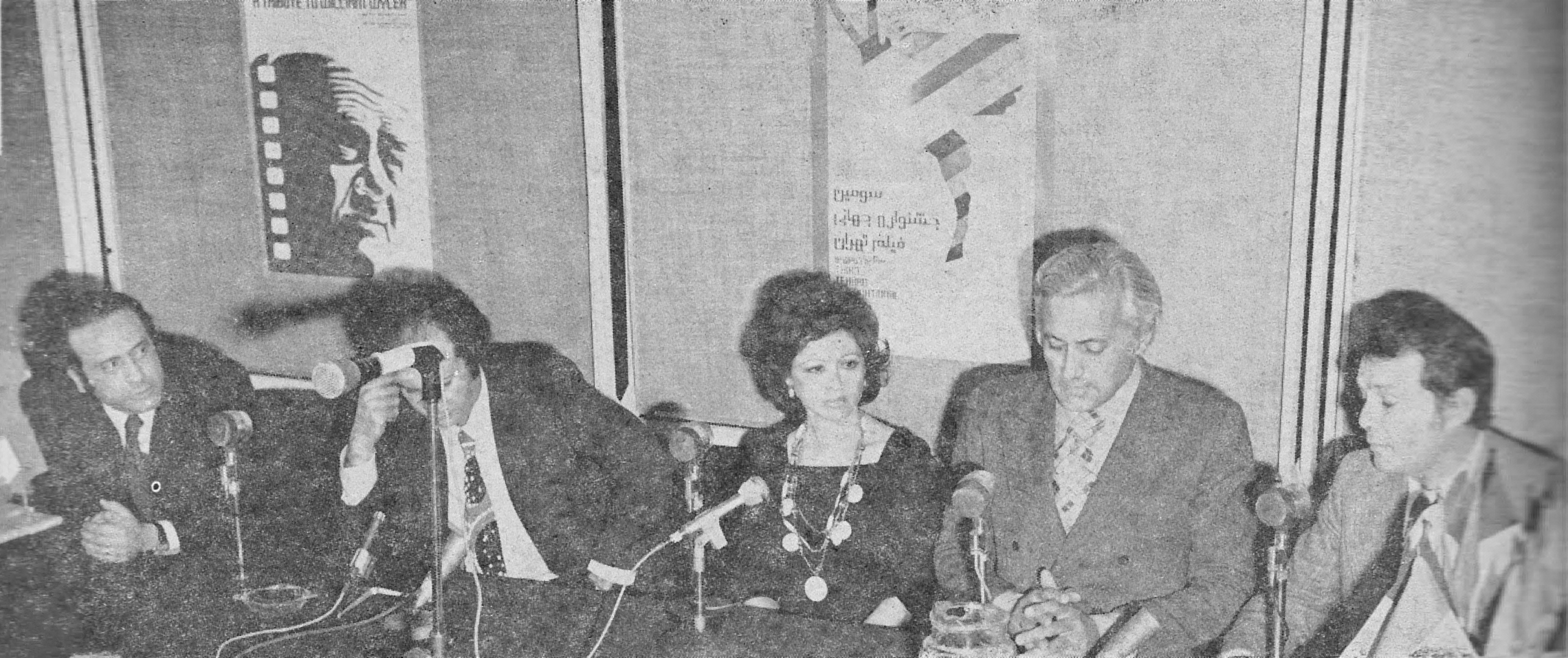
Zulfikar attending an I Want a Solution (1975) press conference for the third Tehran International Film Festival. From right to left: Zulfikar, Manuchehr Anwar, Faten Hamama, Said Mazrouk, and an Egyptian translator, 1974.

He worked as executive producer for The Other Man (1973), in which he also took the leading role. With an ensemble cast that includes Shams El-Baroudi, Zubaida Tharwat, Kamal el-Shennawi, and Emad Hamdy, the film was financially successful. Salah Zulfikar Films Company's final venture was I Want a Solution (1975) starring Faten Hamama and co-starring Rushdy Abaza. It was discussing the women's rights in divorce. The film achieved box office and critical success and contributed substantially in changing the personal status law in Egypt related to procedures in family courts, women's right to unilateral divorce and the establishment of a new family courts law in favor of women. It was Zulfikar's last film production and he won the state award for best producer for the second time, and later, this film was listed in the Top 100 films in the centenary of Egyptian cinema.

== Death ==
Salah Zulfikar died of a sudden heart attack on Wednesday, 22 December 1993, at the Police Hospital in Cairo. His funeral ceremony was solemnly held from the Umar Makram Mosque in Tahrir Square in the presence of thousands, and he was buried in the Zulfikar family cemetery in the Imam al-Shafi’i area in Cairo.

== Acting style ==
In 1965, Aghla Min Hayati critical reviews, Galil El-Bandary, wrote, "I could not have imagined that Salah Zulfikar could make me cry and make tears pour out of my eyes like hot water! Convincing, and he had found his role, which he kept dreaming of and happened!". Another 1965 Egyptian film critic reviewed in Al-Ghad newspaper on Aghla Min Hayati : "Salah Zulfikar played a character of a man in three different age stages in a smooth manner." In 1976, in Al Kuwait newspaper critical review: "He assured everyone that he's a camouflage actor who can play any kind of role." On his performance in I'm Not Lying But I'm Beautifying (1981), prominent film writer and critic Amir El-Amry reviewed: "Salah Zulfikar’s performance in the film reflects his experience, confidence, extreme spontaneity, and ability to persuade, he's real, perfectly natural."

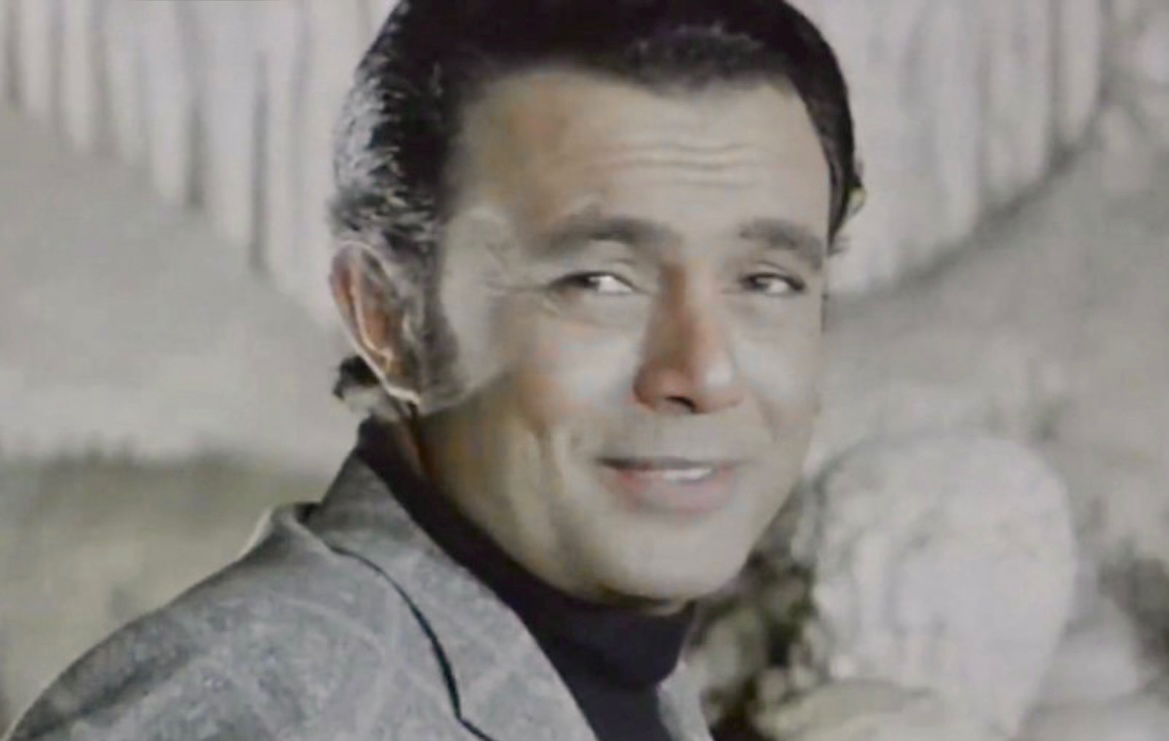
Zulfikar in 1972

Mahmoud Qassem wrote: "Salah Zulfikar explained the character running between lightness and movement through a very simple and attractive performance", a 1999 critical review on Zulfikar's role in The Second Man (1959). "A cool guy who hides behind his humor a great deal of seriousness, courage, and optimism, whether in life or death." 2009 Khaleej magazine critical review on Zulfikar's performance in Jamila, the Algerian (1958). Salah Zulfikar presented the character of Issa Al-Awam in a gentle and light manner that is likable and patriotic at the same time. Zulfikar is a handsome actor, exuding youth and vitality. Ashraf Tawfik reviewed on Zulfikar's performance in Saladin the Victorious (1963).

In 1975, Tharwat Abaza reviewed: "I cannot miss to congratulate Salah Zulfikar, for his top role, as well as a wonderful performance", on Zulfikar's performance in The Guilty (1975). Film critic Tarek El Shennawi stated: "Salah Zulfikar was able to prove that he is a genius and talented actor, he had multiple roles in drama, comedy and action, all of which he managed to master." interview aired on On E, 19 January 2021. "True talent never die, and the talent of Salah Zulfikar exploded with the most beautiful films, and he remained for the last day of his life working in film", Ahmed El-Samahi in Al-Ahram. "Zulfikar is significantly remembered for his role as a poor Arabic teacher who gradually introduces Mazhar to reality and responsibility." 2017 Egypt Today's critical review on Zulfikar's performance in Soft Hands (1963).

== Awards and honours ==
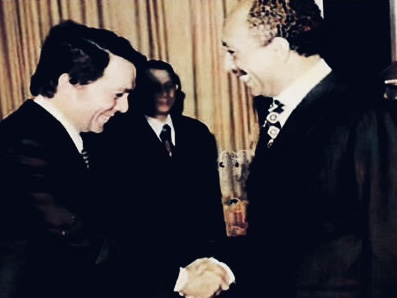
Zulfikar shaking hands with the Egyptian President Anwar Sadat in Cairo, 1976

=== Awards ===
Zulfikar received numerous awards through his thirty seven-year career including his first State Award from the Ministry of Culture for Best Actor in leading role for his performance in Soft Hands in 1963. He won the State Award for Best Actor in a leading role for his performance in Aghla Min Hayati in 1965. The next year, he won the State Award for Best Producer of the year for My Wife, the Director General (1966), which also received the Best Film Award from the Egyptian Catholic Center for Cinema Festival. He won the State Award for Best Actor in a leading role for his performance in My Wife's Dignity in 1967.

In 1975, He won State Award for Best Producer of the year for I Want a Solution. Zulfikar received an honorary Certificate of Appreciation from President Anwar El-Sadat on Art Day in 1979. In 1981 and after fourteen years from his last state's award as an actor, he won the State Award for Best Actor in a leading role for his performance in Secret Visit. Next year, he won the state award of Best Actor for his performance in a leading role for his performance in The Peacock (1982) for the second consecutive time. Later, in 1991, he received the Special Jury Award from Cairo International Film Festival. Zulfikar posthumously received the Honorary Award for his life's work from the National Egyptian Film Festival in 1994.

=== Honours ===
Country	Honour
Egypt	Order of the Republic (Grand Cordon)
Egypt	Order of Sciences and Arts (1st class)
Egypt	Medal of Military Duty (1st class)

== Legacy ==
Zulfikar's enduring status as an iconic Egyptian was formally recognized by Egypt's government in the form of two of the highest civilian decorations and one military decoration. He was one of Egypt's heroes in its battle against the occupation while serving in the police. Ahmed Zulfikar spoke about his father in a 1994 press release:

"He participated in the guerrilla war of Ismailia against the British in 1944, and his patriotism was without limits. Afterwards, Zulfikar volunteered in the Battle of Ismailia of 1952, and in the 1956 Suez War. He was awarded the medal of military duty first class from Egyptian President Gamal Abdel Nasser in appreciation for his efforts in serving his country."

Zulfikar was a professor in Police Academy. In the Cairo Citadel, a big photo of Salah Zulfikar and his colleagues stands in the police museum, in honor of the heroes of the 1952 battle of Ismailia against the British. This battle's day is celebrated as the National police day on 25 January from every year.

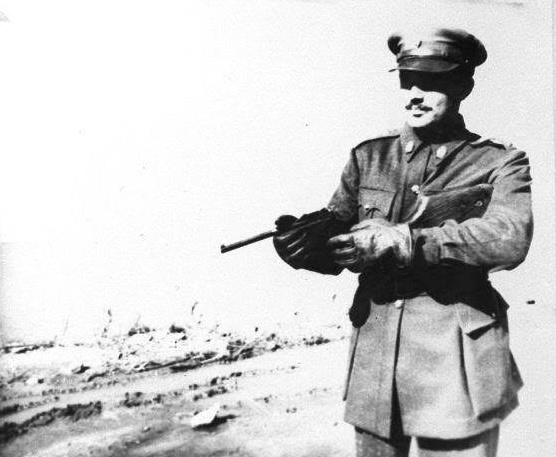
Zulfikar in the battle of Ismailia, January 1952

Zulfikar was regarded by colleagues in Egyptian cinema for his discipline and professionalism. His success as both an actor and a film producer earned him the nickname "The Genius". Actress Laila Taher, a longtime friend who co-starred with him in film, television, and theatre, described him as "a gentleman" who treated his colleagues "as if they're family." Salah Zulfikar spoke on Egyptian youth in an Egyptian Television interview in 1985:

"I have a hope in the future, we (Egypt) have 30 million young men out of 50 million (Egypt's population in 1985). Reward and punishment is the sun that can enlighten our way. With justice, only true and honest Egyptian young men can be capable of interpreting their duty to our homeland."

He is a cultural icon with enduring popularity. His rise to national attention in the 1960s had a profound effect on Egyptian culture. His collaborations to social issues earned him prominence throughout the Arab world. Zulfikar was also considered a male sex symbol. Egyptian actress Bushra stated: "Salah Zulfikar [was] my fairy tale "knight of dreams" (a title he owned from the 1960s)." He appeared opposite many of the most popular actresses of their time. Mariam Fakhreddine was a favorite actress of his to work with, and he partnered with her in thirteen films. He starred with Nelly in seven features. Shadia and Sabah worked with him six times, and he was paired with Soad Hosny in five productions. Nadia Lutfi, Huda Sultan and Mervat Amin worked with him four times. He also starred with each of Magda, Zubaida Tharwat and Hind Rostom in three productions, and he was paired twice with each of Faten Hamama and Naglaa Fathi.

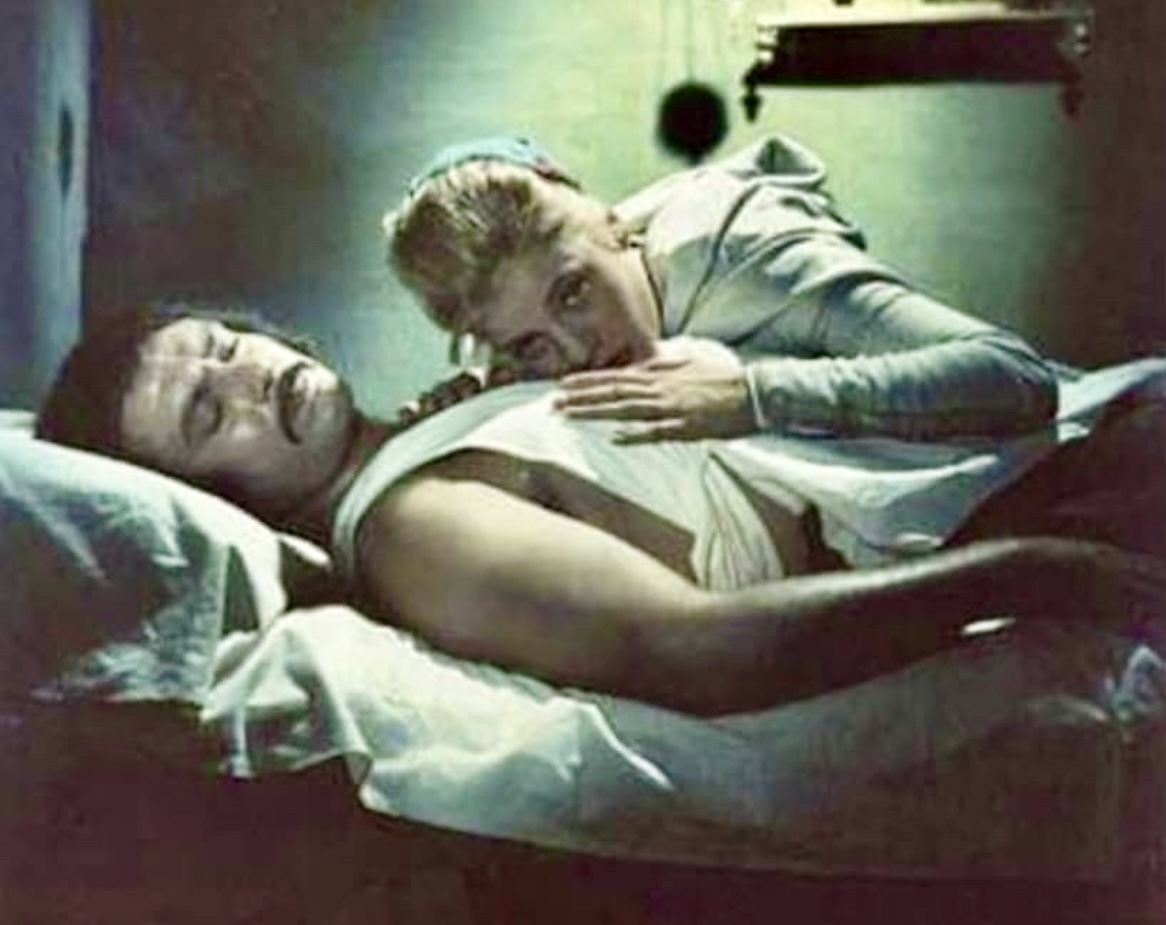
Zulfikar and Nadia Lutfi in Saladin the Victorious, 1963

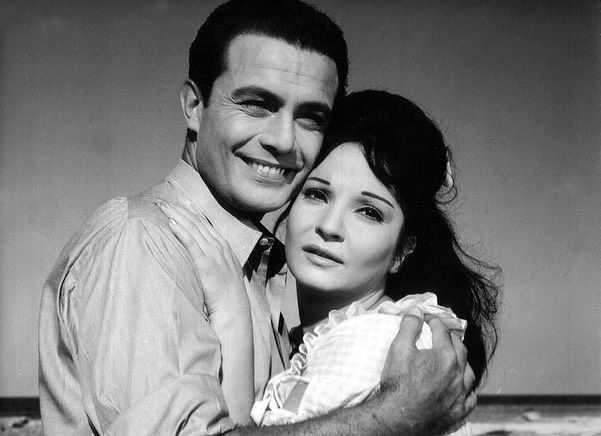
Zulfikar and Shadia in Aghla Min Hayati, 1965

Zulfikar was one of the most consistent box-office performers in Egyptian cinema, remaining a bankable star for over two decades. Hemmat Moustafa wrote in: Salah Zulfikar: a Journey into the life of a genius artist: "Salah Zulfikar, one of the most prominent cinematic artists of the twentieth century, who enriched Egyptian art as an actor and a producer with many masterpieces that made him remain in the memory of both the Egyptian and global cinema, and in the conscience and memory of the masses." Neama Shafik wrote in "Stars I Knew: Fifty Years with the People of Art": "Salah Zulfikar passed away at the age of 67, with 250 films, 70 television serials, and seven plays, Zulfikar was absent from us physically, but his works will remain before us as an expression of presence, not absence, may God rest his soul." Prior venturing into the acting world, he was a professor at the Police Academy. This added to Zulfikar's allure. His dreamy eyes, fit physique and good acting placed Zulfikar way up on the Hot List. Salah Zulfikar has always been a women's rights defender and expressed his belief through his films and has produced more than one film, doing justice for Egyptian women.

In Cairo, there are two streets named in honor of Salah Zulfikar, including one in Abbassia, the neighborhood where he was born, and one in New Cairo. Several celebrations took place in his name and he was awarded posthumously in several artistic events. In February 2022, Cairo Opera House invited Karim Zulfikar, a businessman, and the youngest grandson of Salah Zulfikar to be the speaker in a seminar titled "The Zulfikar brothers collaboration to cinematic history", attended by a large crowd celebrating their admiration to the legacy of the influential film star.

== Personal life ==
He was married four times. He married his first wife, the socialite Nafisa Bahgat, daughter of Mahmoud Bey Bahgat, in 1947. They had a son, Ahmed and a daughter, Mona, and she remained his wife until her death in 1988. His son Ahmed Zulfikar graduated as a mechanical engineer to become a businessman owning his own corporation and his daughter Mona Zulfikar graduated as a lawyer and became a prominent lawyer owning a law firm. Zulfikar had three grandchildren-Karim Zulfikar is a businessman, Salah Zulfikar is a corporate director and Ingy Badawy is a lawyer. Besides boxing, Salah Zulfikar was a football fan and used to play football with fellow actors from time to time. He supported Zamalek S.C.

Zulfikar's second marriage was to actress Zahret El-Ola in 1957, but they were divorced two years later. The love story that brought him together with the singer and actress Shadia was the most famous of all, and they were married while filming in 1964. Together, Zulfikar and Shadia formed an artistic duo through which they presented many successful films in Egyptian Cinema, and Zulfikar produced more than one film with Shadia in the leading role. Their marriage ended in divorce after seven years. Later, he married his last wife, Bahiga, and their marriage continued until his death in 1993.

== Filmography ==
Prolific in Egyptian film industry for 37 years. Salah Zulfikar was a film producer and film, stage, television, and radio actor. The award-winning actor appeared in feature films, short films, plays, television series, broadcast serials and paired with all the leading actresses of his generation. As a producer, Zulfikar produced fifteen films and achieved both financial and critical success in the majority of them. He accomplished a history of a total of a two hundred and fifty credits throughout his career leaving an extensive legacy.
