= Kamal El Sheikh =

Egyptian film director (1919–2004)

- كمال الشيخ
- Born: 2 February 1919; Egypt
- Died: 2 January 2004 (aged 84); Cairo, Egypt
- Occupation: Film director
- Years active: 1952–1987

Kamal El Sheikh (Arabic: كمال الشيخ; 2 February 1919 – 2 January 2004) was an Egyptian film director. He directed 28 films between 1952 and 1987, with eight of them in the Top 100 Egyptian films list. He was known in the fifties and early sixties as "Hitchcock of Egypt" because of his influence from the cinema of the well-known British director.

== Selected filmography ==
- Malak al-Rahma (1946 - editor)
- Fatma (1947 - editor)
- Al-Manzel Raqam 13 (1952)
- Life or Death (1954)
- Hob wa Dumoo` (1955)
- Ard al-Salam (1957)
- Sayyidat al-Qasr (1958)
- Hobbi al-Wahid (1960)
- Malaak wa Shaytan (1960)
- Lan Aataref (1961)
- Chased by the Dogs (1962)
- Last Night (1964)
- Three Thieves (Story 3) (1966)
- The Man who lost his Shadow (1968)
- Sunset and Sunrise (1970)
- Whom Should We Shoot? (1975)
- The Peacock (1982)
