= List of Egyptian films of 1983 =

A list of films produced in Egypt in 1983. For an A-Z list of films currently on Wikipedia, see Category:Egyptian films.

Title	Director	Cast	Genre	Notes
Al-Ghoul (The Ghoul)	Samir Seif	Adel Emam, Nelly, Farid Shawki	Crime	
Al-Motasawel (The Beggar)	Ahmed El-Sabaawi	Adel Emam, Isaad Younis	Comedy / crime	
Antar Shayel Saifoh (Antar is Holding His Sword)	Ahmed El-Sabaawi	Adel Emam, Noura	Comedy	
Ayoub		Omar Sharif		
El Harrif (The Street Player)	Mohamed Khan	Adel Emam, Firdaus Abdul Hamid	Drama	Entered into the 13th Moscow International Film Festival
Hob Fi El-Zinzana (Love in Prison Cell)	Mohamed Fadel	Soad Hosny, Adel Emam, Gamil Ratib	Romance / drama	
Khamsa Bab (Five Doors)	Nader Galal	Adel Emam, Nadia El Guindy, Fouad el-Mohandes	Comedy / drama	
Wala Men Shaf Wala Min Derey (Unseen and Unknown)	Nader Galal	Adel Emam, Ma'ali Zayed, Eman	Comedy / drama	
