= List of Egyptian films of 1994 =

A list of films produced in Egypt in 1994. For an A-Z list of films currently on Wikipedia, see Category:Egyptian films.

Title	Director	Cast	Genre	Notes
Al Tareeq Ele Eilat (Road to Eilat)	Inaam Mohamed Ali	Salah Zulfikar, Ezzat El Alaili,	War	
Losoos Khamas Nogoom (Five-Star Thieves)	Ashraf Fahmy	Salah Zulfikar, Dalal Abdel Aziz	Suspense	
Al-Irhabi (The Terrorist)	Nader Galal	Adel Emam, Salah Zulfikar, Madiha Yousri	Political / Drama	
Al-Mohager (The Emigrant)	Youssef Chahine	Khaled El Nabawy, Hanan Tork, Youssra	Drama	
