= Mohamed Salah Christmas photos =

Social media tradition of footballer Mohamed Salah

The Mohamed Salah Christmas photos are a series of annual Christmas-themed family photographs posted by Egyptian footballer Mohamed Salah on social media since 2019, which have generated recurring controversy. The practicing Muslim, who played for Liverpool from 2017 to 2026, usually shares photos of himself, his wife, and their two daughters beside a decorated Christmas tree.

The posts, shared with his tens of millions of social media followers, have prompted a recurring mixture of criticism from some Muslim fans who consider the celebration inconsistent with Islamic teaching, and support from others who describe it as a gesture of religious tolerance and goodwill towards the country in which he resides. The tradition is also linked to a fan superstition, sometimes called the "Christmas curse", which holds that Salah's or Liverpool's on-field form worsens after the picture is posted.

== Social media posts ==
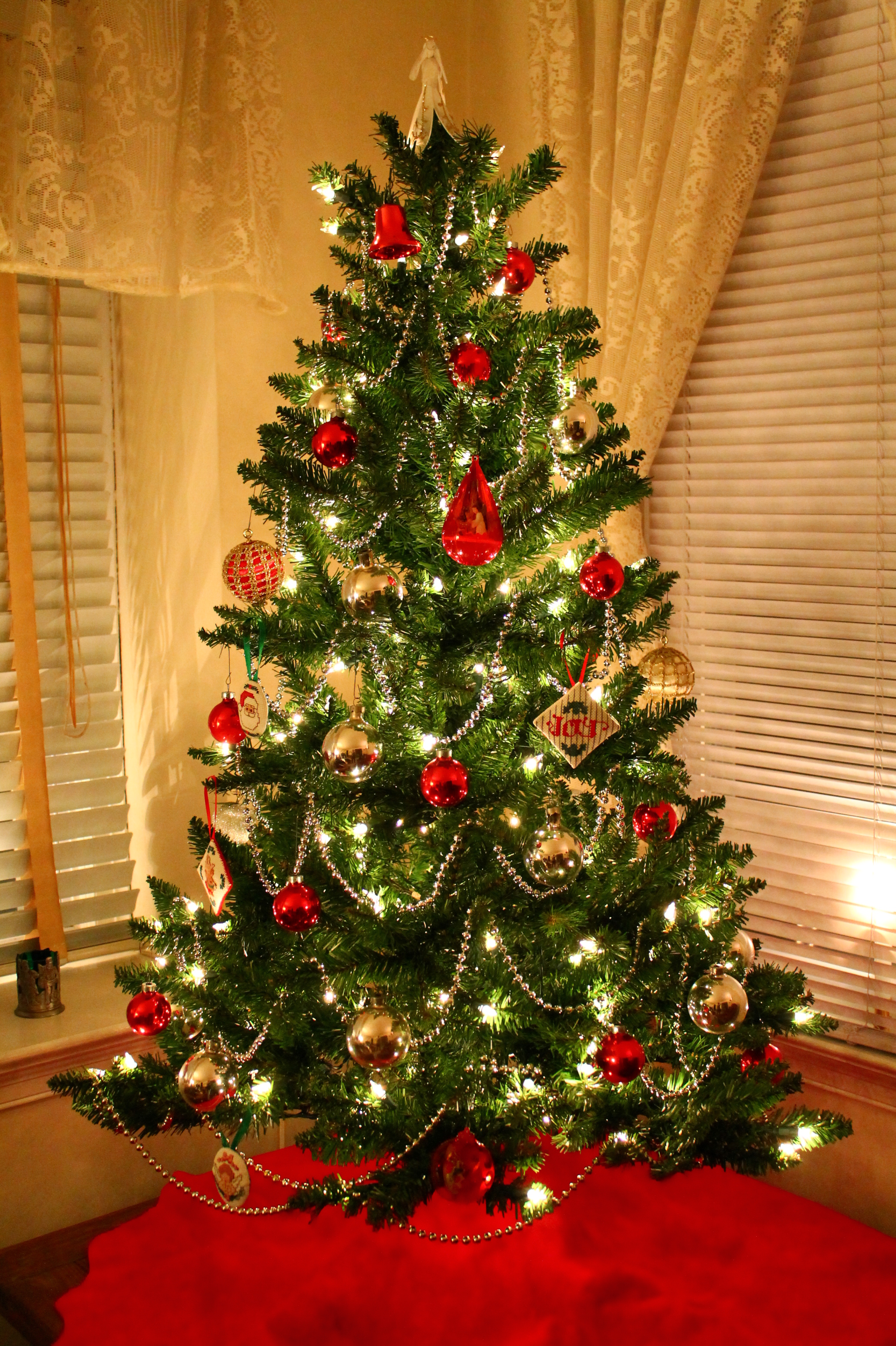
Christmas is a holiday which comes from Christianity. although many of its popular elements such as Christmas trees have secular origins.

Salah shared his first Christmas family photo in December 2019 and repeated it in 2020, establishing what later became a yearly custom. The 2019 post drew more than 24,000 comments on Instagram, where many users praised it as a sign of tolerance, while others said the celebration was religiously forbidden.

In December 2021, ahead of that year's Christmas photo, Salah drew separate criticism when he told the Egyptian talk-show host Amr Adib that he did not drink alcohol because he had no desire to so, rather than clearly citing the Islamic prohibition on alcohol. Egypt's Dar al-Ifta, the country's main Islamic advisory body, responded with public statements stressing that alcohol is forbidden. Adib went on to defend Salah's Christmas photo in his programme El Hekaya, saying the footballer was simply "spending time with his children in front of a Christmas tree". Al-Azhar professor Saad El-Din El-Hilali also stepped in to defend him. Commentators noted it was the third consecutive year the family picture had drawn criticism from fans who considered it inappropriate for a Muslim to take part in the customs of another faith.

Nevertheless, uploads continued each December of the following years, with the picture, usually showing Salah, his wife Magi Salah (née Sadeq) and daughters Makka and Kayan in matching pyjamas beside the tree, prompting a recurring mix of criticism and support. The December 2022 social media post became Salah's most-liked Instagram post of that year, with 3.7 million likes, but also his most-commented, drawing about 122,000 comments, well above the roughly 15,000 his posts typically received, with most of the additional comments critical. Critics argued the celebration was incompatible with Islam, with some saying they would stop supporting Salah or Liverpool over it, while others responded that taking part in the secular aspects of the holiday season did not make him a lesser Muslim.

In December 2023, some followers publicly urged Salah not to share a Christmas picture before that year's post had yet appeared. That same month, Liverpool's official social media accounts separately posted images of Salah and teammates, including Virgil van Dijk, Alisson and Trent Alexander-Arnold, spending Christmas Day with sick children at a Liverpool cancer hospital. The images drew criticism from users who contrasted the event for children with cancer with the worse situation for children in the Gaza Strip amid the war there which had begun months prior.

By December 2024, the picture, showing the family beside a tree and a large gingerbread figure and shared with Salah's 63.7 million Instagram followers, was liked by several Liverpool teammates and again drew a mixture of criticism and support, coming as Salah ranked first amongst the Premier League's top scorers that season.

In December 2025, while in Morocco with the Egypt national team for the Africa Cup of Nations, Salah shared a picture of his daughters beside a Christmas tree without appearing in it himself, again dividing opinion between critics who, on religious grounds, questioned the continued gesture even when Salah was unavailable, and supporters who praised it as a message of goodwill. Salah also shares a celebratory post each year marking the start of Ramadan, and when he did so in February 2026 some fans responded by asking "Where's the Christmas tree?".

== Curse theory ==
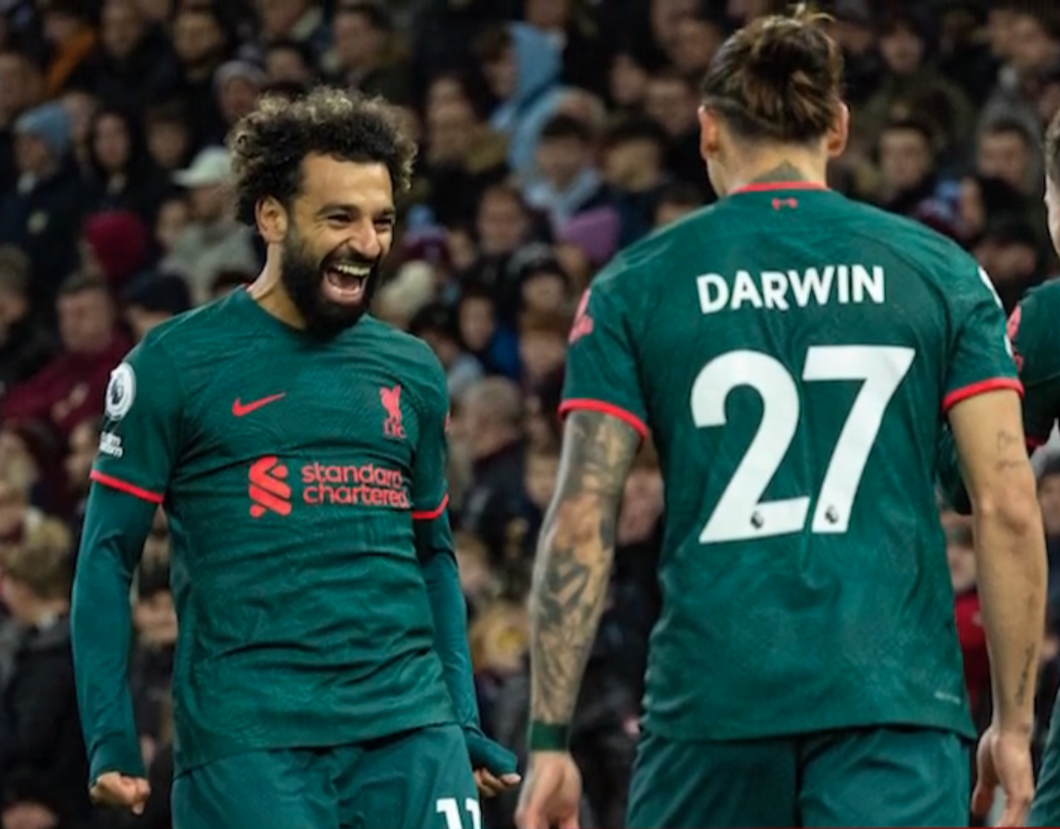
Salah after his quick goal against Aston Villa, "breaking the curse" according to some fans

Alongside the religious debate, some fans, particularly supporters of rival clubs and those wishing he would stop his tradition, have promoted a superstition holding that Salah's or Liverpool's form declines after the annual photograph is posted, an idea known as the "Christmas curse".

The idea was already circulating by December 2022, when Salah ended a brief goalless run by scoring within five minutes of Liverpool's first match after that year's post, this resulted in some fans describing the act as Salah "breaking the curse". It resurfaced with particular intensity in December 2024, when supporters of rival clubs such as Arsenal and Manchester City joked online that league-leading Liverpool's form would suffer following that year's photo.

Commentators have pointed out that past results do not support the theory, Salah posted the first such photograph on Christmas Day 2019, after which Liverpool went on to win the Premier League title that season, and the team beat Leicester City 3–1 in its first match after the 2024 photo.

== See also ==
- Sports-related curses
