= Al-Zaeem =

Satirical comedy Arabic play

Al-Zaeem الزعيم
- Original language: Arabic
- Written by: Farouk Sabry
- Genre: Political satire

Premiere
- Date: 1993
- Place: Egypt
- Directed by: Sherif Arafa

Al-Zaeem (Arabic: الزعيم, lit. 'The Boss') is a political satirical play consisting of nine scenes. Written by Farouq Sabri and starring Adel Emam, the play was produced by the **Arabian Company for Media Production - Riyadh** and first performed in 1993.

The story follows Zeinhom, a simple man unable to hold a job for long because of his uncanny resemblance to his country's dictator, Al-Zaeem. When he lands a role as an extra in a foreign-funded movie, his resemblance leads to serious consequences. The play heavily satirizes post-modern authoritarian rulers in the Arab world. Due to its controversial nature, it was banned in several countries, including Tunisia and Libya.

== Plot ==
=== Characters ===
- Adel Emam: Plays both the President of the Republic and his lookalike, Zeinhom.
- Ahmed Rateb: Portrays Rustom, the Vice President of the Republic.
- Youssef Dawoud: Takes on the role of Zimbabwean, the Secretary to the Vice President.
- Mustafa Metwalli: Appears as Naeem, the Director General of Intelligence.
- Ragaa Al Geddawy: Plays Sonia, responsible for the private relations of the President.
- Manal Salama: Portrays Qamar, the Secretariat of the President's Office.

=== Summary ===
The play is set in an unnamed Arab dictatorship. Zeinhom, a cinema extra who resembles the ruler, acts in a minor role as a thief. However, he is noticed by senior officials as reports circulate that the real ruler is near death. The inner circle, seeking to preserve their control and fear of a power vacuum, recruit Zeinhom to act as the leader's double.

When the dictator dies before he can order Zeinhom's arrest, the regime officials install Zeinhom as a compliant figurehead. Suddenly moved from a life of precarious employment to the presidential palace, Zeinhom is drawn into court rivalries and manipulation. Though his aims remain modest, the new position forces him to make high-stakes decisions under constant threat to his safety. He doubts his ability to govern a country in turmoil, trying to satisfy rival power centers and calm a wary public while avoiding reprisals or exposure.

== Background and controversy ==
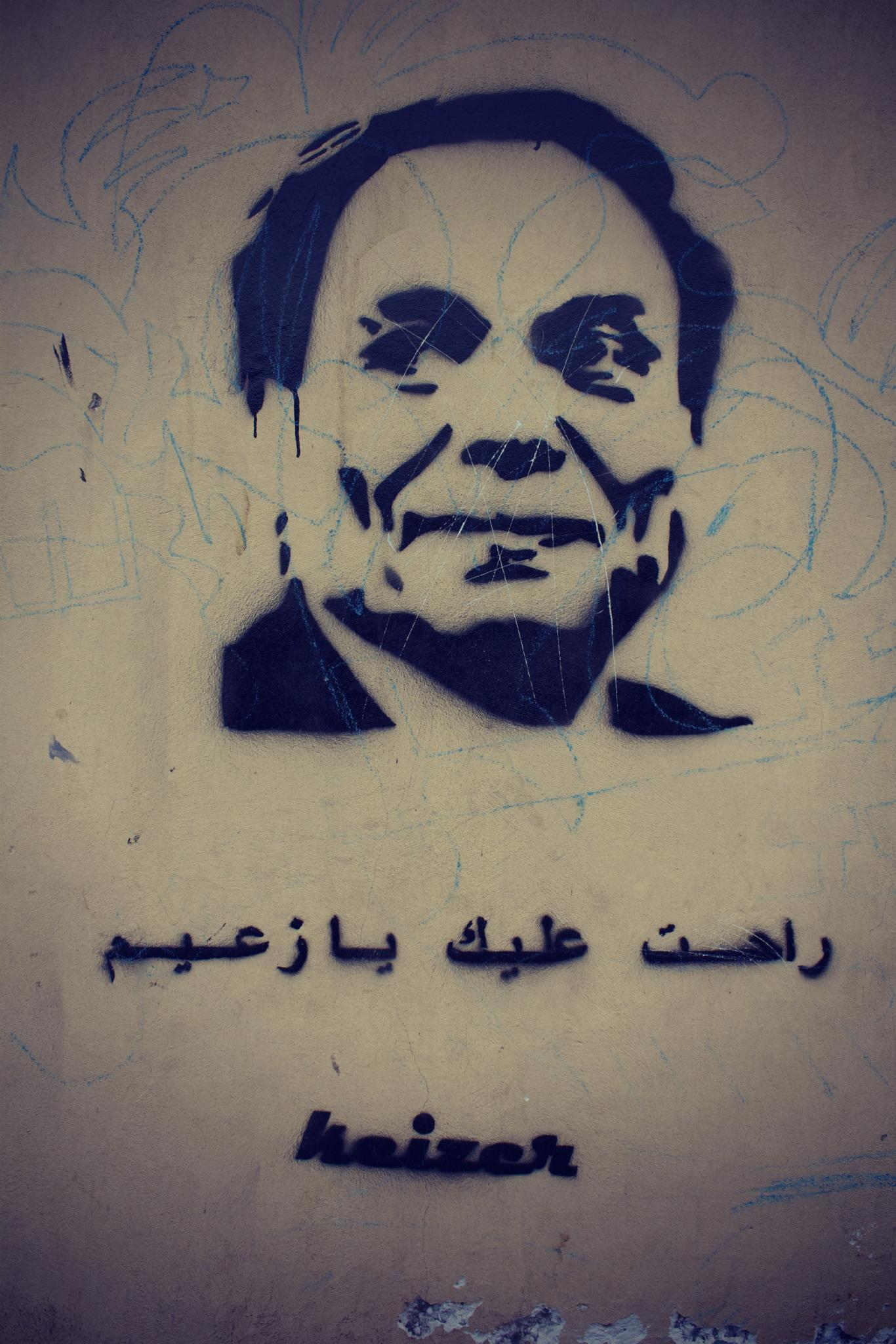
Adel Emam described on a wall as the leader (Arabic: الزعيم) during the 2011 Egyptian revolution. He did not support the revolution at that time, that's why it is written "Your time is gone, Zaeem" (Arabic: راحت عليك يا زعيم), a sentiment of disillusionment or disapproval towards him as a symbol of authority.

The play ran from 1993 to 1999 and garnered praise for its daring critique of oppressive regimes, drawing inspiration from Charlie Chaplin's film The Great Dictator. Its title became a common nickname for the lead actor, Adel Emam, who became known as "The Leader" (Arabic: الزعيم).

There were reportedly attempts by former Libyan president Muammar Gaddafi to assassinate Adel Emam, as the actor imitated Gaddafi in a sarcastic manner during the play's opening scenes. Consequently, authorities in some Arab countries banned the sale of recordings (tapes and CDs) of the production.

== Production ==
The play was produced by the **Arabian Company for Media Production - Riyadh**, a major media entity in the region. This high-value production allowed for the play to be filmed and distributed widely across the Arab world, cementing its status as a classic of Egyptian theater despite the censorship attempts.
