= Nicole Saba =

Lebanese singer and actress

Nicole Saba نيكول سابا
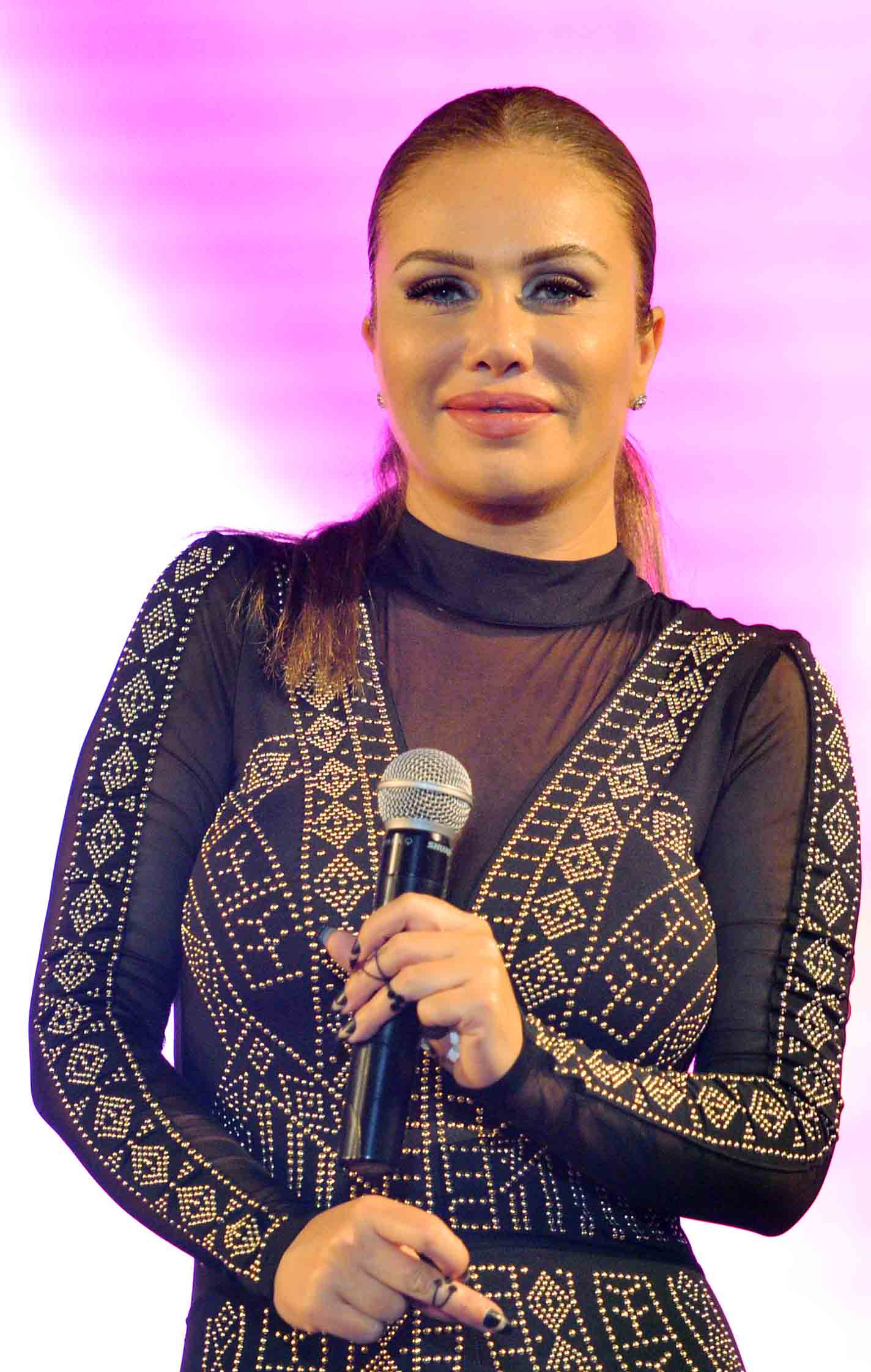
- Saba during her concert at Delta University, October 2016

Background information
- Born: 18
- Origin: Beirut, Lebanon
- Genres: Arabic pop music, Arabic music, pop
- Occupations: Singer, actress
- Spouse: Youssef Al Khal (m. 2011)

Nicole Saba (Arabic: نيكول سابا; born 26 June 1974) is a Lebanese actress and singer. She is active in Egyptian cinema, appearing in several Egyptian films.

== Career ==
From 1998 to 2001, Saba was a member of the Lebanese pop group The 4 Cats, replacing Rola Bahnam. Saba released two albums with the 4 Cats (Tic – Tick and Layl Nhar) and shot four video clips with them ("Yanassini", "Kan Ezaman", "Layl Nhar" and "Maba2a Eida"), as well as a commercial for LUX Shower Gel.

Saba then embarked on a solo singing and acting career. Her debut album was released in 2004, and her first film came out in 2003. She has subsequently taken further roles in Egyptian films.

She won the award for the best singer in 2004 from Sayidaty magazine.

In 2014, Saba won the North Vision Song Contest, representing Lebanon with her song "Hafdal Ahlam".

== Personal life ==
Saba married Lebanese actor Youssef El Khal on 24 December 2011 in Em Sherif Restaurant in Achrafieh, Beirut, after being in a relationship for 10 years. Their daughter Nicole El Khal was born in 2013.

== Filmography ==
- 2003: El Tagroba Al Denemarkeya (The Danish Experience) was Nicole's first acting experience. Saba was chosen for the role by the Egyptian actor Adel Emam.
- 2006: Tomn Dastet Ashrar - "Lily"
- 2006: Kesit el Hai El Sha'abi (Arabic: قصة الحي الشعبي) (The Story of the Common Neighborhood) Saba's first major lead role.
- 2008: The BabyDoll Night (Leilet El-Baby Doll) (Arabic: ليلة البيبي دول)
- 2008: Special Missions (Amaleyat Khasaa) (Arabic: عمليات خاصة)
- 2009: Al-Saffah (The Criminal or The Serial Killer) (Arabic: السفاح)
- 2012: Baba (film) (Baba) (Arabic: بابا)
- 2013: Samir Abou Alneil, (Samir the father of the Nile) (film) (Sameer Abool Neeel) (Arabic: سمير ابو النيل)

== Discography ==
- Album: Ya Shaghilny (2004, Alam El Phan)

=== Ya Shaghilny (2004) ===
- "Baly Beek Mashghoul" ("My Mind Is Thinking Of You")
- " Ya Shaghilny Beek" ("Keeping Me Busy With You")
- "Ana Ma Bahibak" ("I Don't Love You")
- "Fadel Sawany" ("Moments Left")
- "Wehliftlak Bilghaly" ("Swore with the Beloved")
- "Ash'aak" ("Adore You")
- "Law Fil Omr Lila" ("If There's was a Night in Life time")
- "Kol Lahzit Hob" ("Every Moment of Love")
- "Khalik Makanak" ("Stay Where You Are")
- "Albak Mosh Ala Had" ("Your heart Doesn't care about anyone")

=== Singles (2005–2018) ===
- "Bahebak Awi" ("Love you so much")
- "3amel 3amla" ("Up to something")
- "Tab3i Keda" ("This is my Character")
- "Brahti" ("As I Like")
- "Fares Ahlami" ("My Prince Charming")
- "Kont Fe Hali" ("I was By myself")
- "Hafdal Ahlam ("Keep on Dreaming")
- "Mafeesh Mosta7eel" ft. Abdelbaset Hamouda ("Nothing is Impossible")
- "Maba Tede2eli" ("Don't Call me Again")
- "Karart" ("I Decided")
- "Mesh Waat Kalam" ("No time for Talking")
- "Soura Selfie" ("Selfie Picture")
