= Dalia El Behery =

Egyptian actress

- داليا البحيري
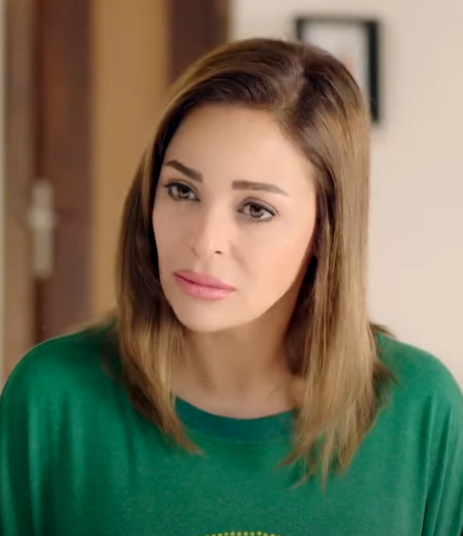
- El Behery in 2015
- Born: Dalia Mahmoud Quotb El Behery; October 15, 1970 (age 55); Tanta, Gharbia, Egypt
- Other name: MISS UNIVERSE
- Education: Helwan University
- Occupations: Actress, model, television host
- Years active: 1990–present

Dalia Mahmoud Quotb El Behery (Arabic: داليا محمود قطب البحيري; born October 15, 1970) is an Egyptian actress and beauty pageant titleholder. She won the Miss Egypt 1990 and represented her country at Miss Universe 1990 pageant in Los Angeles where she unplaced.

== Biography ==
El Behery received a bachelor's degree from the Faculty of Tourism and Hotels at Helwan University, and worked in prelude programs on the Egyptian Satellite Channel and modeling. Her first notable appearance was in a video clip of the song "Tegeesh Naeesh", by Ali El Haggar. Her modeling career paved the road for her acting profession. She has worked with stars such as Adel Imam in his film Al Safara fe Al Emara along with other comedians and singers including Hany Ramzy, Moustafa Amar and Khaled Selim.

El Behery said in one of her television interviews that she wishes to embody the role of pharaonic Queen "Nefertiti" on the screen, denying rumors that she was reluctant about the portrayal of the Queen "Cleopatra" by the Syrian actress Solaf Fawakhirji.

From an earlier marriage she had her first daughter khadija who died less than a year old then between 2008 to 2013, she was married to the businessman Farid El Mourchedi (known as Fred Morse), the grandson of artist Farid Shawki from his daughter the producer Nahed Farid Shawki. Dalia and Farid have a daughter named Kesmat (Kimi). In 2016, El Behery married Hassan Samy.

El Behery signed on as a Goodwill Ambassador for World Stroke Day in November 2010.

== Political views ==
In a telephone conversation with the channel "Al Arabiya", she expressed her happiness with the peaceful Egyptian Revolution of 2011 and the demands for basic rights like freedom, political reform, and a joint effort for nation building. In the meantime, Dalia said the absence of security made her feel worried, like the rest of the population. The worry, she explained, has been getting constantly worse after hundreds of prisoners fled the prison of Al Faiyum. She added that the youth revolt had ignited in the Egyptian streets and she thanked her fellow Egyptians who united to guard public property, especially the Egyptian Museum.

== Selected filmography ==
Films
No.	Year	Title
1	2002	Mohami khulaa
2	2003	El Banat (TV miniseries)
3	2004	Sana oula nasb
4	2004	Kan yom hobak
5	2004	Kalbi younadiek
6	2005	Harim Karim
7	2005	Al Bahethat
8	2005	El-Sefara fi El-Omara
10	2006	Al Ghawas
11	2007	Juba
9	2007	Ahlam Hakikiya

Preceded by Sally Atta	Miss Egypt; Miss Egypt 1990	Succeeded by Lamia El Noshy
