= Immortal Song =

Immortal Song may refer to:

- Immortal Song (film), a 1952 Egyptian film
- Immortal Songs, a South Korean television music competition
- Immortal Songs: Singing the Legend, a South Korean television music competition
