= The Baby Doll Night =

2008 Egyptian political comedy-drama film

- Directed by: Adel Adeeb
- Written by: Abdel-Hay Adeeb
- Starring: Mahmoud Abdel Aziz; Nour El-Sherif; Jamal Suliman; Gamil Ratib; Sulaf Fawakherji; Laila Olwi; Ghada Abdel Razek; Nicole Saba; Mahmoud Hemida
- Edited by: Mona Rabeei
- Music by: Yasser Abdel Rahman
- Distributed by: Good News Group
- Release date: 4 June 2008
- Running time: 180 minutes
- Country: Egypt
- Language: Egyptian Arabic
- Budget: 44,000,000 Egyptian Pounds

The Baby Doll Night (Arabic: ليلة البيبي دول, translit. Leilet El-Baby Doll) is a 2008 Egyptian political comedy-drama film by Adel Adeeb. The film encountered controversy for its high production cost, poor box office performance and controversial plot.

== Plot ==
As the film progresses, Awadein realizes that Srg. Peter was the prison warden at Abu Ghraib and that he is also staying at the hotel that he intends to bomb. Events reach a climax when Shoukry betrays Awadein upon realizing that the bombing of the hotel is a futile act that will only result in the murder of innocent people.

== Cast and crew ==
=== Main cast ===
Main cast of the film, as listed on its website.

Character	Actor/Actress
Houssam	Mahmoud Abdel Aziz
Awadein	Nour El-Sherif
Shoukry	Jamal Soliman
Sergeant Peter	Gamil Rateb
Sameeha	Sulaf Fawakherji
Sarah	Laila Olwi
Rachel	Ghada Abdel Razek
Thoraya	Nicole Saba
Mohsen A. Naga	Mahmoud Hemida
Mona	Arwa Gouda
Zaghloul	Ahmed Mekky
Rose	Dorra Zarrouk
Michael	Saaid Saddik
Kareema	Noura (EG)
Essam	Moustafa Hareedy
Azzmi	Ezzat Abou Ouf

=== Cameos ===
- Amr Adib
- Ola Ghanem
- Osama Mounir
- Mahmoud El-Guindy
- Ruby
- Mona Hala
