= Terrorism and Kebab =

- Directed by: Sherif Arafa
- Written by: Wahid Hamed
- Starring: Adel Emam
- Music by: Moody Elemam ( Elimam )
- Release date: 1992
- Running time: 105 minutes
- Country: Egypt
- Language: Arabic

Terrorism and Kebab (Arabic: الإرهاب و الكباب, transliterated: Al-irhab wal kabab) is a popular 1992 Egyptian black comedy film starring Adel Emam.

== Plot ==
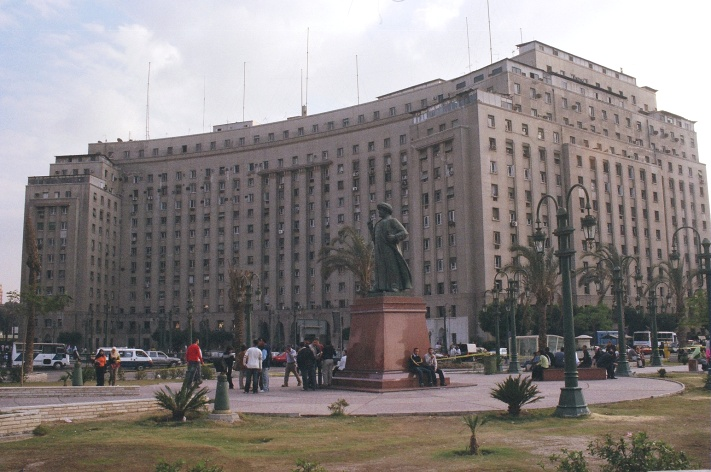
The Mogamma on Tahrir Square, Cairo, pictured in 2006

The action primarily takes place at the Mogamma in Cairo, a well-known mammoth-sized government building that is a center of bureaucratic work. Ahmed queues up at the Mogamma to try to get a school transfer for his children, but gets bogged down. Endless lines of citizens march through the building and up and down its iconic spiral staircases seeking help. One government worker frustrates Ahmed particularly, because he is constantly praying in a show of alleged piousness to avoid getting any work done. This leads to a scuffle between the two, and eventually Ahmed ends up with a rifle from a guard and shots are fired in the resulting confusion. A mass spontaneous evacuation of the building ensues, Ahmed inadvertently takes the building hostage, and subsequently is assumed to be a terrorist. He is joined in his "takeover" by a few other "misfits," including Shalabi, a shoe shiner, and Hind, a prostitute who escaped confinement during the confusion.

The police send a child with a Walkie-talkie so that he can communicate directly. Ahmed and his new compatriots negotiate with the Minister of Interior, and tell him that they will blow up the building using its supply of gas cylinders if their demands are not met. However, he does not know what his demands actually are.

Out of ideas, he demands kebab for all the hostages, as meat is too expensive for most Egyptians. The team struggles to find excuses to stall time as the police attempt to infiltrate the building.

As night falls, the police attempt to storm the building. An attempt by police to use a fire truck's ladder is thwarted by Ahmed using the building's fire hose against them. Upon seeing troops entering the ground floor, Hind and Shalabi fire warning shots at the ground floor and drop a gas cylinder on it, causing a large explosion. However, none of the troops are actually injured or killed, and they retreat.

Pressure mounts to come to a deal. Ahmed realizes that he has no demands, other than to be able to live a normal life for himself and his children. He asks his hostages what their demands are, and many recount personal stories of themselves being wronged by the system and government bureaucracy. From this they demand that the government's cabinet should resign.

This is quickly dismissed as heresy by the government ministers, ordering the news channels to report a deal has been reached, that Ahmed is a madman, and that the police will use any and all force needed to capture the building and return the government to work.

Ahmed orders the "hostages" to leave the building, and he will wait behind to meet up with the military police now ready to swarm the building, assuming he will be killed. The crowd, however, insists that he leave with them. Ahmed walks out unnoticed among his former "hostages", and the commandos find the building empty.

== Cast ==
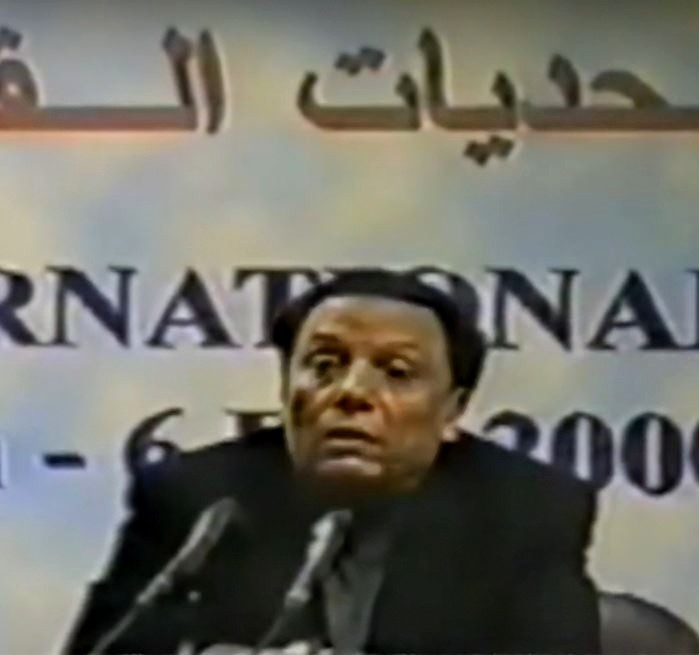
Emam in 2000

- Adel Emam as Ahmed
- Yousra as Hind
- Kamal el-Shennawi as Minister of Interior
- Ahmed Rateb as Shalabi

== Reception ==
The film has been described as a "classic Egyptian comedy about government corruption, bumbling and the good hearted nature of the sha'ab (people) of Egypt." The film was a great success, and has even been cited as the most popular Egyptian film of all time. A 2007 poll of Egyptian critics taken by Al-Ahram newspaper listed the film as No. 15 on the 15 best Egyptian films of all time.

Writer Wahid Hamed has described the symbolic meaning of the demand for kebab: "People don't know what they want ... They are crushed, their dreams are impossible, they can't believe their demands can be fulfilled, so they ask for kebab."
