= The Embassy in the Building =

- Directed by: Amr Arafa
- Starring: Adel Emam; Dalia El Behery
- Release date: 19 July 2005
- Country: Egypt
- Language: Arabic

The Embassy in the Building (Arabic: السفارة في العمارة) is a 2005 Egyptian comedy film directed by Amr Arafa.

== Cast ==
- Adel Emam - Sherif Khairy
- Dalia El Behery - Dalia
- Ahmed Rateb - Rateb
- Ahmed Siam -
- Lotfy Labib - David Cohen, the Israeli Ambassador
- Said Tarabeek - Hussian
- khaled ali - Hussian
