= Mustafa Metwalli =

Egyptian actor (1949–2000)

Mustafa Metwali
- Born: August 29, 1949; Biyala, Kafr Al Shiek, Egypt
- Died: August 5, 2000 (aged 50); Cairo, Egypt

Mustafa Metwalli (Arabic: مصطفى متولي; 29 August 1949 – 5 August 2000) was a popular Egyptian movie and stage actor. He was primarily a comedian, but he played many different roles in Drama.

== Personal life ==
He graduated in 1973 from the Institute of Theatrical Art which is for a long time the only higher education institution available to actors.

He died on August 5, 2000, as a result of a heart attack

His brother-in-law is actor Adel Emam.

== Filmography ==
- Watch Out for ZouZou
- Al-Karnak
- Antar Shayl Sefo
- Elosta El Modeer
- Sorry For Bothering
- Al Rakesa Wal Seyasy
- Gzert Al Shaytan
- Shams El Zanaty (as seberto)
- Al-La'ib Ma'a Al-Kibar
- El Wad Sayed Shaghal (play)
- El Mansy
- Al-Irhabi
- El Zaeem (play)
- Esh EL Ghorab
- Bikhit and Adila 1
- Bikhit and Adila 2
- Risala Ela Al-Wali
