= The Danish Experience =

2003 film by Ali Idrees

The Danish Experience abo boxer
- Directed by: Ali Idris
- Written by: Youssef Maaty
- Starring: Adel Emam; Nicole Saba
- Release date: August 6, 2003
- Country: Egypt
- Language: Arabic

The Danish Experience (or A Danish Experience/Experiment) (Al-Tagroba Al-Danemarkeya or El tagrubah el danemarkiyyah) (Arabic: التجربة الدنماركية) is a popular 2003 Egyptian comedy film starring Adel Emam and Nicole Saba.

== Plot ==
Adel Imam stars as Qadri, a widower and newly appointed government minister, whose four grown sons live with him. In her first acting gig, Lebanese singer Nicole Saba plays the buxom-blonde role of Danish student Aneta Henry Gothenburg, visiting Egypt for the first time to pursue her studies. She stays with Qadri and his family. Highlighting cultural differences in comedic fashion (among other things, free-spirited Aneta tries to teach Qadri's sons about sex, and intrudes on a government meeting dressed as a bellydancer), Qadri eventually falls for Aneta, but so do his sons. After a blowup, he finally chooses to stay with his sons.

== Reception ==
In January 2004, Asharq Al-Awsat reported that the film was the second-highest grossing Egyptian film of 2003, with revenue exceeding E£13 million, not counting foreign distribution. The film was considered to be an "enormous success." It was also the highest grossing film in Lebanon for the year.

The scanty clothing and sexually-open nature of Saba's character in an Arabic language film caused some criticism. Saba noted that the film shows the differences in two cultures, and "the entire film was daring, but at the same time respectful."

== Cast ==
- Adel Emam - Qadri El-Mieniawy
- Nicole Saba - Aneta
- Magdy Kamel - Mahmoud Qadri
- Khaled Sarhan - Abdelrhman Qadri
- Tamer Hagrus - Ibrahim Qadri
- Ahmed El tohamy - Hussain Qadri
- Ahmed Rateb - Shokry El-Saied
- Sami Sarhan - Server of Minister's Village
- Mohamed El Dafrawy - Prime minister
- Gharib Mahmoud - Qadri's friend
- Talaat Zakaria - Police officer
- Saied Tarabik - Qadri's friend
- Khaled Shebl - Baha'
- Heba Abdelhakim - Baha's bride
- Saied Sadek - Father of Baha's bride
- Ragaa ElGedawi - One scene
- Ahmed Helmy - Himself
- Mona Zaki - Herself
