= The Terrorist (1994 film) =

1994 Egyptian film by Nader Galal

- الإرهابي
- Directed by: Nader Galal
- Written by: Lenin El-Ramly
- Produced by: Lord Film Production
- Starring: Adel Emam; Salah Zulfikar; Sherine
- Release date: 1994
- Running time: 130 minutes
- Country: Egypt
- Language: Arabic

The Terrorist, originally Al-Erhabi (Arabic: الإرهابي, romanized: Al-Irhābī), is a popular 1994 Egyptian film by Nader Galal and starring Adel Emam, Salah Zulfikar and Madiha Yousri. The film is Salah Zulfikar's last film role and was released posthumously.

== Plot ==
Brother Ali is an Islamic radical scheming against the government and Egyptian society. Hurt after escaping the scene of an assassination, he is taken by the girl who hit him to her father's house. Her father is Dr. Abdel Moneim, a famous doctor living with his family. They are a local modern Muslim family, unaware of his radical ties. After living with the family and learning about tolerance and love, he has doubts about his views. He is killed by his former comrades after challenging their leader.

== Reception ==
The film, despite its controversial subject matter and the posting of police at theaters to guard against violence, was reportedly an immediate success in Egypt upon its release in 1994, earning back half of its US$447,000 budget in three days. The Egyptian government was supportive of its message. Minister of Information Safwat El-Sherif stated that the movie "reveals, in a dramatic manner, the internal contradictions within the terrorist movement ... It illustrates that whenever anyone is allowed to see society clearly they give up extremism."

After the Egyptian Revolution of 2011, Emam was sued by Islamist Asran Mansur, and sentenced (in absentia) in 2012 to three months in jail by an Egyptian court for allegedly "defaming Islam" for his role in this film and the play al-Zaeem (The Leader). However, a few months later, the actor won its appeal against the Islam-defamation conviction after the judge at the Misdemeanors Court in Haram had watched the movie and did not deem it anti-Islam.

== Primary cast includes ==
- Adel Emam - Ali Abd-El-Zaher
- Salah Zulfikar - Dr. Abdel Moneim
- Madiha Yousri - Soraya
- Sherine - Sawsan
- Hanan Shawky - Faten
- Mohamed El-Dafrawi - Fouad Mass'oud
- Ahmed Rateb - El Akh Seif
- Mustafa Metwalli - Hany

== See also ==
- Egyptian cinema
- List of Egyptian films of 1994
- List of Egyptian films of the 1990s
