= My Wife's Goblin =

- عفريت مراتي
- Directed by: Fatin Abdel Wahab
- Screenplay by: Lucien Lambert; Ali El Zorkany
- Produced by: Sadik Abdel Aziz
- Starring: Salah Zulfikar; Shadia
- Cinematography: Wadid Serry
- Edited by: Hussein Ahmed
- Music by: Mounir Mourad; Michel Youssef; Hussein El Sayed
- Distributed by: Gamal El Leithy's films
- Release date: 7 October 1968
- Running time: 100 minutes
- Country: Egypt
- Language: Egyptian Arabic

My Wife's Goblin also known as My Wife's Ghost (Arabic: عفريت مراتي, translit. Afreet Meraty) is a 1968 Egyptian romantic comedy film directed by Fatin Abdel Wahab.

== Plot ==
Aida and Saleh are married, Aida suffers from emptiness due to her husband Saleh's constant preoccupation with his work or with his friends. She fills her free time by watching movies. However, her constant viewing of movies causes her to impersonate characters. Sometimes she plays the heroine of "Ghada al-Kamelia," other times she plays Raya after watching the movie "Raya and Sakina." Another time she causes a scandal for her husband when she impersonates Irma Lados in the presence of her husband's guests who have come to the house with their manager to congratulate him on his promotion.

After all of Saleh's failed attempts to treat his wife, his friend Raef suggested a plan to treat Aida by making her believe that her husband Saleh's real name is Hawash Hankoura and that he has a criminal past and that he has returned to his criminal activities with the help of his friends Shafei and Lamei. The plan succeeds in distracting Aida from watching movies, but they go too far with their plan when Raef suggests they carry out a fake robbery of the bank where Saleh works. However, when Saleh, Shafei and Lamei arrive at the bank with Aida behind them, the police arrest them on charges of robbing the bank and take them to an unknown location.

There, it turns out that they are not police officers, but members of a gang headed by Saleh's alleged friend Raef. They robbed the bank and intended to frame Saleh and his friends, but the police came and uncovered the plot and arrested the gang. Aida returned to her normal state, and Saleh devoted himself to taking care of his wife and home again.

== Cast ==
- Salah Zulfikar as Saleh
- Shadia as Aida
- Emad Hamdy as Raef
- Adel Emam as Shafai
- Hassan Hussein as Lamei
- Amal Zayed as Aida's mother
- Hassan Mustafa as Hefzy, Saleh's manager at the bank
- Hala Fakher as Inayat, Saleh's sister
- Al-Toukhi Tawfiq as the gang member
- Hussein Ismail as Salama Khadim Raef
- Nabila Al-Sayed as Anisa
- Ibrahim Saafan as Irma Laddus' customer
- Salama Elias as the gang member
- Abbas Rahmi as bank manager
- Sanaa Maher as the bank manager's wife
- Soheir Reda as Hefzy's wife
- Syed Abdullah as Dr. Sami

== See also ==
- Cinema of Egypt
- Lists of Egyptian films
- Salah Zulfikar filmography
- List of Egyptian films of 1968
- List of Egyptian films of the 1960s
