= Virgo (film) =

- Egyptian Arabic: برج العذراء
- Directed by: Mahmoud Zulfikar
- Written by: Farouk Saeed
- Produced by: Khalil Diab
- Starring: Salah Zulfikar; Nahed Sherif; Adel Emam
- Cinematography: Ali Khair Allah
- Edited by: Fekry Rostom
- Production company: El Shoala Films
- Distributed by: General Egyptian Organization for Cinema Production
- Release date: 3 October 1970 (Egypt)
- Country: Egypt
- Language: Egyptian Arabic

Virgo (Egyptian Arabic: برج العذراء, translit. Borj Al-Athraa, aliases: The Planet of the Virgo) is a 1970 Egyptian film directed by Mahmoud Zulfikar. It stars Salah Zulfikar, Nahed Sherif and Adel Emam. The film was produced by Khalil Diab for El Shoala Films and was released on October 3, 1970 by the General Egyptian Organization for Cinema Production.

== Synopsis ==
Fahmy is an ardent believer in Astrology and horoscopes and manages his life according to them. A number of events increase his conviction, such as his promotion at work, which the horoscope predicts, the death of his uncle, and then his inheritance from him. An astrologer convinces him that his age is linked to a Virgo girl who has a black birthmark, which he is looking for. He discovers that she is Nana the fiancée of his friend Amin, so he tries to save her life. Nana and Ilham his wife agree on a plan to convince Fahmy of the mistake of relying on astrology.

== Crew ==
- Director: Mahmoud Zulfikar
- Screenplay: Farouk Saeed
- Production studio: El Shoala Films (Mohamed Younes)
- Distributor: General Egyptian Organization for Cinema Production
- Cinematographer: Ali Khair Allah
- Editor: Fekry Rostom

== Cast ==
- Salah Zulfikar as (Fahmy)
- Nahed Sherif as (Nana)
- Adel Emam as (Amin)
- Lebleba as (Ilham)
- Hussein Ismail as (GM of sub-contractor)
- Mokhtar Amin as (Hussain)
- Kawthar Shafik as (Hanaa)
- Sanaa Younes as (Ehsan)
- Hussein El Touni as (Ismail)
- Fifi Youssef as (Hussein's wife)
- Khadiga Mahmoud as (cigarette seller)
- Abdel Ghani Al-Nagdy as (Dajil Falafel)
- El Sayed Rady as (Khalil Diab - Psychiatrist)
- Abdel Moneim Abdel Rahman as (Ali)
- Amira as herself
- Farouk Falawkas as (lawyer)
- Saleh El-Iskandarani as (Officer of Sub Contractor)
- Mohammed Sultan as (Kamal)
- Emad Muharram as (invitee at the home evening party)

== See also ==
- Salah Zulfikar filmography
- List of Egyptian films of 1970
- List of Egyptian films of the 1970s
