= The Beggar (film) =

- Directed by: Ahmed Al-Sabaawi
- Written by: Samir Abdelazim
- Starring: Adel Emam
- Release date: 1983
- Running time: 120 minutes
- Country: Egypt
- Language: Arabic

The Beggar (Arabic: المتسول, translit. Al-Motasawel) is a 1983 Egyptian comedy film directed by Ahmed Al-Sabaawi and starring Adel Emam.

== Plot ==
Emam plays Hasanin, an uneducated man who leaves his small village to live with his uncle's family in the city. After having no luck keeping a job, he must return to his village. On the way, after getting kicked out of a mosque he tries to sleep at, he ends up in a homeless shelter that he discovers is actually run by a gang forcing people to beg in the streets after maiming them. Hasanin is set out to pose as if he is a blind beggar.

== Primary cast ==
- Adel Emam
- Isaad Younis

== Reception ==
The film's depiction of beggars spurred a lawsuit by peasants against Imam, in which Imam prevailed.
