= Madiha Yousri =

Egyptian actress

- مديحة يسري
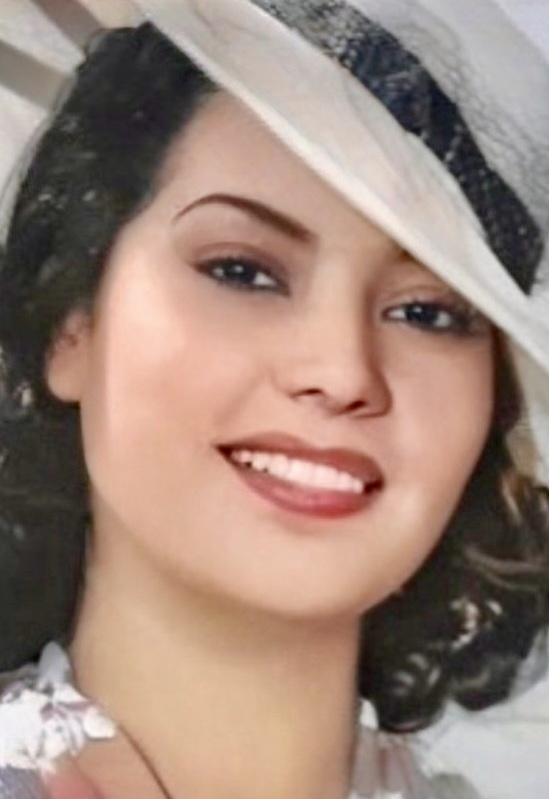
- Yousri c. 1949
- Born: Honouma Habib Khalil Ali; 3 December 1921; Cairo, Sultanate of Egypt
- Died: 29 May 2018 (aged 96); Egypt
- Occupations: Film and television actress
- Known for: Her classical romance roles in the Egyptian cinema
- Notable work: Azhar wa Ashwak

Hannouma Habib Khalil Ali (Arabic: هنومة حبيب خليل علي; 3 December 1921 – 29 May 2018), known professionally as Madiha Yousri (مديحة يسري), was an Egyptian film and television actress. She was prolific in the Golden Age of Egyptian cinema and starred in several classic Egyptian films over the course of her career, spanning a time of over 50 years. Her work spanned genres from drama, comedy and tragedy.

Yousri was also very known for her support to Egypt's president Abdel Fattah el-Sisi and the 26 of July revolution. She was also appointed by late President Hosni Mubarak as a member of the Shura council in 1998.

== Early life ==
Honouma Habib Khalil Ali was born on December 3, 1921, in Cairo to a lower middle-class Egyptian family within a humble neighborhood.

== Career ==
Yousri was discovered by the Egyptian director Mohammed Karim while sitting with friends at a cafe. When she would later describe the meeting, she remembered listening to Karim while thinking that her father would never allow his daughter to act. Her debut role was in a film directed by Karin in 1940, Mamnu'at Al-Hub (ممنوعة الحب; en: Forbidden Love). She went on to appear in many films, alongside many of Egypt's famous musicians of the time, including Abdel-Halim Hafez, Mohamed Fawzi and Farid Al-Atrash.

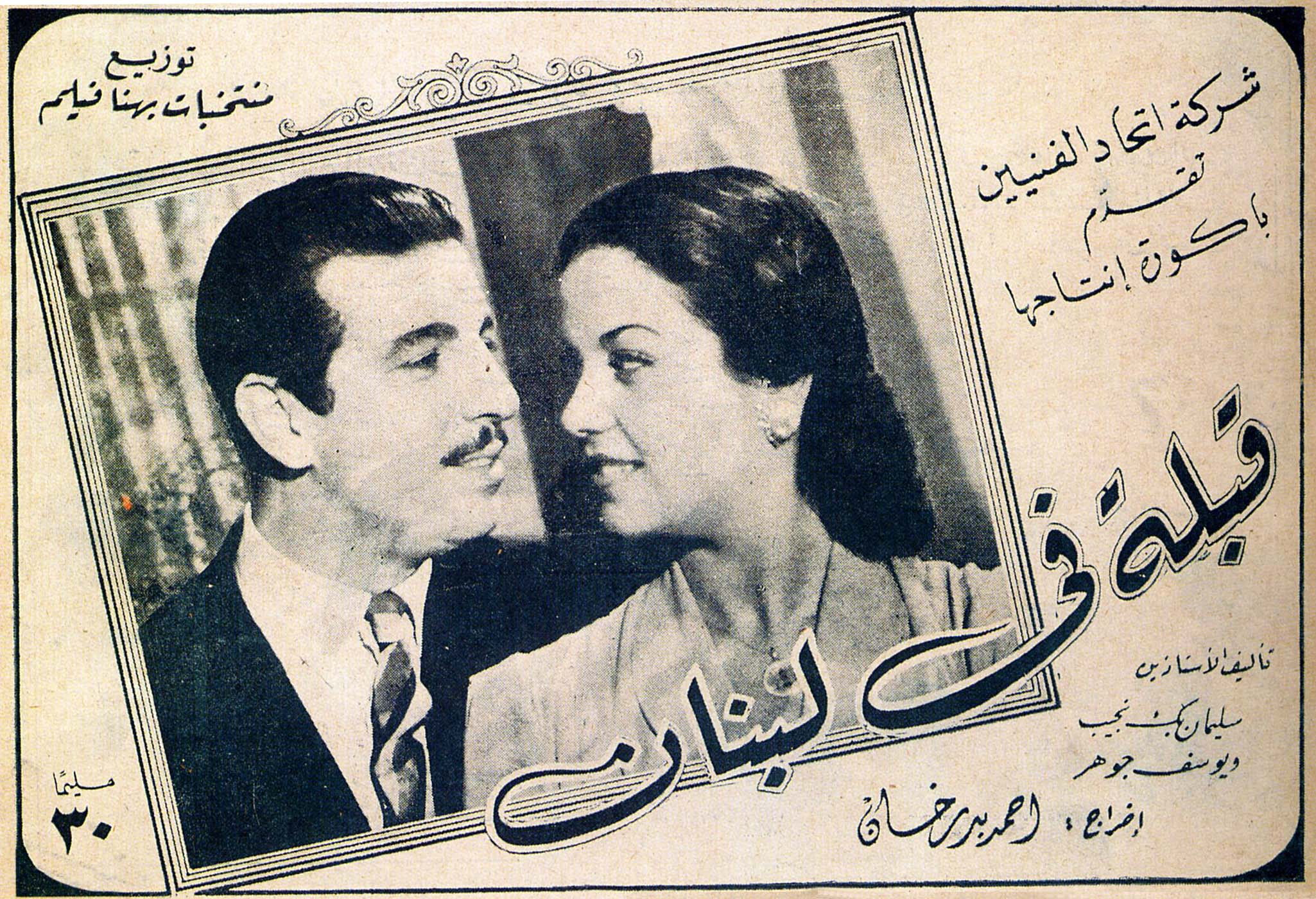
Madiha Yousri with Anwar Wagdi on the poster for Kubla fi Lubnan (1945)

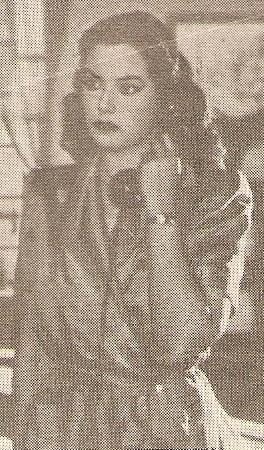
Madiha Yousry in an acting scene, c. 1949

In the 1940s, Time magazine chose Yousri as one of the world's 10 most beautiful women. In 1963, Yousri was awarded Egypt's State Medal of Creativity. In 1969, she was a member of the jury at the 6th Moscow International Film Festival. She was known for her classical romance roles in the Egyptian cinema, as well as participating in many Egyptian TV series playing mainly the role of mother or grandmother.

Near the end of her life, Yousri was given an honorary doctorate from the Egyptian Arts Academy.

== Death ==
On 29 May 2018, aged 96, Madiha died from chronic illness in a local hospital.

== Selected filmography ==
- 1944 – Rossassa fel Qalb (رصاصة في القلب; en: A Bullet in the Heart)
- 1947 – Azhar wa Ashwak (أزهار وأشواك; en: Flowers and Thorns)
- 1952 – Lahn al-Kholood (لحن الخلود; en: Immortal Song)
- 1953 – Wafaa (وفاء; en: Loyalty)
- 1954 – Hayaa aw Mout (حياة أو موت; en: Life or Death)
- 1956 – Ard Al-Ahlam (أرض الأحلام; en: Land of Dreams), nominated for the Palme d'Or at Cannes Film Festival
- 1962 – Al-Khataya (الخطايا; en: The Sins)
- 1971 – Al-Hub Al-Moharram (الحب المحرم; en: Forbidden Love)
- 1979 – Khally Balak min Giranak (خلي بالك من جيرانك; en: Watch Out your Neighbors)
- 1983 – Ayoub (أيوب; en: Ayoub)
- 1994 – Al-Irhabi (الإرهابي; en: The Terrorist), Madiha's final cinema appearance
