= Immortal Song (film) =

- Directed by: Henry Barakat
- Written by: Henry Barakat; Yussef Issa
- Starring: Faten Hamama; Farid Al Atrache; Magda; Madiha Yousri
- Cinematography: Abdelhalim Nasr
- Music by: Farid Al Atrache
- Release date: December 15, 1952
- Running time: 132 minutes
- Country: Egypt
- Language: Egyptian Arabic

Immortal Song, originally Lahn al-Kholood (Arabic: لحن الخلود, romanized: Laḥn al-Khulūd), is a 1952 Egyptian romance/drama film directed by Henry Barakat. It stars Farid Al Atrache, Faten Hamama, Magda, Madiha Yousri, and Seraj Munir.

== Plot ==
Waheed (Farid Al Atrache), a famous music composer, meets Wafa' (Faten Hamama), a family member and the daughter of a close friend and relative of his. Wafa' has secretly had a crush on him for years and tries unsuccessfully to show her affection and hint that to Waheed. He thinks her love is nothing more than an expected family member's fondness.

Wafa's father dies and Waheed offers her and her sister to move into his house and live with him and promises to take care of them. Wafa' finds herself living under the same roof with the man she loves, except that Waheed is going to marry a woman named Siham (Madiah Yousri). Time passes and Wafa' tries hardly to express her love to Waheed. She treats him well and pampers him and he eventually falls in love with her.

== Cast ==
- Farid Al Atrache as Wahid
- Faten Hamama as Wafa'
- Magda as Sana
- Seraj Munir as Abdel Halim
- Madiha Yousri as Siham
- Salah Nazmi as Rashad

== See also ==
- Cinema of Egypt
