= The Street Player =

1984 film

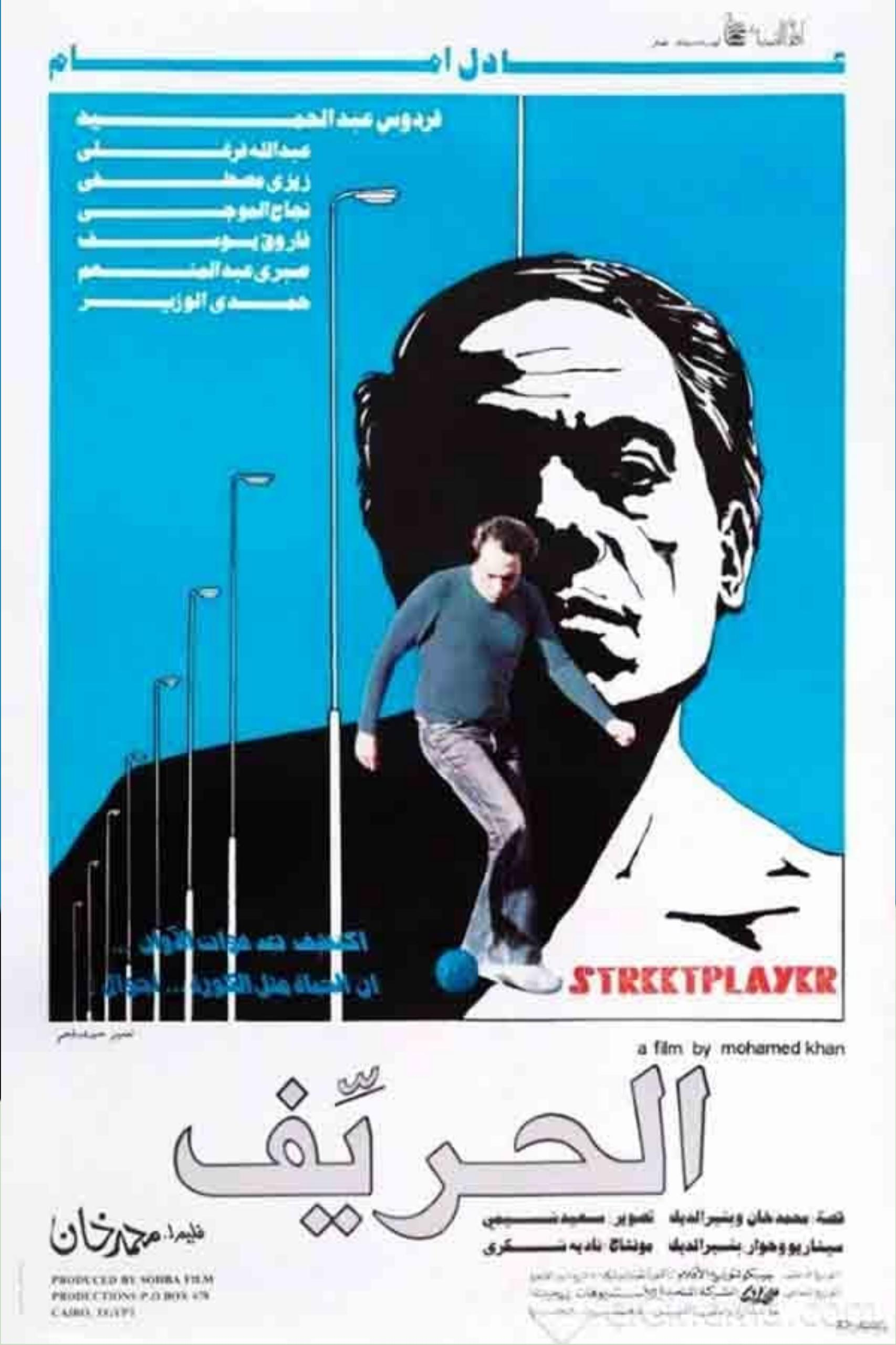
- Directed by: Mohamed Khan
- Written by: Mohamed Khan
- Starring: Adel Emam
- Release date: July 1983
- Running time: 148 minutes
- Country: Egypt
- Language: Arabic

The Street Player (Arabic: الحرِّيف, translit. El harrif) is a 1983 Egyptian drama film directed by Mohamed Khan. It was entered into the 13th Moscow International Film Festival.

== Cast ==
- Adel Emam as Fares
- Fardous Abdel Hamid as Dalal
- Nagah El-Mogui as Abdallah
- Abdallah Farghali as Rizk
- Hamdi Al Wazir as Mohsen
- Abdalla Mahmoud as Mokhtar
