= Ahmed Rateb =

Egyptian actor (1949–2016)

- أحمد راتب
- Born: 23 January 1948; Cairo, Egypt
- Died: 14 December 2016 (aged 67); Cairo, Egypt
- Occupation: Actor
- Years active: 1979–2016

Ahmed Rateb (Arabic: أحمد راتب; 23 January 1948 – 14 December 2016) was an Egyptian actor. He appeared in more than sixty films.

== Selected filmography ==
Year	Title	Role	Notes
2016	Mawlana		
2012	Mr. & Mrs. Ewis		
2010	Assal Eswed		
2008	Captin Hima		
2006	The Yacoubian Building		
2005	The Embassy in the Building		
2003	The Danish Experience		
1994	The Terrorist		
1981	Dawn of the Mummy		

== See also ==
- Cinema of Egypt
- Lists of Egyptian films
