= Nader Galal =

Egyptian actor (1941–2014)

- Born: 29 January 1941
- Died: 16 December 2014 (aged 73)
- Years active: 1965–2014
- Children: Ahmed Nader Galal
- Parents: Ahmed Galal (father); Mary Queeny (mother)

Nader Galal (Arabic: نادر جلال; 29 January 1941 – December 2014) was an Egyptian television and film director. He was best known for directing El-Irhaby (The Terrorist, 1994), Salam Ya Sahby (Goodbye my friend), and the Bekhit wa Adila series of films.

== Early life and education ==
Galal was born in January 1941 to an artistic family. His father was the Egyptian director Ahmed Galal and his mother was Mary Queeny, the Lebanese-born Egyptian actress and film producer.

He obtained a bachelor's degree in commerce in 1963, and in 1964 graduated from the Higher Institute of Cinema in Cairo with a diploma in film directing.

== Career ==
Galal started his career as an assistant director of Al-Shaqiqan (The Brothers) in 1965. and directed more than 50 films. He worked with actors like Adel Imam and Nadia El-Gendy.

He directed several action films, including: Batal men Waraq (Paper Hero; 1988), A Mission in Tel Aviv (1992) and Jazeerat al-shaytan (Devil's Island; 1990). He was known for El-Irhaby (The Terrorist, 1994), Risala Ela Al-Wali (A Message to the Governor, 1998), and El-Wad Mahrouz Beta'a El-Wazir (Mahrous, the Minister's Attaché, 1999), Salam Ya Sahby (Goodbye my friend), and the Bekhit wa Adila series of films.

From 2003 onwards, he mostly directed television drama, including White Abbas in the Black Day (2004) and Abed Karman (2011).

== Personal life ==
His son, Ahmed Nader Galal is also a director, and he was named after his grandfather, Ahmed Galal.
