= Amr Adib =

Egyptian television personality

- عمرو أديب
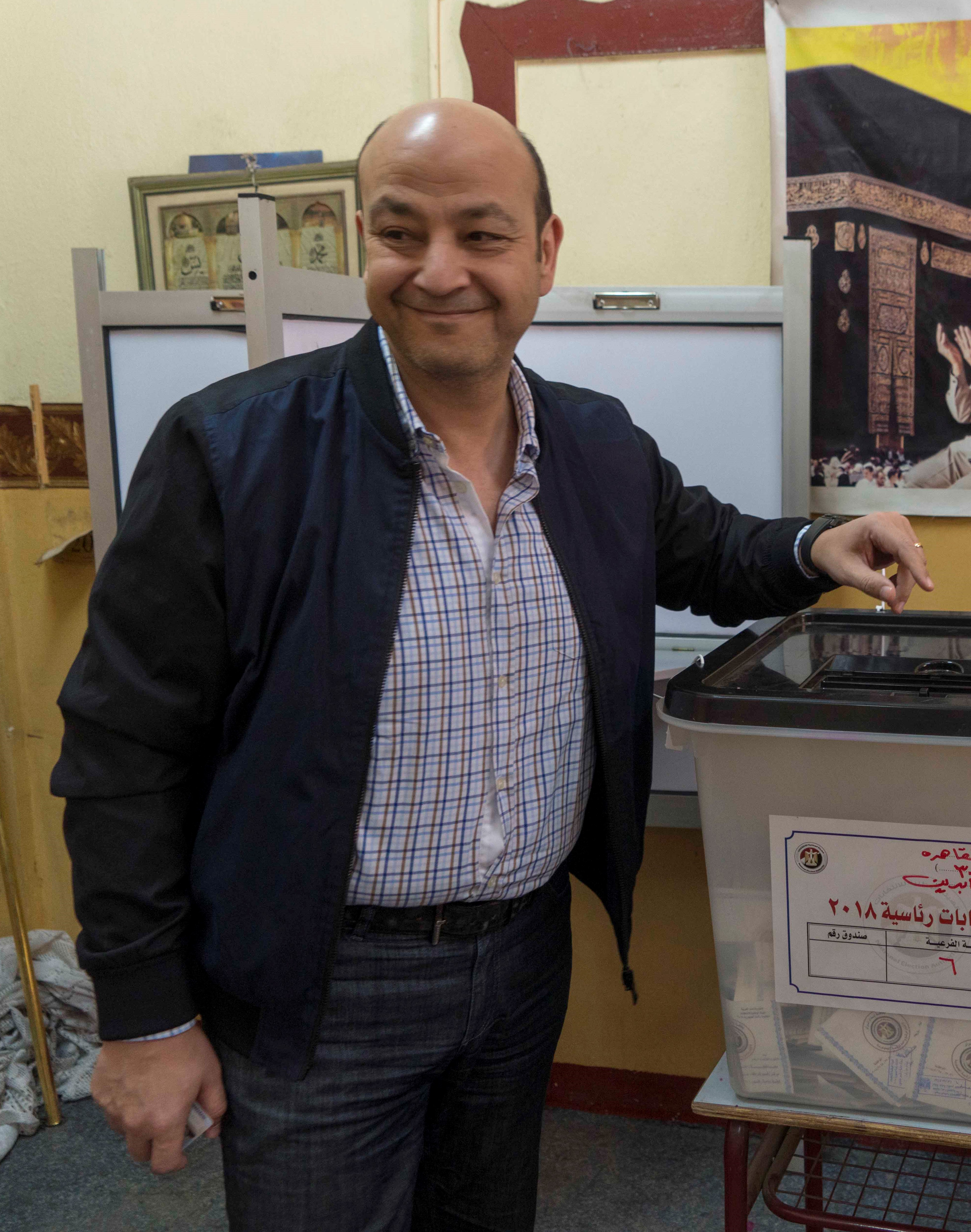
- Amr Adib on 27 March 2018
- Born: Amr Abdul Hyy Mustafa Adib; 23 October 1963 (age 62); El Mahalla El Kubra, Gharbia Governorate, Egypt
- Education: Cairo University
- Occupation: Presenter
- Spouse: Lamis Elhadidy (m. 1999; div. 2025)
- Children: Nour El Dien

Amr Adib (Arabic: عمرو أديب; born 23 October 1963) is an Egyptian TV presenter and journalist. He is currently working for MBC Masr, where he presents his popular talk show "Al-Hekaya" (الحكاية). In November 2023, Adib announced that he had obtained Saudi citizenship.
