= Adel Emam =

Egyptian actor (born 1940)

- عادل إمام
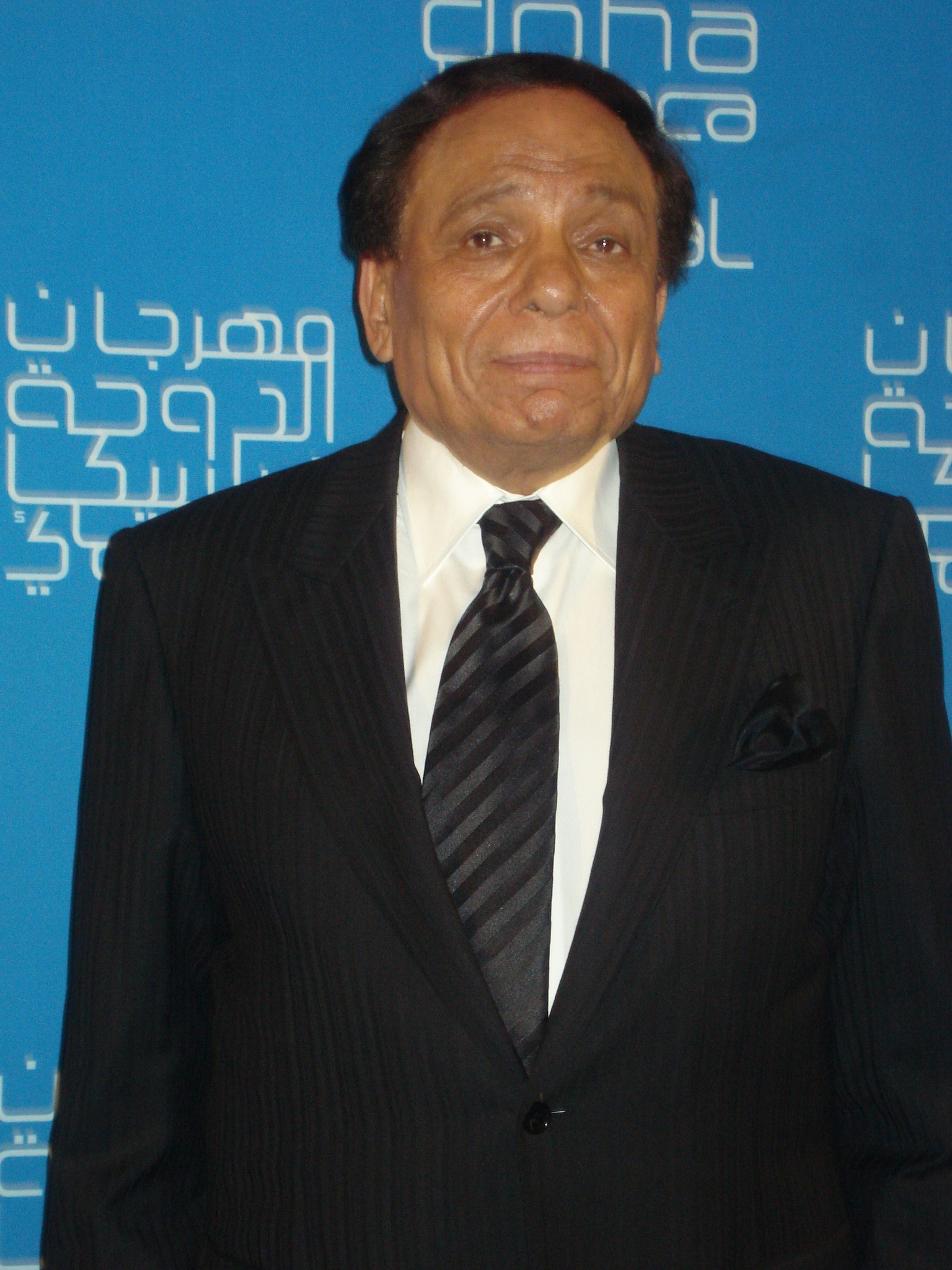
- Emam at the Doha Tribeca Film Festival 2009
- Born: Adel Mohammed Emam Mohammed Bukhariny; May 17, 1940 (age 86); Mansoura, Kingdom of Egypt
- Other names: El Zaeem (الزعيم, 'The Boss')
- Education: Cairo University
- Occupations: Actor; comedian
- Years active: 1962–2020
- Height: 1.73 m (5 ft 8 in)
- Spouse: Hala Al Shalaqani
- Children: 3, including Mohamed and Ramy
- Relatives: Mustafa Metwalli (brother-in-law)

Adel Mohammed Emam Mohammed Bukhariny (Arabic: عادل محمد إمام محمد بخاريني; born 17 May 1940) is an Egyptian film, television, and stage actor. Over a career spanning more than 150 films, plays, and television series in comedic, social, and political genres, he became known as one of the leading figures of the second generation of Egyptian and Arab comedy performers. Although primarily known for comedy, he also took on more dramatic material, and in his early secondary roles combined comedy with romance, notably in films such as My Wife, the Director General, My Wife's Dignity, My Wife's Goblin and Virgo, all films starring Salah Zulfikar.

Emam began acting in the 1960s and became one of the best-known performers in Egyptian cinema. He holds a bachelor's degree in Agriculture from Cairo University, and has appeared in more than 103 films and 10 stage plays. He is married to Hala El-Shalaqani; their children include director Ramy Emam and actor Mohamed Emam.

Through roles that addressed social and political issues, Emam gained wide popularity across the Arab world during the 1980s and 1990s and is frequently described in Egyptian media as one of the country's leading cultural figures.

Emam has received a number of lifetime achievement awards and honors from Egyptian and international film festivals. In January 2000, the United Nations appointed him a Goodwill Ambassador for UNHCR.

== Personal life ==
=== Early life and education ===
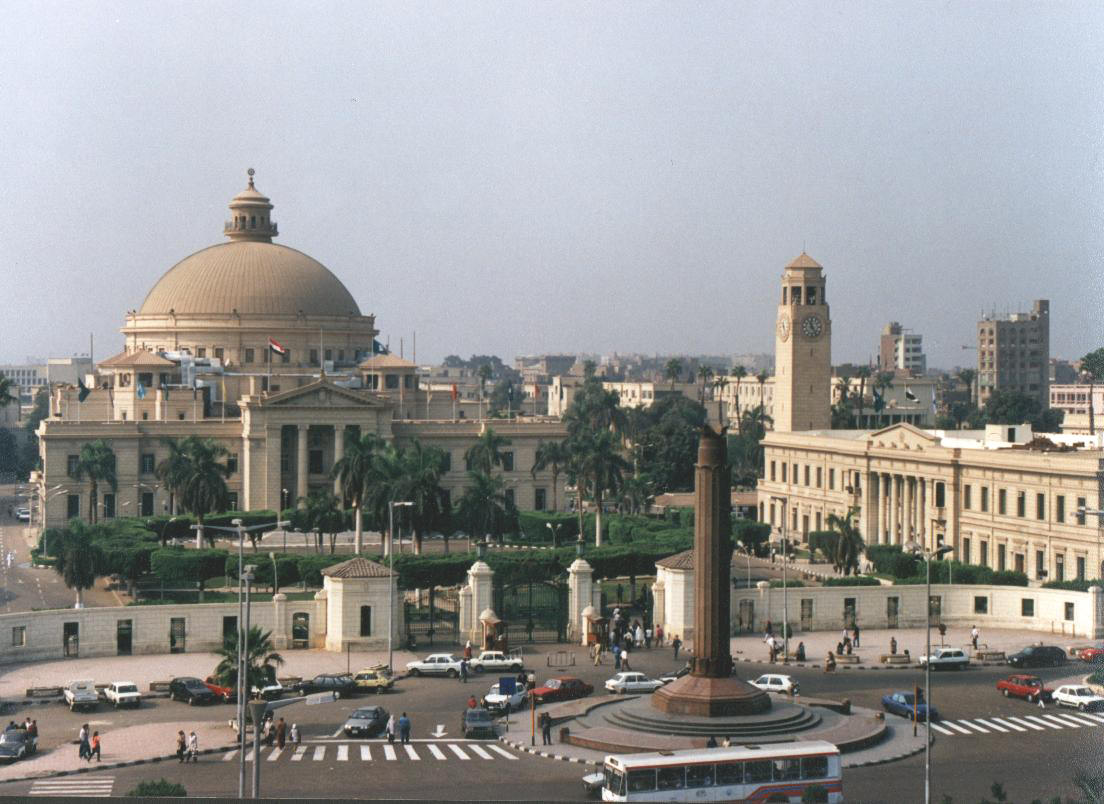
Cairo University's theater (the Grand Celebration Hall), where Emam trained on stage in his youth.

Adel Emam was born into a poor farming family on 17 May 1940 in the Sayeda Aisha district of Cairo, though his family's origins trace back to the village of Shaha in the Mansoura district of Dakahlia Governorate. His full name is Adel Mohammed Emam Mohammed Bukhariny (Arabic: عادل محمد إمام محمد بخاريني). Emam has said he was very close to his mother and was deeply affected by her death. His father, Mohamed Emam, was religious and worked as a "shawish" in the police force; he died in 1997 after suffering from Alzheimer's disease. Emam has one brother, producer Essam Emam, and two sisters, Eman and Mona. Mustafa Metwalli, his brother-in-law, is married to his sister Eman.

During his childhood, Emam moved with his family from Sayeda Aisha to the Helmiya district, then to Omrania in Giza, then to Mohandiseen, and later to Mansouria. He studied at Helmiya School before transferring to Benbaqdgan Secondary School and then to Marqosiya Secondary School in Alexandria. He then joined the Faculty of Agriculture at Cairo University, where his classmates included actor Salah El-Saadany and future Syrian Prime Minister Mahmoud Al-Zoubi. Emam has said that Amin Shalaby, Younes Shalaby, Saeed Saleh, and Salah Al-Saadani were his closest friends from university. He began performing at Cairo University's theater and appeared in the play Ana Wa Howa Wa Heya (1963) during his third year there.

=== His marriage and family ===
Emam has been married once, to Hala El-Shalaqani, since the mid-1960s. In interviews, he has said he was not initially interested in marriage, but that his wife, who came from a wealthy, land-owning family with ties to the Liberal Constitutional Party, was determined to marry him despite their different social backgrounds, and that her family was reluctant given his status at the time as an actor in minor roles. In one televised account, Emam described how he and his wife were once at the home of their friend Samir Khafaga when he first saw her, and that although others around them tried to flirt with her, he did not, saying he did not know how.

Hala El-Shalaqani discussed their early relationship in an interview with media personality Mufid Fawzy, saying she had insisted on marrying Emam because he was shy and hesitant about starting a new relationship. She recalled: "He once told me that he wasn't thinking about marriage at all." Emam has said the couple chose not to hold a wedding ceremony in order to save money, and that they built their household gradually, first buying a chair, then a refrigerator, then a stove. He has also said the marriage took place without his wife's family's approval, since they objected to his status as a film extra at the time, adding: "God loves me because I married Hala." Emam has three children: director Ramy Emam, Sarah Emam, and actor Mohamed Emam, who played Taha El-Shazli in The Yacoubian Building. He has eight grandchildren: Adel, Ezz El-Din, and Roqaya (Ramy's children); Hala, Camellia, and Amina (Sarah's daughters); and Khadija and Qismat (Mohamed's daughters). Ramy's wife is Yasmine, Sarah's husband is Ahmed Mokbel, and Mohamed's wife is Nouran Talaat.

Emam typically spends summers with his children and grandchildren at a family villa on the North Coast. He is a keen reader and keeps a large personal library, and has a longstanding hobby of gardening.

=== Net worth ===
No official figures for Emam's wealth have been published. Some media reports have estimated his net worth at around $100 million, making him the richest actor in Egypt, though these figures are not independently verified.

== Acting career ==
=== 1962–1969: Early career breakthrough ===
Emam began performing in theater in Ana w Howa w Heya (1962) with Fouad El-Mohandes and Shwikar, and made his film debut in 1967 in small roles. His early film work included My Wife, the Director General (1966), My Wife's Dignity (1967), followed by his first significant role in My Wife's Goblin (1968) opposite Salah Zulfikar and Shadia. He was part of a younger generation of actors who emerged during a period of social and political change in 1960s Egypt, and was noted for both comedic and dramatic range. Despite his early minor roles, Emam drew the attention of writer Mahmud Sadani, who discussed him in his 1969 book The Comedians:

If Adel Imam realized how talented and in demand he is, he would have saved himself from the trap set for him. If he didn’t quickly escape from this narrow corner he was placed in, to roles of light-hearted villainy, the charming conman, a mix of Richard Widmark and Clifton Webb, a blend of Tawfik El-Deken and Fouad el-Mohandes, a concoction of Hassan Yousef and Abdel Moneim Ibrahim, even if Adel failed to escape this fate, even if he remained stagnant in supporting roles, it would not diminish his talent, nor undermine his stature as a brilliant, talented, and great artist.

— Mahmud Sadani, The Comedians (1969), p. 167

=== 1970s: Rise to fame ===
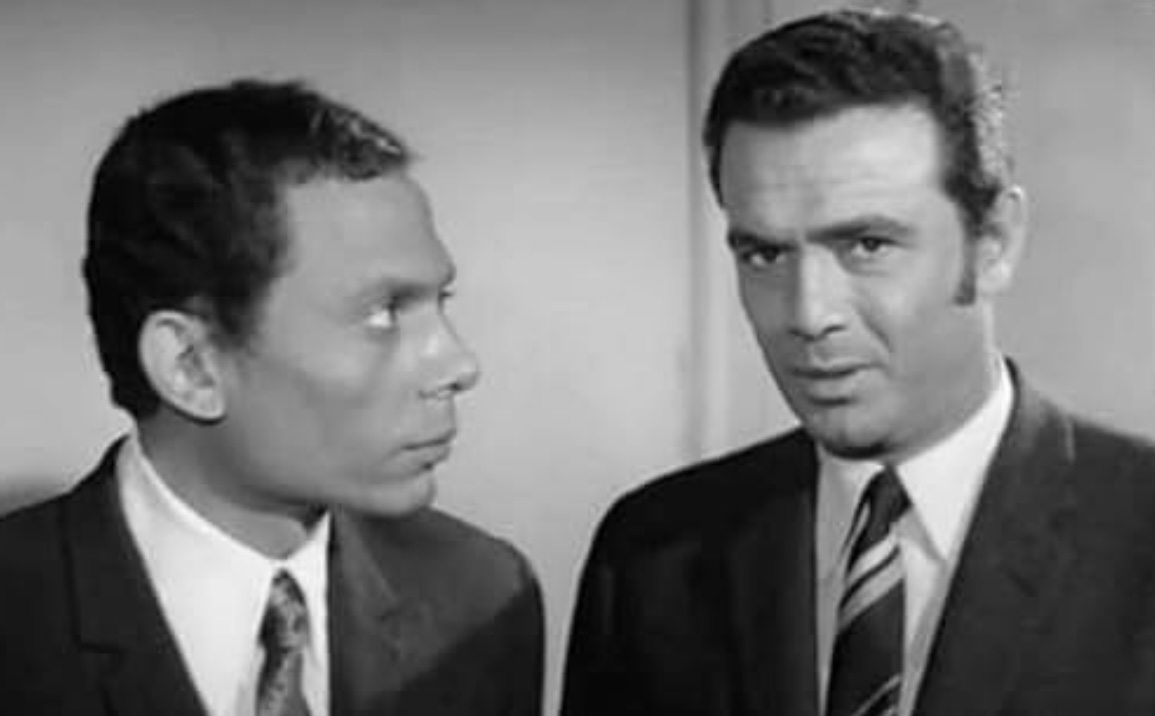
Emam (left) with Salah Zulfikar in Virgo, 1970.

In the early 1970s, Emam gained a reputation for comedic and dramatic versatility, with roles including Virgo (1970), alongside Salah Zulfikar, and Searching for a Scandal (1973), shared with Mervat Amin and Samir Sabry.

During the early 1970s, Emam appeared in films addressing themes of love, youth, and societal pressures. Bahibek Ya Helwa (1970), co-starring Hassan Youssef and Nahed Sherif, was a romantic comedy centered on emerging youth culture and its effect on relationships.

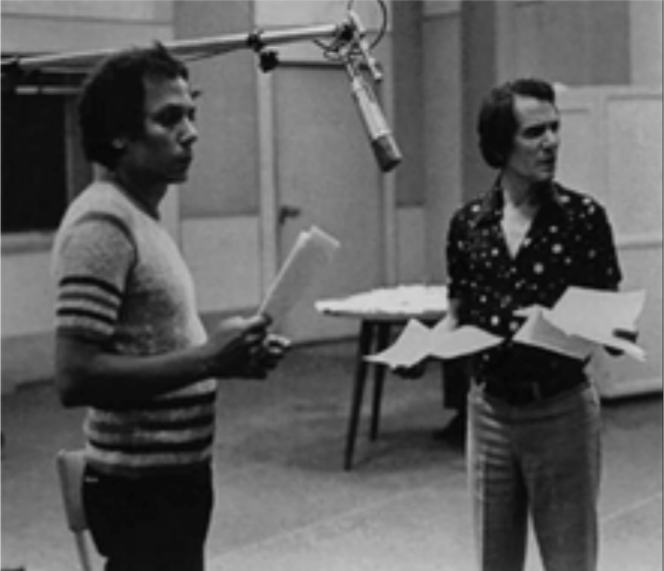
Emam (left) with Abdel Halim Hafez during a recording session, 1973.

By the mid-1970s, Emam was a household name in Egyptian cinema. His roles in comedy and theatre, including Madraset El Moshaghbeen (1973), established him as one of the leading comic actors of the period. In that play, he played the mischievous character Bahgat El Abasery, one of his best-known roles. In 1976, he starred in the play Shahed Ma Shafsh Haga (Witness Who Saw Nothing) alongside Omar Al-Hariri and Nahed Jabr.

=== 1980s: Versatile roles ===
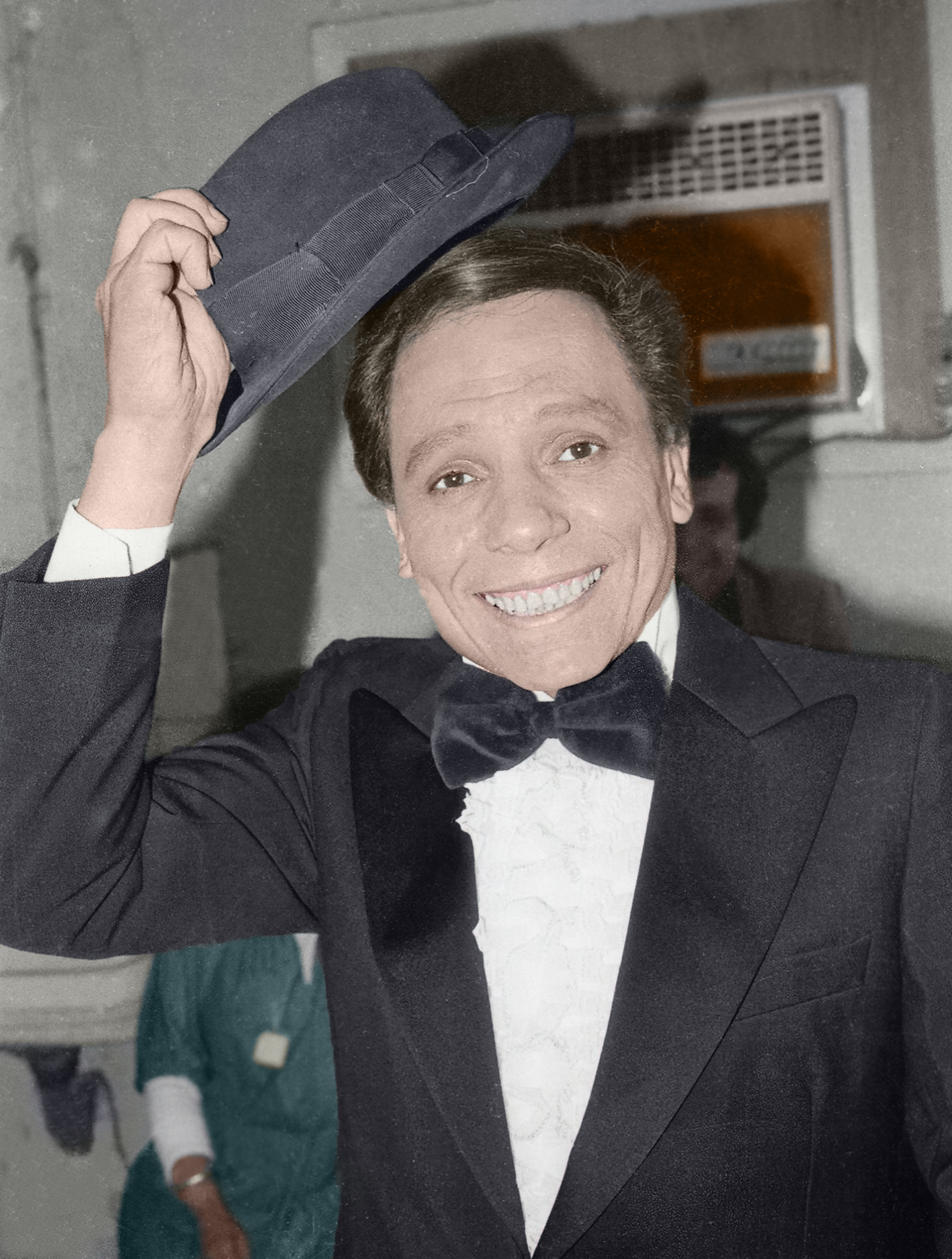
Emam in the 1980s.

The 1980s were a period of professional growth for Emam, who took on a wider range of characters across comedy and drama. The 1981 film The Suspect (Arabic: المشبوه, 1981) marked a shift from comedy toward crime drama: Emam played Maher Al-Nemr, a man confronting his criminal past while trying to build a better future, in a film scored by composer Hani Shnouda. The film is one of several from this period, alongside collaborators including director Ashraf Fahmy and Shnouda, that have been described as part of a broader turn in Egyptian cinema toward realism and social commentary.

Emam was among the highest-paid Egyptian actors of the 1980s, and his films were reported to have led the domestic box office during the period. He co-starred with actress Soad Hosny in several films, including Love in a Jail Cell (1983). In The Street Player (1983), he played a character combining comedy with social commentary. Other films of the period included Smart but Foolish (1980); The Human Lives Only Once (1981), in which he played a man undergoing a personal transformation; At the Minister's Door (1982), in which his character dealt with bureaucratic obstacles while seeking a government job; Hamada and Tutu's Gang (1982), which combined action and comedy in a story involving organized crime; and The Beggar (1983), in which he played a wealthy man who becomes homeless.

In 1984, Emam starred in So That the Smoke Doesn't Fly, based on the novel by Ihsan Abdel Quddous, playing a man struggling with addiction. The Humans and the Jinn (1985) was his only film in the horror genre — then uncommon in Arab cinema — in which he played a man caught between the human and supernatural worlds. He also starred in the play Al-Wad Sayed Al-Shaghal, playing a young man named Sayed; it has been described by some critics as among the best-known modern Arabic plays.

=== 1990s: Career peak ===
The 1990s are generally regarded as the peak of Emam's career: he was among the highest-paid actors and a leading star of Arab cinema. His collaborations with director Sherif Arafa such as Terrorism and Kebab (1992) produced iconic works.

The 1990s marked the peak of Adel Emam's career, as he reigned over the Egyptian cinema, being the highest-paid actor and the number one star in Arab cinema. His collaborations with directors like Sherif Arafa produced iconic works such as Terrorism and Kebab (1992), though technically just outside this decade, and Jazeerat al-Shaytan (1987). Emam’s style in the 1990s was often characterized by strong social criticism laced with humor. His performances in these films resonated with wide audiences across the Arab world, earning him massive popularity.

In an interview with journalist Mufid Fawzy on the set of El-Mansi (1993), Emam said, "Time is my only competitor." He explained that he took on a heavy workload, often filming more than one movie a year while performing in a play daily.

Emam continued to take on socially and politically themed roles through the 1990s. These included Al-La'ib Ma'a Al-Kibar (Playing with the Big Boys, 1991), a black comedy in which he plays an ordinary man drawn into a high-stakes game involving powerful figures; The Terrorist, combining comedy with a political message and portraying a former terrorist seeking redemption; and Risala Ela Al-Wali (1998), in which he played a man tasked with delivering an important letter to a corrupt governor. He earned the nickname Al-Zaeem ("The Leader") after starring in the 1993 play of the same name, in which his character dealt with themes of political power and leadership.

=== 2000–2023: Continued prominence ===
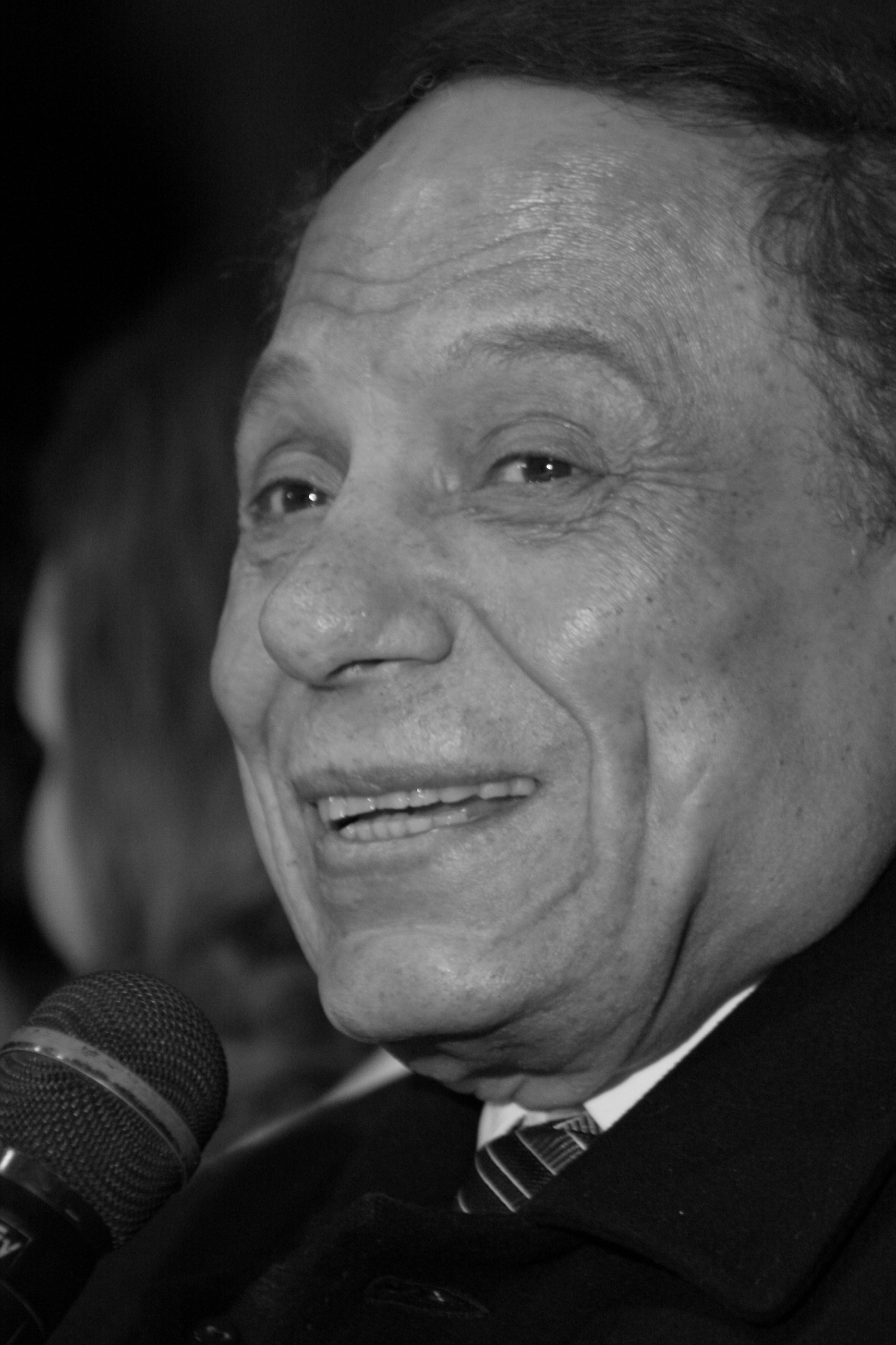
Adel Emam on February 2, 2006

During the 2000s, Adel Emam appeared in films and television series. In 2003, he starred in The Danish Experience, which was reported to be the highest-grossing film in Lebanon that year.

In 2005, Emam starred in The Embassy in the Building, playing a Cairo resident whose life is disrupted when the Israeli embassy moves into his apartment building. In 2006, he appeared in The Yacoubian Building, an adaptation of the novel by Alaa Al Aswany. Set in a deteriorating apartment building in downtown Cairo, the film follows several residents. Emam played Zaki el-Dessouki, an aging womanizer whose story is one of the film's main plotlines.

Many of Adel Emam's films and stage plays addressed political, social and religious issues in Egypt such as religious extremism, political authority and relations between different groups in Egyptian society. In The Terrorist (1994), directed by Nader Galal, Emam played an Islamist militant who begins to question his beliefs after living with a modern Egyptian Muslim family. The film marked the final screen appearance of Salah Zulfikar.

Emam later collaborated with producer Emad Adeeb on several films, including Morgan Ahmed Morgan (2007) and Hassan and Marcus (2008). The latter film starred Emam alongside Omar Sharif and explored religious extremism and sectarian tensions in Egypt.

After several years away from television drama, Adel Emam returned in 2012 with Fer'et Naji Atallah (Naji Atallah's Group). He later starred in Ramadan television series including El Araf (2013), Saheb El Saada (2014), Afaret Adly Alam (2017) and Awalem Khafeya (2018).

His final television series was Valentino, which aired in 2020. Media reports described Emam as one of the highest-paid actors in Ramadan television, although estimates of his salary and ranking varied by source.

In May 2024, Alzheimer's, a 2010 film starring Emam, returned to cinemas in Egypt and several Arab countries to mark his 84th birthday. The screenings ran for three days, beginning on 16 May in Egypt and some Gulf markets. Producer Esaad Younes organized the re-release as part of the birthday celebrations.

=== Retirement ===
On January 21, 2024, it was officially confirmed that Emam has retired, as his son, Rami Emam, stated that his father decided to step away from artistic endeavors to dedicate his time to family life. He retired from acting after a 60-year career.

== Works ==
=== Film ===
Year	Film in Arabic	Name Translation	Role
1964	Ana Wa Howa Wa Heya	Me, him and her (film)	Dessouky – assistant to Hamdy the lawyer
1965	Al-Modir Al-Fanny	The Artistic Director	
1965	Al-Uqalaa Al-Thalatha	The Three Wise Men	the buffet worker (minor role)
1966	Mirati Modeer Aam	My Wife, the Director General	Abou El-Magd
1966	3 Losoos	Three Thieves	a passenger on the bus (minor role)
1966	Sayed Darwish	(biographical film about composer Sayed Darwish)	
1966	Agaza Bel-Afya	A Well-Deserved Vacation	Mabrouk, a detective
1967	Karamat Zawgaty	My Wife's Dignity	Amin
1967	Al-Khoroog Men Al-Ganna	Exit from Paradise	Abbas, secretary to the Mokhtar (mayor)
1967	Al-Ragel Da Hayganenny	This Man Will Drive Me Crazy	Talba Abbas, a lawyer's assistant
1968	Afreet Mirati	My Wife's Goblin	Shafei
1968	Losoos Laken Zorafaa	Thieves, But Charming Ones	Ismail
1968	Helwa We Shaqeya	Pretty and Naughty	Latif
1968	Kayfa Tasriq Milyoneir	How to Rob a Millionaire	Mansour
1968	Afraah	Weddings	Halim
1968	Ana Al-Doctor	I Am the Doctor	Abdo Nofalgin
1968	Hikayet 3 Banat	The Story of 3 Girls	Fahmy
1969	Ana We Meraty Wel Gaw	Me, My Wife, and the Weather	Shawkat
1969	Fatat Al-Este'raad	The Showgirl	Fahmy
1969	Nos Sa'a Gawaz	Half an Hour of Marriage	Sameh
1969	Al-Nas Elly Gowa	The People Inside	Souka
1969	7 Ayyam Fi Al-Ganna	7 Days in Paradise	Shokry, a journalist
1970	Borj El-Athraa	Virgo	Amin
1970	Hob Al-Morahekat	Teenage Girls in Love	
1970	Bahibek Ya Helwa	I Love You, Beautiful	Said
1970	Al-Miraya	The Mirror	Hamdy
1970	Reda Bond	(a play on "James Bond")	Salah Eid
1971	Sahira (short)	Witch	Waiter
1971	Al-Buyut Asrar	Houses Have Secrets	Raouf
1971	Gharam Fi Al-Tareeq Al-Zera'i	Love on the Agricultural Road	Hamada
1971	Rehla Latheeza	A Delicious Trip	Metwally
1971	Mozakerat Al-Anesa Manal	The Diary of Miss Manal	Aouf
1971	Shabab Fi Asefa	Youth in a Storm	Saleh
1971	Banat Fi Al-Gam'a	Girls at University	Ibrahim
1972	Adwaa Al-Madina	City Lights	Sharshar
1973	Endama Yughanna Al-Hob	When Love Is Sung	Mounir
1973	Shea' Men Al-Hob	A Bit of Love	Adel
1973	Al-Shayateen Wal-Kora	The Devils and the Ball	Okasha
1973	Al-Bahth An Fadiha	Searching for a Scandal	Magdy
1973	Kalam Fel-Hob (Shellat Al-Moshaghebeen)	Talk of Love (The Troublemakers' Gang)	the director, Rico
1974	Al-Muhem Al-Hob	What Matters Is Love	Fahmi
1974	24 Sa'a Hob	24 Hours of Love	Ahmed
1974	Shayateen Ela Al-Abad	Devils Forever	Fakhrany Abdel-Hamid
1974	Al-Zawag Al-Sa'eed	The Happy Marriage	Magdy
1975	Al-Bahth An Al-Mataeb	In Search of Trouble	Shaaban
1975	Sabreen	Sabreen	Mohamed
1975	Al-Kul Awez Yehebb	Everyone Wants to Love	Abdel-Salam Khafaga
1975	Alo.. Ana Al-Otta	Hello, I'm the Cat	Mahboub
1975	Mamnou' Fi Laylat Al-Dokhla	Forbidden on the Wedding Night	Tahsin
1976	Malek Al-Taxi	The Taxi King	Essam
1976	Gawaz Ala Al-Hawa	Marriage on a Whim	Ghareeb
1976	Azwag Ta'esheen	Reckless Husbands	Sherif
1977	Al-Azwag Al-Shayateen	The Devilish Husbands	Mamdouh
1977	Zahrat Al-Banafsag	The Violet Flower	Nasser
1977	Gens Na'em	The Fair Sex	Adel
1977	Harami Al-Hob	The Thief of Love	Ma'moun
1978	Al Baad Yathhab Lil Mathon Maratain	Some Go to the Marriage Officer Twice	Masoud Al-Sharnoubi
1978	Mugamaroun Hawl Al-Alam	Adventurers Around the World	Mamdouh
1978	Ragab Fawq Safeeh Sakhen	Ragab on a Hot Tin Roof	Ragab Abdel-Barr
1978	Al-Mahfaza Ma'aya	The Wallet Is With Me	Atwa
1978	Shabab Yarqus Fawq Al-Nar	Youth Dancing on Fire	Adel
1978	Aib Ya Lulu.. Ya Lulu Aib	Shame on You, Lulu	Shehab Aly
1979	Ihna Bitua' al-Autobis	We are the Bus people	Jabir
1979	Khally Balak Men Giranak	Beware of Your Neighbors	Ahmed Nafei, a lawyer
1979	Qatel Ma Ataltesh Hadd	A Killer Who Never Killed Anyone	Adel Ghareeb
1979	Al-Lo'ba	The Game	Zaghloul
1979	Al-Khudaa Al-Khafeya	The Hidden Deception	Sami Wahdan, a journalist
1980	Al-Jaheem	Hell	Ramzi
1980	Shaaban Taht Al-Sefr	Shaaban Below Zero	Shaaban / Farid Al-Ghatrifi
1980	Ghawy Mashakel	Trouble Lover	Medhat
1980	Azkeyaa Laken Aghbeyaa	Smart but Foolish	Zaghloul Ezdahmed / Bahira
1980	Ragol Faqad Aqlo	A Man Who Lost His Mind	Zaki / Ziko
1981	Al-Mashbouh	The Suspect	Maher Sayed Aly
1981	Ummahat Fi Al-Manfa	Mothers in Exile	Hassouna
1981	Laylat Shitaa Dafia	A Warm Winter Night	Mamdouh Amin
1981	Al-Ensan Yaeesh Marra Wahda	The Human Lives Only Once	Hany Aly Sultan
1981	Entakhabu Al-Doctor Suleiman Abdel-Basset	Elect Dr. Suleiman Abdel-Basset	Dr. Suleiman Abdel-Basset
1982	Ala Bab Al-Wazir	At the Minister's Door	Kamal Abdel-Samad
1982	Esabet Hamada wa Tutu	Hamada and Tutu's Gang	Hamada Al-Zaftawy
1983	El Harrif	The Professional	Fares Bakr
1983	Al-Motasawel	The Beggar	Hasanin Al-Bartoushy
1983	El Avocato	The Advocate	Hasan Sabanekh
1983	Al-Ghoul	The Ghoul	Adel Issa
1983	Khamsa Bab	(title uncertain — possibly "Five Doors")	Mansour
1983	Wala Men Shaf Wala Men Dara	No One Saw, No One Knew	Morsi
1983	Antar Shayel Seifo	Antar, Carrying His Sword	Antar
1983	Hob Fi Al-Zinzana	Love in a Jail Cell	Salah Al-Gharbawy
1984	Hatta La-Yeteer Al-Dukhan	So that smoke won't fly	Fahmi Abdel-Hady
1984	Al Ins wa Algen	Humans and The Jinn	Jalal Sultan
1984	Meen Fina El-Harami	Which One of Us is the Thief?	Sherif / Hussein
1984	2 Ala Al-Tareeq	2 On the Road	Mamdouh
1984	Ehtares Men Al-Khat	Beware of the Line	Khosousi / Al-Khat Khalifa Al-Khat
1984	Wahda Be Wahda	One for One	Salah Fouad
1985	Al Halfout	(colloquial term, roughly "street hustler")	Arafa Mashawer
1985	Ramadan Fawq Al-Borkan	Ramadan Above the Volcano	Ramadan
1985	Zoug Taht Al-Talab	Husband on Demand	Mamdouh Fetiha
1985	Ana Elly Atalt Al-Hanash	I'm the One Who Killed the Snake	Hassanein
1985	Khally Balak Men Aqlak	Mind Your Mind	Wael
1987	Al-Nemr Wal-Ontha	The Tiger And The Female	Major Waheed
1989	Al-Mouled	The Mawlid (Festival)	Ibrahim (Hema) / Ghareeb / Barakat
1990	Jazeerat al-Shaytan	Devil's Island	Jalal
1990	Hanafy Al-Abbah	Hanafy Al-Abbah	Hanafy Al-Abbah
1991	Al-La'ib Ma'a Al-Kibar	Playing with the Big Boys	Hassan Behnasi Behloul
1991	Shams Elzanaty	Shams Elzanaty	Shams Elzanaty
1991	Musaggal Khatar	A Marked Man (habitual offender)	Sayed Kabaka
1992	El Erhab Wal Kabab	Terrorism and Kebab	Ahmed Fathallah
1993	El Mansy	The Forgotten	Youssef El Mansy
1994	Al-Erhabi	The Terrorist	Ali Abdel-Zaher (alias Mostafa Abdel-Rahman)
1995	Bekheet Wa Adeela	Bekheet And Adeela	Bekheet
1995	Toyoor Al-Zalaam	Birds Of Darkness	Fathy Nofal
1996	Al-Nom Fil-Assal	Sleeping In The Honey	Colonel Magdi Nour
1996	Bekheet Wa Adeela 2: El-Gardal wel-Kanaka	Bekheet and Adeela 2: The Pail and the Coffeepot	Bekheet
1998	Risala Ela Al-Wali	A Message to the Governor	Harfoosh Ben Barqouq Al-Rakabdar
1999	El-Wad Mahroos Betaa El-Wazeer	Mahroos; The Minister's Guy	Mahroos Matawe Al-Dokhakhny
2000	Bekheet Wa Adeela 3: Hello America	Bekheet And Adeela 3: Hello America	Bekheet Hanidak Al-Mohaitel
2002	Ameer Al-Thalaam	Prince of Darkness	Saeed Al-Masri
2003	Al-Tagroba Al-Danemarkeya	The Danish Experiment	Qadri Al-Manyawi
2004	Arees Menn Gehha Amneya	A Security Service Groom	Khattab Al-Naggari
2005	El-Sefara fi El-Omara	The Embassy Is In The Building	Sherif Khairy
2006	Emaret Yaqubian	The Yacoubian Building	Zaki Al-Dessouki
2007	Morgan Ahmad Morgan	Morgan Ahmad Morgan	Morgan Ahmad Morgan
2008	Hassan w Morqos	Hassan and Marcus	Boules / Hassan Al-Attar
2009	Bobbos	Bobbos	Mohsen Hendawi
2010	Zahaimar	Alzheimer's	Mahmoud Shoeib
2020	Omar Men Al-Bahga	A Lifetime of Joy	himself (archival footage)

=== Television ===
Year	TV Series in Arabic	Name Translation	Role
1964	Al-Manshet Al-Ahmar	The Red Headline	
1966	Sheikh Al-Hara	The Neighborhood Sheikh	
1968	Al-Wahm	The Illusion	
1969	Al-Fannan Wal-Handasa	The Artist and Engineering	Said
1969	Masyadat Al-Doctor Ghorab	Dr. Ghorab's Trap	
1970	Adam Wa Hawa Wal-Shaitan	Adam, Eve, and the Devil	Adam
1970	Al-Nashal	The Pickpocket	Salama
1971	Al-Naseeb	Fate	
1971	Meen Wala Meen	Which One	
1973	Al-Ragol Wal-Dokhan	The Man and the Smoke	Bisyouny
1978	Ahlam Al fata Al ta2r	Dreams Of The Fugitive Boy	Ibrahim El-Tayer
1978	Kayfa Takhsar Milyoun Guinea	How to Lose a Million Pounds	Hamza
1980	Dumu Fi Uyun Waqeha	Tears In Insolent Eyes	Gomaa Mahmoud Al-Shawan
2012	Firqit Naji Atallah	Naji Atallah's Team	Naji Atallah
2013	Al Aaraf	The Fortune-teller	Abd-El-Hamid El-Bakry / Hazem Ghorbal / Al-Brens / Mostafa Zahran / Araby El-Kahky / Sobhy Abou-El-Fadl / Abou-El-Haggag El-Masry / Shawky El-Mor / Mahmoud Salem
2014	Saheb El Saada	His Majesty	Bahgat Abou-Kheir
2015	Ostaz wa rayees kesm	Professor and Head of Department	Fawzy Gomaa
2016	Ma'amoon wa shorakaah	Ma'amoon and his partners	Ma'amoon Mobasher Abu El-Ata
2017	Afareet Adly Alam	Adly Alam's Ghosts	Adly Alam
2018	Awalem Khafyah	Hidden Worlds	Helal Kamel
2020	Valentino	Valentino	Noor Mohamed Ahmed Valentino

=== Plays ===
Year	Play in Arabic	Name Translation	Role
1960	Serri Gedan	Very Secret	
1963	Ana Wa Howa Wa Heya	Me, him and her	Dessouky
1965	Ana Feen W Enti Feen	Where am I and where are you?	Haikal
1966	Al-Nassabeen	Scammers	
1967	Dhat Al-Bijama Al-Hamraa	Red Pajamas	Hassan
1967	Halet Hob	A State of Love	Elham Al-Malfouf
1967	Hessa Qabl Al-Nawm	A Bedtime Lesson	
1970	Gharameyat Afifi		Khalifa
1971	Madrast Al-Mushaghebeen	The School of Mischievous	Bahgat Al-Abasiry
1975	Shahed Ma Shafsh Haga	The Witness Who Didn't See Anything	Sarhan Abdelbaseer
1975	Qesat Al-Hay Al-Gharby	The Story of the West Side	
1984	Al-Wad Sayed Al-Shaghal	The Boy Sayyed The Servant	Sayed Al-Kawawy
1993	Al-Zaeem	The Leader	Al-Zaeem (Zeinhom)
1999	Body Guard	Body Guard	Adham Al-Gabali

=== Radio ===
Year	In Arabic	Name Translation	Role
1972	Sabreen	Sabreen	
1973	Argouk La Tafhamny Bi Sur'a	Please Don't Understand Me So Quickly	Ahmed
1981	Ala Bab Al-Wazir	At the Minister's Door	Kamal
undated	Al-Ensan Yaeesh Marra Wahda	The Human Lives Only Once	
undated	Ta'aban Gedan	Very Tired	the psychiatrist

== Societal and humanitarian contributions ==
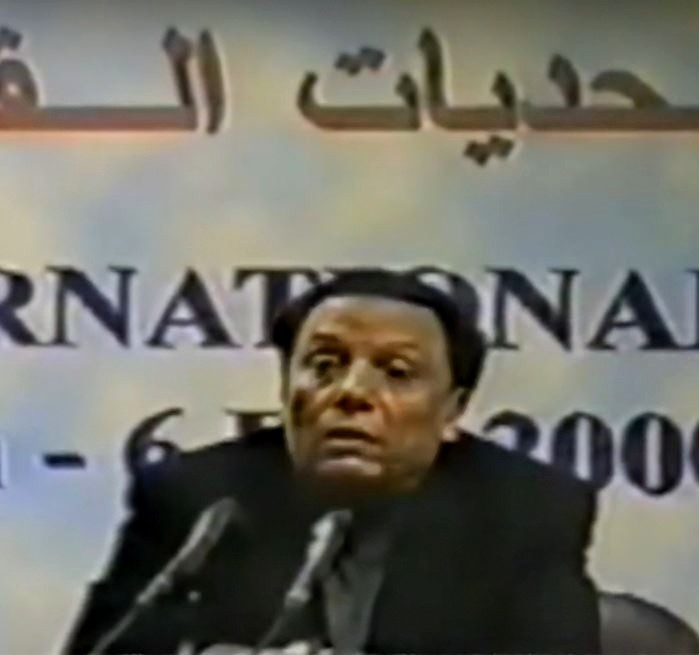
Adel Emam speaking at the Cairo International Book Fair in 2000.

Adel Emam has expressed support for political and social reform in Egypt. He supporteddemocratic principles and freedom of expression during periods of political upheaval. He has also supported charitable initiatives in healthcare and education like funding for hospitals and educational programs intended to assist disadvantaged communities.

Emam reportedly makes donations and provides assistance to people in need without publicizing his activities. He prefers to keep his charitable work private rather than attract media attention.

In 2000, Emam was appointed a Goodwill Ambassador for the United Nations High Commissioner for Refugees (UNHCR). In this role, he took part in campaigns and events to raise awareness of the circumstances of refugees and displaced people. Upon his appointment, Emam said:

In many of my films I fight against discrimination and raise awareness about poverty and social problems – issues that need to be addressed but which are often not discussed easily.

Emam's films have addressed political and social issues, including terrorism, sectarian violence and the Israeli–Palestinian conflict. His 1994 film The Terrorist focused on religious extremism. The film was later cited by Muhammad Kroum, a former member of an extremist group, as a reason for his assignment to assassinate Emam. Kroum said the film challenged jihadist movements by influencing young people.

Several actors have credited Emam with giving them opportunities early in their careers. He has also been described as offering guidance and helping actors obtain work and participate in productions. Randa Abu al-Azm, director of Al Arabiya's Egypt bureau, commented on Emam's career during an interview on Al-Hekaya with Amr Adib on MBC Masr: "We could produce twenty successful documentaries about Adel Emam."

== Legal challenges and controversies ==
In February 2012, Emam was sentenced (in absentia) to three months in jail for offending Islam. Emam said he would appeal the sentence. On September 12, 2012, Emam won his appeal when a Cairo misdemeanours court cleared him of defaming Islam in his films.

== Awards and honours ==
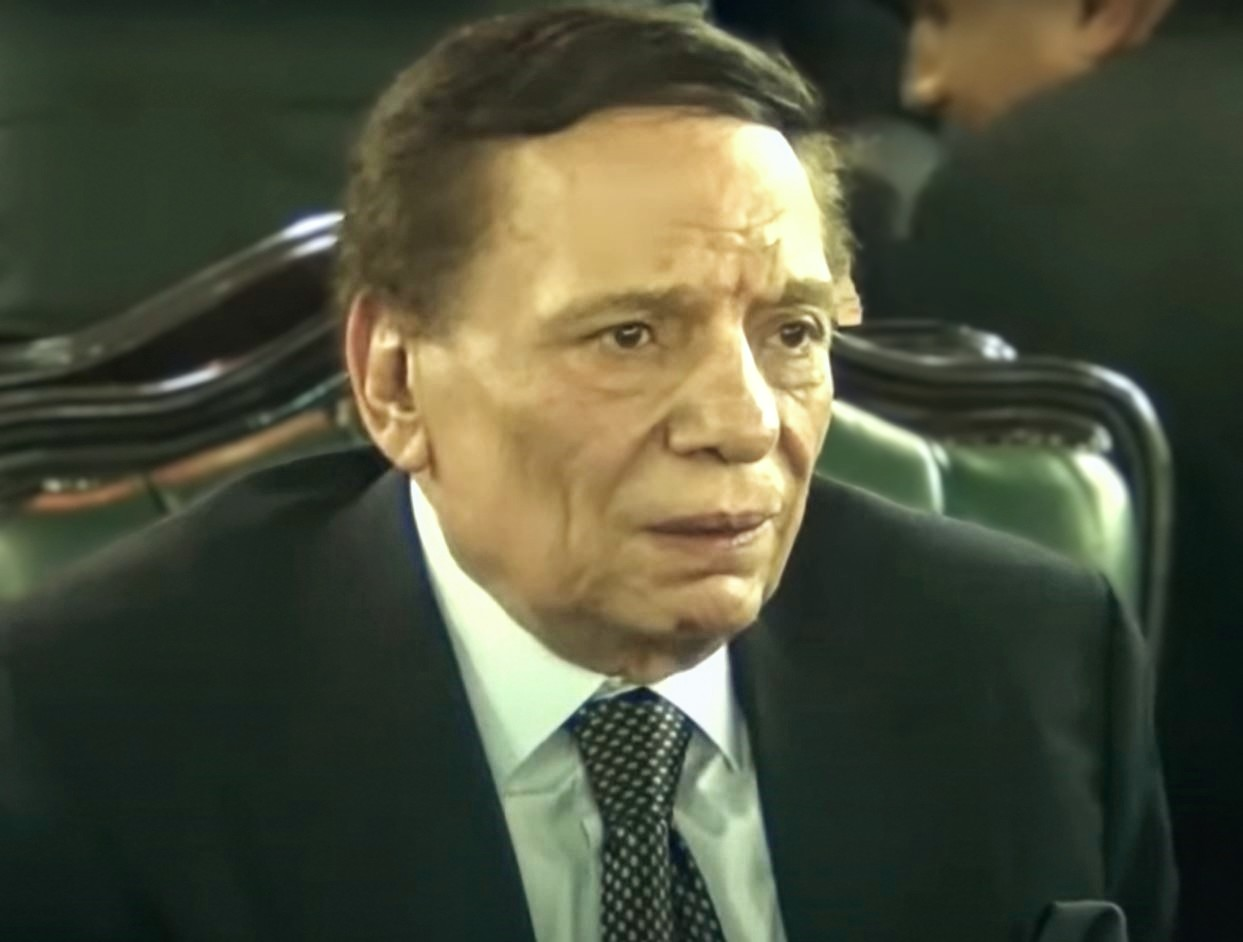
Adel Emam on December 3, 2015

Adel Emam has received numerous awards throughout his five-decade career. He won the Horus Award twice, for his leading roles in Omaret Yakobean and Al-irhabi, at the Cairo International Film Festival. Additionally, in 2014, a testament to his legacy he was honored with the Honorary Award at the Marrakech International Film Festival. His international acclaim continued as he received the International Jury Award at the São Paulo International Film Festival. Furthermore, in both 2005 and 2008, the Dubai International Film Festival awarded Adel Emam the Lifetime Achievement Award. In 2017, he was presented with the first-ever Career Achievement Award at the El-Gouna Film Festival. Most recently, in January 2024, he was honored with the Arab Art Leader Award at the Joy Awards.

=== Cairo International Film Festival ===
Year	Category	Nominated work	Result	Ref.
1995	Best Actor	Al-Irhabi (The Terrorist)	Won	
2007	Best Actor	Omaret Yakobean (The Yacoubian Building)	Won	

=== Dubai International Film Festival ===
Year	Category	Nominated work	Result	Ref.
2005	Lifetime Achievement Award	All his works	Won	
2008	Lifetime Achievement Award	All his works	Won	

=== El Gouna Film Festival ===
Year	Category	Nominated work	Result	Ref.
2017	Career Achievement Award	All his works	Won	

=== Joy Awards ===
Year	Category	Nominated work	Result	Ref.
2024	Arab Art Leader Award	All his works	Won	

=== Marrakech International Film Festival ===
Year	Category	Nominated work	Result	Ref.
2014	Honorary Award	Alzheimer's	Won	

=== São Paulo International Film Festival ===
Year	Category	Nominated work	Result	Ref.
2006	Best Actor	Omaret Yakobean (The Yacoubian Building)	Won	

=== Tribeca Film Festival ===
Year	Category	Nominated work	Result	Ref.
2006	Actor in a Narrative Feature	Omaret Yakobean (The Yacoubian Building)	Won	

=== Egyptian honours ===
- Commander of the Order of Merit

=== Foreign honours ===
- Knight (Achir) of the National Order of Merit (Algeria, 2002)
- Officer of the National Order of the Cedar (Lebanon, 2003)
- Commander of the Order of Intellectual Merit (Morocco, 1997)
- Grand Officier of the National Order of Merit of Tunisia (Tunisia, 2016)
