= List of Egyptian films of 1971 =

A list of films produced in Egypt in 1971. For an A-Z list of films currently on Wikipedia, see Category:Egyptian films.

Title	Director	Cast	Genre	Notes
El Khait El Rafeeh, الخيط الرفيع		Faten Hamama, Mahmoud Yassin	Drama	
El Qatala (The Killers)	Ashraf Fahmy	Salah Zulfikar, Nahed Sherif	Crime thriller	
My Wife and the Dog		Soad Hosny, Nour El-Sherif	Drama	
Thartharah fawqa al-Nīl (Adrift on the Nile)	Hussein Kamal	Mervat Amin, Emad Hamdy, Ahmed Ramzy, Adel Adham	Drama	
A Woman and a Man	Houssam Eddine Mostafa	Rushdy Abaza, Nahed Sherif	Drama	
Lamset Hanan (A Touch of Tenderness)	Helmy Rafla	Shadia, Salah Zulfikar	Romantic drama	
Aalem El Shohra	Muhammad Salman	Ferial Karim, Afif Chaya, Samir Chamas		
