= Magda El-Khatib =

Egyptian actress

- ماجدة الخطيب
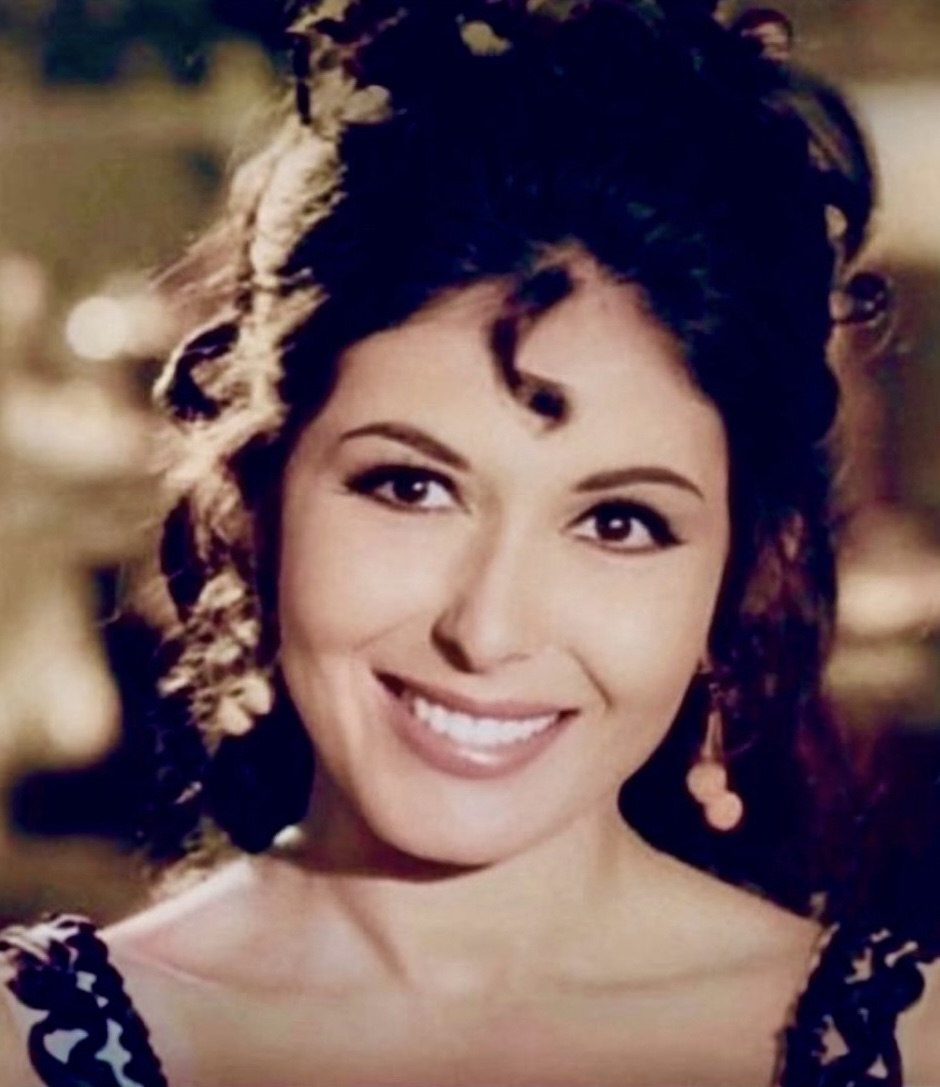
- Magda El-Khatib, 1969
- Born: Magda Mohamed Kamel El-Khatib; 2 October 1943; Cairo, Kingdom of Egypt
- Died: 16 October 2006 (aged 63); Cairo, Egypt
- Occupation: Actress • film producer
- Years active: 1960–2006
- Relatives: Zaki Rostom (Uncle)

Magda El-Khatib (Arabic: ماجدة الخطيب) was an Egyptian film, stage, television actress and film producer. She participated in over hundred artworks through her career. She was notable for her roles in the golden age of Egyptian cinema.

== Life and career ==
El-Khatib was born in Cairo. Her uncle is actor Zaki Rostom. She started her career with at the age of seventeen with a small role in Love and Pleasure (1960), followed by Melody of Happiness (1960). She acted in secondary roles before obtaining her first major role in The Mountain (1965) directed by Khalil Shawky and was chosen among the 100 best films in the history of Egyptian cinema in 1996.

Her first notable role was in Qasr El Shawk (1966) by Hassan El-Imam. Her notable film roles include Half an Hour of Marriage (1969) with Rushdy Abaza, Shadia, and Adel Emam. In 1970, she performed her first starring role in Hassan El-Imam's Dalal, the Egyptian which was her career breakthrough and placed among leading actors, and qualified her to perform starring roles in other films, including; A Furnished Apartment (1970), The Game of Each Day (1971), and Something in My Chest (1971). She starred in Chitchat on the Nile (1971) by Hussein Kamal, based on Naguib Mahfouz's story with the same name the film was a critical and financial success. Followed by Some People Live Twice (1971). In 1972, she starred in Imtithal by Hassan El-Imam. The film was a success. El-Khatib produced and starred in Visitor at Dawn in 1973, the film criticized the Nasserist era. In 1974 she produced the light comedy In Summer We Must Love (1974) starring Salah Zulfikar, with whom she co-starred in Roadless Traveler (1978).

In the 1980s, She co-starred in Youssef Chahine's An Egyptian Story (1982), followed by a leading role in El Awamma 70 (1982) alongside Ahmed Zaki. She starred in The Cursed House (1987) alongside Kamal El-Shennawi. She participated in a number of television works such as The Butterfly, Zizinia, The Edge of a Knife, and A Woman from Upper Egypt. Her last acting scene was in the series No One Sleeps in Alexandria. El-Khatib has participated in more than 55 films in her career. She won the Golden Pyramid Acting Award in 1966 for her performance in Dalal the Egyptian. She also received the Best Actress Award for a second role in Tufahha (1996). Her last work was the television miniseries To The End of the World, starring Nelly Karim.

In 1982, El-Khatib was sentenced with a suspended one year in prison for manslaughter after hitting a pedestrian with her car. She was imprisoned in 1985 as a result of a drug related case in which she was involved, and was beaten by the police during her arrest. She was in Greece when she was sentenced, she stayed in Greece and returned in the 1990s. She returned to acting in the mid-1990s in secondary roles.

In 2006, she suffered from severe pneumonia and was transferred to a hospital. It was discovered that she had kidney failure and was placed on a respirator until she died at the age of 63.

== Filmography ==
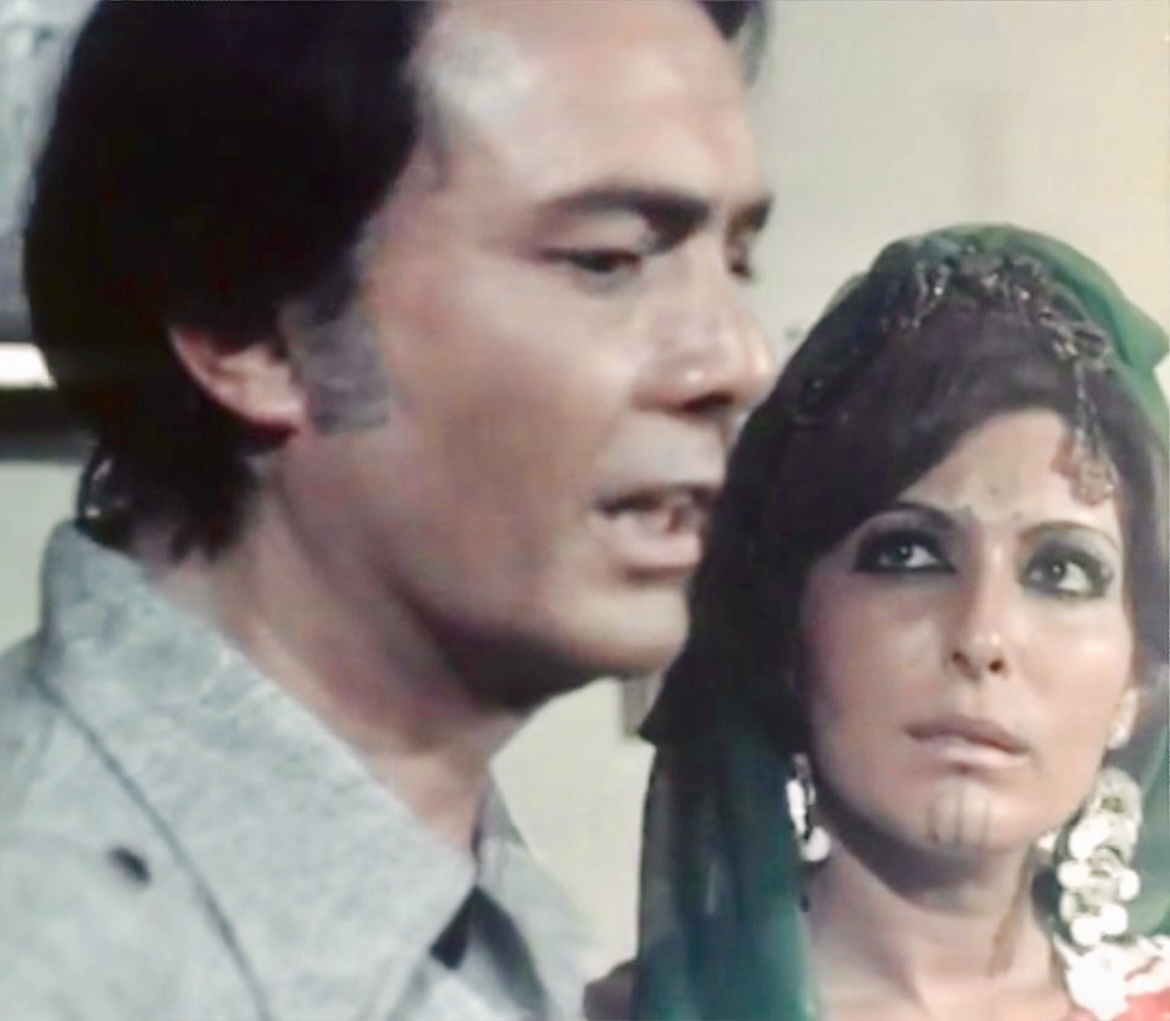
Magda El-Khatib with Salah Zulfikar in Roadless Traveler (1978)

- 1959: Love and Pleasure
- 1960: Melody of Happiness
- 1960: Albanat walsayfu
- 1962: Baqaya eadhra'
- 1965: Alrijal la yatazawajun aljamilati
- 1965: The Mountain
- 1966: Qasr alshawq
- 1966: al'asdiqa' althalathatu
- 1967: measkar albanati
- 1967: shantat hamza
- 1967: bayt altaalibat
- 1968: qindil 'am hashimi
- 1968: bint min albanati
- 1968: alast alnaazirata
- 1969: Half an Hour of Marriage
- 1970: A Place Beside the Devil
- 1970: A Furnished Apartment
- 1970: A Wife for five Men
- 1970: Dalal, the Egyptian
- 1971: Something in My Chest
- 1971: Chitchat on the Nile
- 1971: Some People Live Twice
- 1971: The Game of Each Day
- 1972: sur mamnueatun
- 1972: Imtithal
- 1972: The Quiet City
- 1973: masaat alduktur husni
- 1973: shaqat lilhubi
- 1973: Visitor at Dawn
- 1973: A Woman from Cairo
- 1974: In Summer We Must Love
- 1974: eajayib ya ziman
- 1974: alshawarie alkhalfia
- 1974: al'ahdan aldaafiati
- 1975: majaanin bialwiratha
- 1975: alhub that almutri
- 1975: ahtarsi min alrijal ya mama
- 1976: Tawheeda
- 1976: 'akhawatuh albanati
- 1977: Mouths and Rabbits
- 1977: 13 Lies and a lie
- 1978: Roadless Traveler
- 1980: Tomorrow is my Revenge
- 1980: Always My Lover
- 1980: tahqiq
- 1980: Al Mutaham
- 1981: hakamat almahkama
- 1981: Umahat fi almanfaa
- 1982: An Egyptian Story
- 1982: Al Awwama 70
- 1982: Aleaskariu shibrawi
- 1983: Mamlakat alhalwasa
- 1984: Please Give this Medicine
- 1986: Aawriat nasi allayl
- 1986: Alhurub min alkhanka
- 1986: Abin tahiat eazuza
- 1987: The Cursed House
- 1987: Alaintifada
- 1988: Almar'at walqanun
- 1996: Ya dunya ya ghrami
- 1997: halq hush
- 1997: Tofahha
- 1997: El Batal
- 1997: Iithr hadith 'alim
- 1998: Mujrim mae martabat alsharafi
- 1998: Our Blessed Aunt
- 1998: El Qatl El Lazeez
- 2000: Wahayat qalbi wa'afrahuh
- 2000: Sahar 'afriqiun
- 2001: nahb eishat alhuriyati
- 2001: Skut hansur
- 2003: Min nazrat eayn
- 2004: Alexandria... New York
- 2005: Khali min alkulistruli
- 2005: Hamada Plays
- 2005: Banat wust Albalad
- 2005: Raya wa Sekina
- 2005: Ahlam eumarna
- 2006: Haneen
- 2006: Awdet El Nadla
- 2006: Special Relationships
- 2006: Real Dreams
- 2006: To the End of the World
