= Frances Liardet =

Writer and translator of Arabic literature

Frances E. Liardet (born 10 December 1962) is a writer and translator of Arabic literature. She studied creative writing at the University of East Anglia. She has translated several book-length works, including two books by the modernist Egyptian writer Edwar al-Kharrat and one by Nobel Prize winner Naguib Mahfouz.

Liardet's first novel, The Game, was chosen as one of the winners of Betty Trask Award in 1994. Her second novel, We Must Be Brave, was published in 2019. She published Think of Me in 2022.

== Translations ==
- City of Saffron by Edwar al-Kharrat (1989)
- Down to the Sea by Gamil Atia Ibrahim (1991)
- Girls of Alexandria by Edwar al-Kharrat (1993)
- Adrift on the Nile by Naguib Mahfouz (1993)

== See also ==
- List of Arabic-English translators
