= Chitchat on the Nile =

Chitchat on the Nile (Adrift on the Nile)
- Directed by: Hussein Kamal
- Screenplay by: Mamdouh El-Laithy
- Story by: Naguib Mahfouz
- Based on: Adrift on the Nile
- Produced by: Gamal El-Laithy
- Starring: Ahmed Ramzy; Magda El-Khatib; Emad Hamdy; Adel Adham; Mervat Amin; Suhair Ramzi; Neamat Mokhtar
- Cinematography: Mostapha Emam
- Edited by: Rashida Abdel Salam
- Music by: Ali Ismael
- Production company: Gamal El-Laithy Films
- Distributed by: Gamal El-Laithy Films
- Release date: November 15, 1971 (Egypt)
- Running time: 122 minutes
- Country: Egypt
- Language: Egyptian Arabic

Chitchat on the Nile (Arabic: ثرثرة فوق النيل) (Adrift on the Nile) is a 1971 film based on the 1966 novel Adrift on the Nile by Egyptian Nobel Laureate Naguib Mahfouz. It is directed by Hussein Kamal and stars Ahmed Ramzy, Magda El-Khatib, Emad Hamdy, Adel Adham, Mervat Amin, Soheir Ramzi and Naemat Mokhtar. The film is a member in Top 100 Egyptian films list.

== Plot ==
The film addresses the decadence of Egyptian society during the Gamal Abdel Nasser era.

It tells the story of a simple Egyptian civil servant, Anis (played by Emad Hamdi), who cannot tolerate the hypocrisy of the Egyptian government (for whom he works at the Ministry of Health) and the illiteracy of the Egyptian public and decides to hide from all the problems in the country by taking up smoking hashish in a shisha, a popular smoking habit in Egypt, to escape from reality.

Anis (who used to work as a teacher) meets with an old student, Ragab (actor Ahmed Ramzy), by chance. Ragab invites him to the small boat in the Nile. And Anis discovers soon enough that he is not the only person who smokes shisha but a bunch of other elite, middle class and low class people are all on the boat. He soon discovers that everyone is smoking to forget the reality and hypocrisy of Egyptian life.

== Crew ==
- Directed by: Hussein Kamal
- Story by: Naguib Mahfouz
- Screenplay by: Mamdouh El-Laithy
- Based on: Adrift on the Nile
- Producer: Gamal El-Laithy
- Production Studio: Gamal El-Laithy Films
- Distribution: Gamal El-Laithy Films
- Cinematograpy: Mustafa Emam
- Music by: Ali Ismael
- Edited by: Rashida Abdel Salam

== Cast ==
- Ahmed Ramzy as Ragab El-Qady
- Emad Hamdy as Anees Zaki
- Magda El-Khatib as Samara Bahgat
- Adel Adham as Ali El Sayed
- Mervat Amin as Sanaa
- Sohair Ramzi as Laila Zidan
- Neamat Mokhtar as Sania Kamel
- Ahmed Tawfik as Mostafa Rashed
- Salah Nazmi as Khaled Azzooz
- Ahmed El-Gezeiry as Abdo
- Magdy Wahba as Mohamed Bahgat
- Aida El Shaer as Singer

== Political background ==
The film was released during the era of the government of Anwar Al Sadat and was quickly removed from the market because it was seen as a criticism of the Nasser period, when films that did not conform with Nasser's politics and ideology were often suppressed. Anwar al-Sadat did not want to upset the Egyptian people, some of whom still loved and respected Nasser.

The films deals frankly with the issue of drug addiction, as well as the decadence that obtained during the late Nasser era. The film was produced in 1971, and was unsuccessful financially, as it was frequently banned in the Middle East and also in the West (mainly Europe). It only gained acclaim 35 years later. It is still banned in many countries, especially in the Arab world.

The film is now distributed by Founoon and is subtitled in French and English.

== See also ==
- Egyptian cinema
- List of Egyptian films of 1971
