= Streets of Fire (Egyptian film) =

- شوارع من نار
- Directed by: Samir Seif
- Written by: Ahmed Saleh; Ibrahim al-Mougi (screenplay and dialogue)
- Produced by: Wassef Fayez
- Starring: Nour El-Sherif; Madiha Kamel; Laila Elwi; Sayed Zayan; Mohamed Reda
- Cinematography: Issam Farid
- Edited by: Salwa Bakr
- Music by: Baligh Hamdi
- Production company: Studio Misr
- Release date: 12 March 1984
- Running time: 120 minutes
- Country: Egypt
- Language: Arabic

Streets of Fire (Arabic: شوارع من نار, transliterated as Shawera men nar) is an Egyptian film released on 12 March 1984. The film is directed by Samir Seif and features a screenplay adapted from the film Irma La Douce, directed by Billy Wilder. It stars Nour El-Sherif and Madiha Kamel.

== Cast ==
- Nour El-Sherif (Imam al-Sayyid al-Masry)
- Madiha Kamel (Nafisa Imran/Nousa)
- Laila Elwi (Ensaf Imran)
- Sayed Zayan (Jalal)
- Mohamed Reda (Sayyid al-Masry)
- Nagah el-Mogui (Qarni)
- Naima al-Saghir (Pedroon)
- Karima Sharif (Basima)
- Omaima Selim (Gamalat)
- Zakariya Mowafi (Al-Usul)
- Ahmed Abu Obeya (Al-Tamraji/Al-Barman)
- Hanem Muhammad (Mother of Imam al-Sayyid al-Masry)
- Qassem el-Daly (Awaden)
- Sharifa Zeitoun (Aziza)

== Plot ==
In the 1940s, a policeman named Imam al-Sayyid al-Masry moves from Ismailia to Cairo to work in the red-light district. He falls in love with a prostitute named Nousa, who works for a pimp named Jalal, without knowing her profession. Imam defends her from a British soldier who blocks her path in the street and assaults her, thereby losing his place on the police force after a trial. Thus out of work, Imam returns to the neighborhood to search for work, ultimately becoming a pimp himself and winning a turf war with Jalal. Imam becomes a neighborhood magistrate, abolishes prostitution in the district, turns his brothel into a nightclub, and joins the guerrillas resisting British occupation.

== Production ==
The film is based on the 1963 film Irma la Douce, starring Jack Lemmon and Shirley MacLaine and directed by Billy Wilder.

The plot is very similar to that of Hossam El Din Mostafa's 1983 film Route of Passion, starring Madiha Kamel, Yousra, Mahmoud Abdel Aziz, Ahmed Zaki, and Farouk al-Fishawy. A lawsuit dogged the producer of that film, which wound up delayed in the courts for a year. Producer Wassef Fayez took advantage of the opportunity and made a toned-down version of the same story. When Streets of Fire was a success, producer Mohamed Mokhtar shot a 1984 version entitled Five Door Joint, which was directed by Nader Galal and starred Nadia Al-Gindi and Adel Emam.
