= The Game of Each Day =

- Arabic: لعبة كل يوم
- Directed by: Khalil Shawki
- Written by: Ahmed Lotfy (story, scenario, and dialogue); Abdel Majid Abu Zaid; Abdel-Kader Telmissany (scenario and dialogue)
- Starring: Magda El-Khatib; Abdel Moneim Ibrahim; Taheyya Kariokka; Nabila Ebeid; Abdel Moneim Madbouly; Ezzat El Alaili; Madeiha Hamdy; Mohamed Reda
- Cinematography: Diaa el-Din el-Mahdy
- Edited by: Kamal Abul Ela
- Music by: Ali Ismael; Mohamed El-Mougy
- Production company: General Egyptian Cinema Organization
- Release date: August 2, 1971
- Running time: 110 minutes
- Country: Egypt
- Language: Arabic

The Game of Each Day (Arabic: لعبة كل يوم, transliterated as Leighbat kol yawm) is an Egyptian film released on August 2, 1971. The film is directed by Khalil Shawki, features a screenplay by Ahmed Lotfy with help from Abdel Majid Abu Zaid and Abdel-Kader Telmissany on scenario and dialogue, and stars Magda El-Khatib, Nabila Ebeid, Taheyya Kariokka, Ezzat El Alaili, and Abdel Moneim Ibrahim. The plot features a taxi service worker named Shabara who falls in love with a woman named Anshirah but incurs the jealousy of a man named Ibrahim, who plots to keep them apart.

== Cast ==
- Nabila Ebeid (Anshirah)
- Magda El-Khatib (Latafa, a fortune teller)
- Taheyya Kariokka (Anshirah’s mother, a koshary vendor)
- Abdel Moneim Ibrahim (Shabara al-Afi, attendant at a local taxi garage)
- Ezzat El Alaili (Aino, a foreman)
- Mohamed Reda (Ibrahim, a café owner)
- Abdel Moneim Madbouly (Abbas Efendi)
- Madeiha Hamdy (Fakina, Ibrahim’s daughter)
- Gamal Ismail (Sergeant Amin)
- Saeed Saleh
- Aziza Helmy
- Shafik Noureddin
- Abdel Salam Mohamed
- Abdel Ghani Nagdi
- Seif Allah Mokhtar
- Abdelmoneim Bassiouni
- Mohamed Abu Hashish
- Omran Bahr

== Songs ==
The songs are sung by Mohamed al-Ezaby. They feature melodies by Mohamed El-Mougy and Ali Ismael. Numbers include “جمل الأحمال” (“Camel Loads”), “نوادر” (“Stories”), “أمانة يا دنيا” (“Some Honesty, Everyone”), “في بطني جرح يا طبيب” (“Doctor, I’ve Got a Heartache”), and “لما نوينا على السفر” (“Why Do We Wander?”). There is also a mawwal by El-Mougy entitled “بستان حبيبي” (“Darling Garden”).

== Synopsis ==
Shabara al-Afi (Abdel Moneim Ibrahim) is an itinerant young man who doesn’t know his origins or family. Wherever he lays his hat is his home, and his latest gig is at a taxi garage in Desouk in the Kafr El Sheikh Governorate. Usually he takes passengers to Birinbal, but he searches earnestly for income to pay rent and marry his beloved Anshirah (Nabila Ebeid).

Many live in Shabara’s neighborhood, mostly struggling to make ends meet in odd jobs. Some have been living there for a while and accumulated property, especially Ibrahim (Mohamed Reda), a stable man-about-town. Ibrahim’s daughter Fakina (Madeiha Hamdy) falls in love with Ibrahim’s foreman Aino (Ezzat El Alaili), who refuses to marry her. Meanwhile, women vie for Ibrahim’s love, including Anshirah’s koshary-selling mother (Taheyya Kariokka) and the fortune teller Latafa (Magda El-Khatib), but he oppresses his workers. Shabara comes to Ibrahim to haggle over the price koshary but soon finds work as a hawker and taxi-washer, though Ibrahim cheats him on pay. Ibrahim interacts with many characters at the market as he woos Anshirah and is wooed by her mother, including an old man named Abdul Kafi as well as Abbas Effendi (Abdel Moneim Madbouly), a legal eagle conspiring with Ibrahim as an accomplice.

== Reception ==
Film critic Mahmoud Kassem wrote of the film in an article for Al-Shorouk:

There was [in the post-revolutionary period] a wave of films about low-paid day laborers without a future, such as Cairo Station, The Sin, and The Rain Has Gone Dry. Shabara’s life struggles lead him to make a thousand accounts for the repo men to seize the lot’s stolen goods and drive them to the police stations until the fines are paid. The neighborhood is threatened in the prospect, including Anshirah and her mother. When the repo men come for the farm belonging to Anshirah’s mother, Shabara escapes on a koshary cart. In one of the most memorable scenes in Egyptian cinema, he hides the cart behind tall crops until the men leave, earning Anshirah’s love in the process. After his arrest, she supports him in jail...These people will not achieve anything in life even if they find a protector, and as we can see, the traumas in their lives are more powerful than any moments of pleasure. Some will continue to migrate in perpetuity, like Shabara dreaming of wearing clothes that aren’t second-hand. The young Khalaf, with no family like the protagonist of Hector Malot’s Nobody’s Boy, shadows Shabara as a surrogate father. There are many side plots, including that of old Abdul Kafi, who recalls his memories of participating as a young man in the Egyptian Revolution of 1919, standing against brute force without us knowing his roots like dozens of the film’s characters…What we would ask in summation is: Why does such a film not rank higher in the pantheon of Egyptian cinema?
