= A Deal with a Woman =

- صفقة مع امرأة
- Directed by: Adel El Aassar; Gamal El Damaty (assistant director)
- Written by: Muhammad Bashandi
- Starring: Madiha Kamel; Hussein Fahmy; Adel Adham; Zizi Mustafa
- Production company: Al-Aassar Films
- Release date: 11 February 1985
- Running time: 100 minutes
- Country: Egypt
- Language: Arabic

A Deal with a Woman (Arabic: صفقة مع امرأة transliterated as Safqa Maa Imraa) is an Egyptian film released on 11 February 1985. The film is directed by Adel El Aassar and stars Madiha Kamel, Hussein Fahmy, and Adel Adham.

== Synopsis ==
Najwa, the wife of a rich man, attends therapy sessions with a psychiatrist named Sherif, who holds a forged doctorate from Essam, who in turn is using it to blackmail him. Essam and Najwa plot to kill her husband and frame Sherif. Sherif hears her confess in therapy to hiding her husband's body after killing him. Najwa falls in love with Sherif, to the consternation of the jealous Essam.

== Cast ==
- Madiha Kamel (Najwa)
- Hussein Fahmy (Sherif)
- Adel Adham (Essam)
- Zizi Mustafa (Atiyat Mohamed)
- Ismail Abdelmajid (Abdel Azim)
- Thuraya Ezz El Din (Mona)
