= Hussein Kamel =

Hussein Kamel (Arabic: حسين كامل) may refer to:

- Hussein Kamel of Egypt (1853–1917), Sultan of Egypt
- Hussein Kamel al-Majid (1954–1996), Iraqi general and son-in-law of Saddam Hussein

== See also ==
- Hussein Kamal (حسين كمال)
