= Madbouly =

Madbouly (Arabic: مدبولي) is a surname. Notable people with the surname include:

- Abdel Moneim Madbouly (1921–2006), Egyptian actor, comedian and playwright
- Ahmed Madbouly (born 1994), Egyptian footballer
- Mostafa Madbouly (born 1966), Egyptian politician
