= Streets of Fire (disambiguation) =

Streets of Fire is a 1984 American film directed by Walter Hill.

Streets of Fire may also refer to:

- Streets of Fire (Duncan Browne album)
- Streets of Fire (Place Vendome album)
- "Streets of Fire", a song by Bruce Springsteen from Darkness on the Edge of Town
- "Streets of Fire", a song by The New Pornographers from Twin Cinema, originally by Destroyer from We'll Build Them a Golden Bridge
- Streets of Fire (Egyptian film), a 1984 Egyptian film
- "Streets of Fire (Arrow)", twenty-second episode of the second season of Arrow
