= Mahmoud el-Gendy =

Egyptian actor (born 1945)

Mahmoud Hussein El-Gendy
- محمود حسين الجندي
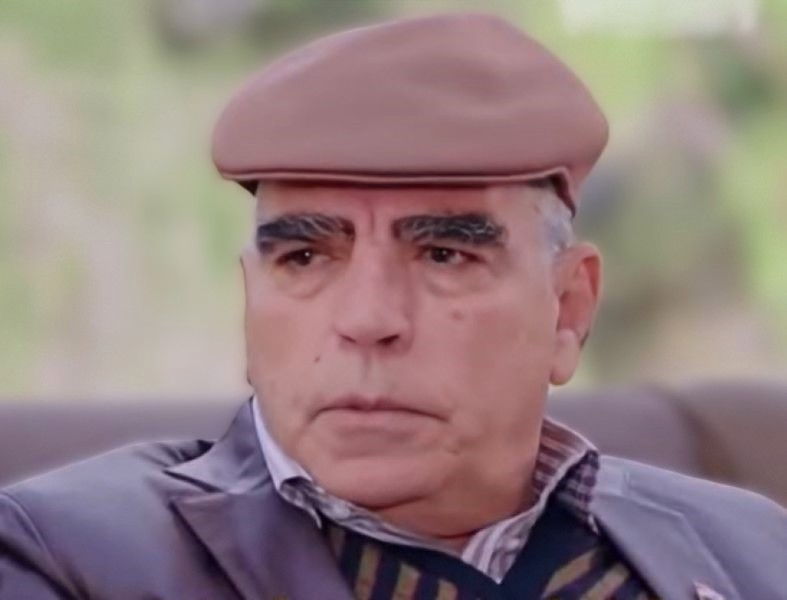
- Born: Mahmoud Hussein El-Gendy; February 24, 1945; Abu Al-Matamir, Beheira Governorate, Egypt
- Died: April 11, 2019 (aged 74); 6th of October, Egypt
- Burial place: Abu Al-Matamir, Egypt
- Education: Higher Institute of Cinema
- Occupation: Actor
- Years active: 1960–2019
- Notable work: "Monsieur le Directeur," "Shams Al-Zanati," "Al-La'ib Ma'a Al-Kibar," "The Family of Mr Shalash," "The Last Return"
- Spouses: Doha Hassan (m. 1972; died 2001); Abla Kamel (m. 2003; div. 2005)

Mahmoud Al-Jundi or Mahmoud El-Gendy (Arabic: محمود الجندي, his full name is Mahmoud Hussein El-Gendy Arabic: محمود حسين الجندي, February 24, 1945 – April 11 2019), was an Egyptian actor and singer. He was born in Abu Al-Matamir Center in Beheira Governorate. He graduated from the Higher Institute of Cinema, and his artistic career began in the 1970s, during which he appeared in numerous films, series, and plays.

In addition to his acting, Mahmoud was known for his melodious voice and ability to sing mawwals, incorporating musical segments into many of his works. In 1990, he released a music album titled "The Poor Artist," but he later revealed that he ventured into singing without pursuing it as a long-term career.

He was also known for his melodious voice and singing mawwals, incorporating musical segments into many of his works. In 1990, he released a music album titled "The Poor Artist," though he revealed that he ventured into singing but chose not to pursue it further.

Mahmoud Al-Jundi also participated in the October War of 1973, serving in the Egyptian Air Force for seven years, where he earned multiple honors. He died on April 11, 2019, due to a heart attack.

== Early life ==
He was born in Beheira, in the Abu Al-Matamir Center, on February 24, 1945. He studied at the Industrial School, graduating from the Textile Department, and worked in a factory before enrolling at the Higher Institute of Cinema. Mahmoud El-Gendy kept his intention to join the institute hidden from his father, only revealing it after passing the admissions stage. To his surprise, his father supported him and accompanied him to submit his documents.

He graduated in 1967, and after graduation, he joined the Egyptian Armed Forces as a conscript for 7 years in the Air Force, where he participated in the October War, After the war, he returned to acting.

== Personal life ==
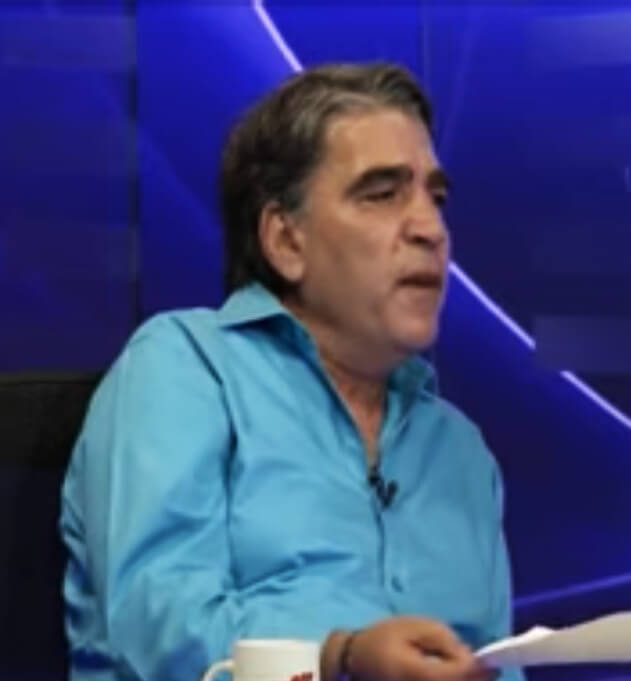
El-Gendy in a television interview on May 7, 2014.

Mahmoud El-Gendy married early in his life to "Doha Hassan," who was outside the artistic community, and they had four children: three daughters, Rehab, Rabab, and Rana, and a son, the director Ahmed Al-Jundi. Their marriage lasted until she died in 2001 due to a fire in their house. At the time of her death, he was also married to another woman, with whom he had a daughter named "Maryam." In 2003, he married actress Abla Kamel, but their marriage ended in separation in 2005. He later married his fourth wife, "Hiyam," the daughter of artist Gamal Ismail.

He recounted the experience, stating: "The two incidents—first the fire and prior to that, the death of Mustafa Metwalli—caused me to recognize that life is but fleeting. I questioned myself, what have I accomplished? Am I proceeding rightly or wrongly? However, it was not merely the incident that led me to return to faith. While I was attempting to extinguish the fire, I gazed at my library and noticed that the books and newspapers I had written about were burning. Yet, the section containing the atheist literature seemed to burn in a manner that appeared defiant, and I realized it was a divine message. At that moment, I uttered, 'I am content with whatever God ordains.'" He also mentioned that, during his youth, he was influenced by "the arrogance of youth" and the ideologies of Communism and the "decline of religious discourse," which, according to him, seemed less aligned with the contemporary era.

During an interview with Mona el-Shazly, he shared that he had founded a theatrical troupe in his hometown, Abu Al-Matamir, to nurture young talent and impart the artistic expertise he had accumulated throughout his illustrious career. He described it as "the greatest project I have undertaken" and declared it to be "the true investment."

== Artistic career ==
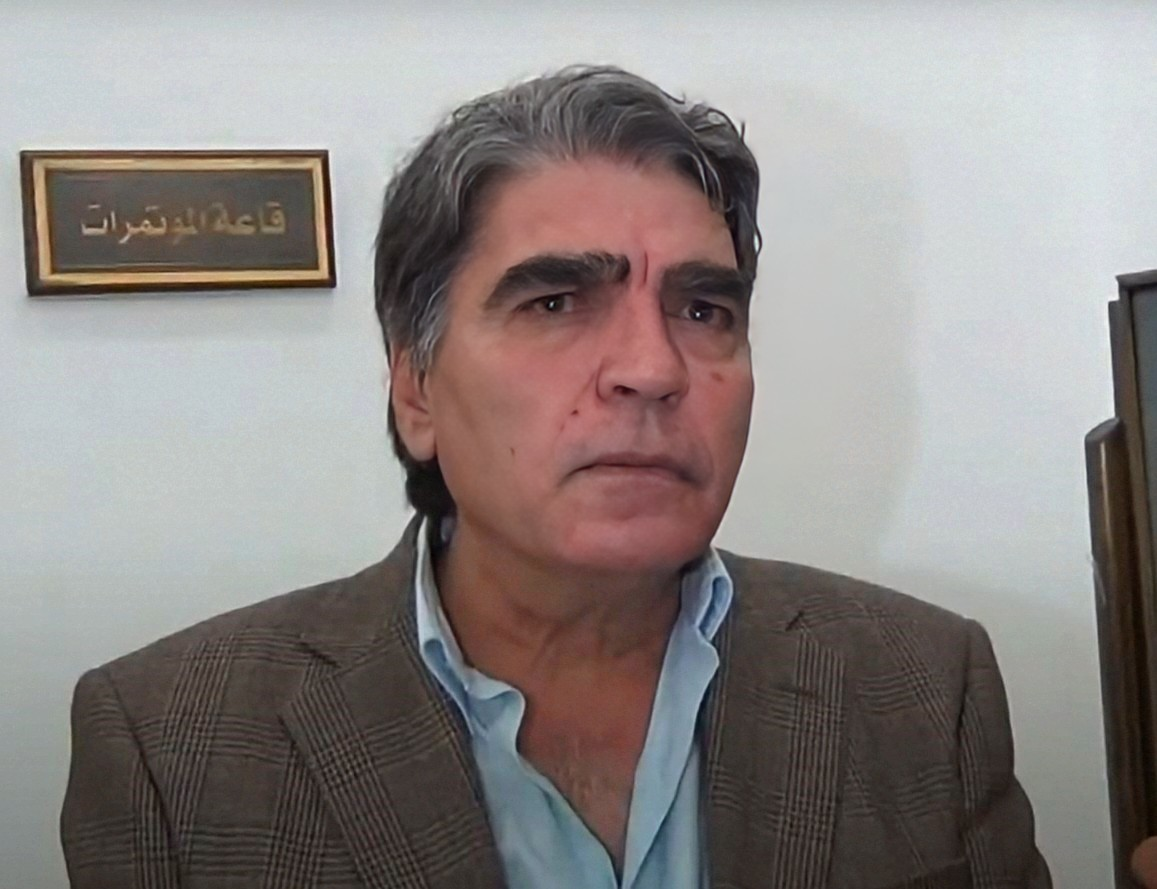
Mahmoud El-Gendy on 20 Nov 2013.

He started acting with small roles in several TV series and plays, but his breakthrough came in 1979 when he acted in the play "It's Really a Respectable Family" with Fouad el-Mohandes, followed by the TV series "Tears in Eyes of the Blind" with Adel Emam. Later, he appeared strongly in the TV series "Honey and Tears", where he played both the father and son roles. He participated in many cinematic and television works, and some of his prominent TV series include "The Family of Mr Shalash" with Salah Zulfikar, "Abla Hikmet's Conscience" with Faten Hamama, and "The Last Return" with Salah Zulfikar. Among his notable films are "The Boss Manager", "Sun of Al-Zanaty", and "Playing with the Big Ones". In 1990, he released a music album titled "Poor Artist," and in 2017, he decided to retire, but later returned to participate in numerous TV series, theatrical works, and films.

Throughout his artistic career, Al-Jundi presented 34 theatrical performances and starred in 109 films. His television presence was equally strong, with notable roles in series like "Al-Mal wal-Banun" (1992) and "Al-Rahaya" (2001). In the theater, Mahmoud El-Gendy showed himself through his ability to perform multifaceted roles. Beyond his acting skills, El-Gendy was known for choosing roles that addressed the realities of Egyptian society, tackling social issues with nuance.

In 2017, he shocked his audience when he decided to retire, feeling that "the atmosphere in the artistic field does not respect art and artists," as he stated in an interview at that time. However, the Actors Syndicate intervened through its president, Ashraf Zaki, who "convinced El-Gendy to return once again."

== Filmography ==
=== Films ===
Mahmoud El-Gendy had a prolific cinematic career, contributing to over 100 films across multiple decades. Some of his most notable works include:

==== 1970s and 1980s ====
Year	Name	Role
1977	Uncle Zizo Habibi (Uncle Zizo, My Love)	Sports commentator
1978	El-Kelma El-Akhera (The Last Word)	
1978	Shafika we Metwally (Shafika and Metwally)	
1979	El-Maghnawaty (The Singer)	
1982	El-Akdar El-Damya (Bloody Fates)	
1982	Hadouta Masreya (An Egyptian Tale)	
1983	Ana’eeb Al-Damm (The Curse of Blood)	Fouad
1984	Ghababara Al-Mina (The Titans of the Port)	
1984	Ne’olak Wala Teza’lash (Shall We Tell You or Not?)	
1985	El-Toofan (The Flood)	Yousef
1986	El-Fareesa (The Prey)	
1986	El-Tout wel Naboot (The Mulberry and the Stick)	Diaa Al-Naji
1986	Madame Shallata	Munir
1986	El-Banat wel Maghoul (The Girls and the Unknown)	Qais
1988	El-Osta El-Modeer (The Boss Manager)	

==== 1990s ====
In the 1990s, El-Gendy continued his streak with films like:

Year	Name	Role
1991	Noor Al Oyoun (Light of the Eyes)	
1991	Shams Al Zanati	Salama Al Tefshan
1991	Shahatin and Nobles	
1991	Al-La'ib Ma'a Al-Kibar (Playing with the Big Boys)	Ali Al-Zahhar
1992	Hikayat Al-Gharib (Tales of the Stranger)	Abdul Rahman
1992	A Date with the Wolves (Maw'id Ma'a Al-Dhi’āb)	Adel
1992	Naji Al-Ali	The Drunken Man
1993	Tahqiq Maa Muwatena (Investigation with a Citizen)	Journalist Hamdi
1993	Siraa’ Al-Hasna’wat (Conflict of Beauties)	Hussein
1993	Awlad Durgam (Durgam's Sons)	Salah
1993	Tareeq Al-Shaytan (The Devil's Path)	Doctor Sherif
1994	Kart Ahmar (Red Card)	Adel Ezz El-Din
1994	Darab El-Awalem (The Lane of Experts)	Abbas
1994	Ged’aan Al-Helmiya (The Heroes of Helmiya)	Mustafa
1994	El-Millionaire Al-Sa’louk (The Pauper Millionaire)	
1995	Klab Al-Madina (The City's Dogs)	
1997	El-Liss Al-Mohtaram (The Noble Thief)	
1998	Al-Ghaybuba (Coma)	

Even in the last decade, he remained active and delivered memorable performances in films such as:

Year	Name	Role
2008	Ala Ganb Ya Osta (Step Aside, Driver)	Sheikh – Soul
2010	Asafeer El-Neel (The Nile Birds)	Mohamed Ahmed Othman
2010	Samir, Shahir and Bahir	Munir Al-Khatir (guest of honor)
2012	Sa’a w Nos (An Hour and a Half)	
2014	Al-Harb Al-‘Alamiyya Al-Thalitha (World War III)	Mansour Abu Khamis
2016	Min 30 Saneh (From Thirty Years)	Ibrahim
2016	Kalb Baladi (Local Dog)	Mosque Servant
2017	Huroob Edterary (Forced Escape)	Mohamed Othman, Youssef's father
2017	El-Qird Beytkalem (The Monkey Talks)	
2018	El-Tayara (The Plane)	

=== Theater ===
In addition to his film success, El-Gendy had an extensive career in theater. He appeared in many iconic plays, including:

- Bahebak Ya Mogrem (I Love You, Criminal)
- Set El-7osn (The Lady of Beauty)
- El-Malleem Be Arba’a (The Penny for Four)
- Zawag El-Banat (The Marriage of Girls)
- Asfour A’qlu Tar (A Bird Lost His Mind)
- Alashan Khater Oyoonak (For the Sake of Your Eyes)
- Eftah El-Mahdar (Open the Report)
- El-Prinsessa (The Princess)
- Innaha Haqqan A’ela Mohtarama (It’s Truly a Respectable Family)
- Madraset El Moshaghbeen (The School of Mischief), where he famously replaced Ahmed Zaki.

=== Television ===
El-Gendy's contributions to drama were equally significant, with appearances in over 200 television series starting in the 1970s and continuing until his passing. His final series, Hekayti (My Story), was completed shortly before his death and aired during Ramadan.

Notable series include:

- El-Hob Aqwa (Love is Stronger)
- Abu El-Qasim El-Tanboury wa Ikhwanoh (Abu El-Qasim El-Tanboury and His Brothers)
- Aish Ayamak (Live Your Days)
- Ayb Ya Doktor (Shame on You, Doctor)
- El-Nas fi Kafr Askar (The People of Kafr Askar)
- Hassanein Madandesh

His legacy as a versatile artist remains unmatched in the history of Egyptian entertainment.

== Death ==
On 11 April 2019, he died at the age of 74 in Cairo after his health deteriorated.
