= Real Dreams =

2007 film

Ahlam Haqiqeya
- أفيش الفيلم
- Directed by: Mohamed Gomaa
- Written by: Mohamed Diab
- Starring: Hanan Tork; Khaled Saleh; Dalia El Behairy; Fathy abdel wahab Magda El-Khatib
- Cinematography: Nezar Shaker
- Edited by: Ahmed Shahm
- Music by: Tamer Karawan
- Release date: 12 October 2007 (Cairo)
- Country: Egypt
- Language: Arabic

Real Dreams (Arabic: احلام حقيقيه) is an Egyptian thriller film produced in 2007 starring Hanan Tork, Khaled Saleh. The protagonist, Mariam, is living a troubled life with her husband Ahmed. Suddenly, her life turns upside down when she starts having dreams of crimes that she discovers real on the next morning. Thinking she's the one who commits them while sleeping, she decides to stay awake.

== Cast ==
- Hanan Tork - Mariam
- Khaled Saleh
- Dalia El Behairy
- Fathy abdel wahab
- Magda El-Khatib
