= Jala Fahmy =

Egyptian actress (1962–2022)

- جالا فهمي
- Born: Cairo, Egypt
- Occupation: Actress
- Father: Ashraf Fahmy

Jala Fahmi (Arabic: جالا فهمي; 1962 – 2022) was an Egyptian actress.

== Biography ==
Jala Fahmi was born on 6 November 1962, in Cairo, Egypt. In 1986, she graduated from the Faculty Of Arts Cairo University. She started her career by her appearance on the television program, The Solution is the Rope. After that, she appeared in some films in small roles such as A Bad Day and a Good Day. She had significant roles in films such as Pizza Pizza (1989), Execution of a Judge (1990), Keid El-Awalem (1991), El Helaly's Fist (1991), Suspicious Connections (1996), Jala Jala (2001), The First Time You Fall in Love (2003). Fahmi worked on radio and television.

She died on 26 February 2022.

== Filmography ==
=== Films ===
- 2003: The First Time You Fall in Love
- 2001: Jala Jala
- 1998: Pizza Pizza
- 1996: Suspicious Connections
- 1995: Ta'Ta' wa Reeka wa Kazem Bey
- 1994: Jeans
- 1992: Girls In Trouble
- 1992: Al Hob Fi Taba
- 1991: El Helaly's Fist
- 1991: Keid El-Awalem
- 1990: Execution of a Judge
- 1988: Youm Mor We Youm Helw

=== Series ===
- 1995: Layaly El Helmeya
- 1990: El Weseyya
