= A Woman of Fire =

- Directed by: Reda Mayser
- Written by: Reda Mayser; Mohsen Al-Sameraay
- Starring: Salah Zulfikar; Nahed Yousri
- Cinematography: Youssef Antar
- Edited by: Reda Mayser
- Production companies: Qablawi Films; Zalat
- Distributed by: Amal Film
- Release dates: 1 January 1971 (Beirut, Lebanon)
- Running time: 83 minutes
- Countries: Syria; Egypt
- Language: Egyptian Arabic

A Woman of Fire (Arabic: امرأة من نار, French: femme de feu, translit: Imra' Min Nar or EMRA'A MEN NAR) is a 1971 film starring Salah Zulfikar and Nahed Yousri. It is written and directed by Reda Mayser.

== Synopsis ==
Ahmed Lotfi is being chased by a group of people in Istanbul, but a girl named Turkan Abdel Hamid saves him from them. It turns out that she knew him, and a person named Shawkat told him that the reason for the chase was related to his brother Farid, who was being held by the Falcon Gang.

== Crew ==
- Writer: Reda Mayser
- Director: Reda Mayser
- Produced by: Qablawi Films – Zalat
- Distribution: Amal Film
- Cinematographer: Youssef Antar
- Editor: Reda Mayser

== Cast ==
=== Primary cast ===
- Salah Zulfikar in the role of Ahmed Lotfi
- Nahed Yousri in the role of Nazik/Turkan
- Ziyad Mawlawi in the role of Ziyad
- Adeeb Qaddoura in the role of Fahd

=== Supporting cast ===
- Muhammad Khair Halawani
- Adnan Ajlouni
- George Amber
- Reza Al-Tayyar
- Uba Al-Halabi
- Mohamed Gomaa

== See also ==
- Egyptian cinema
- Cinema of Syria
- Arab cinema
- List of Syrian films
- Salah Zulfikar filmography
