= Nahed Yousri =

Egyptian actress

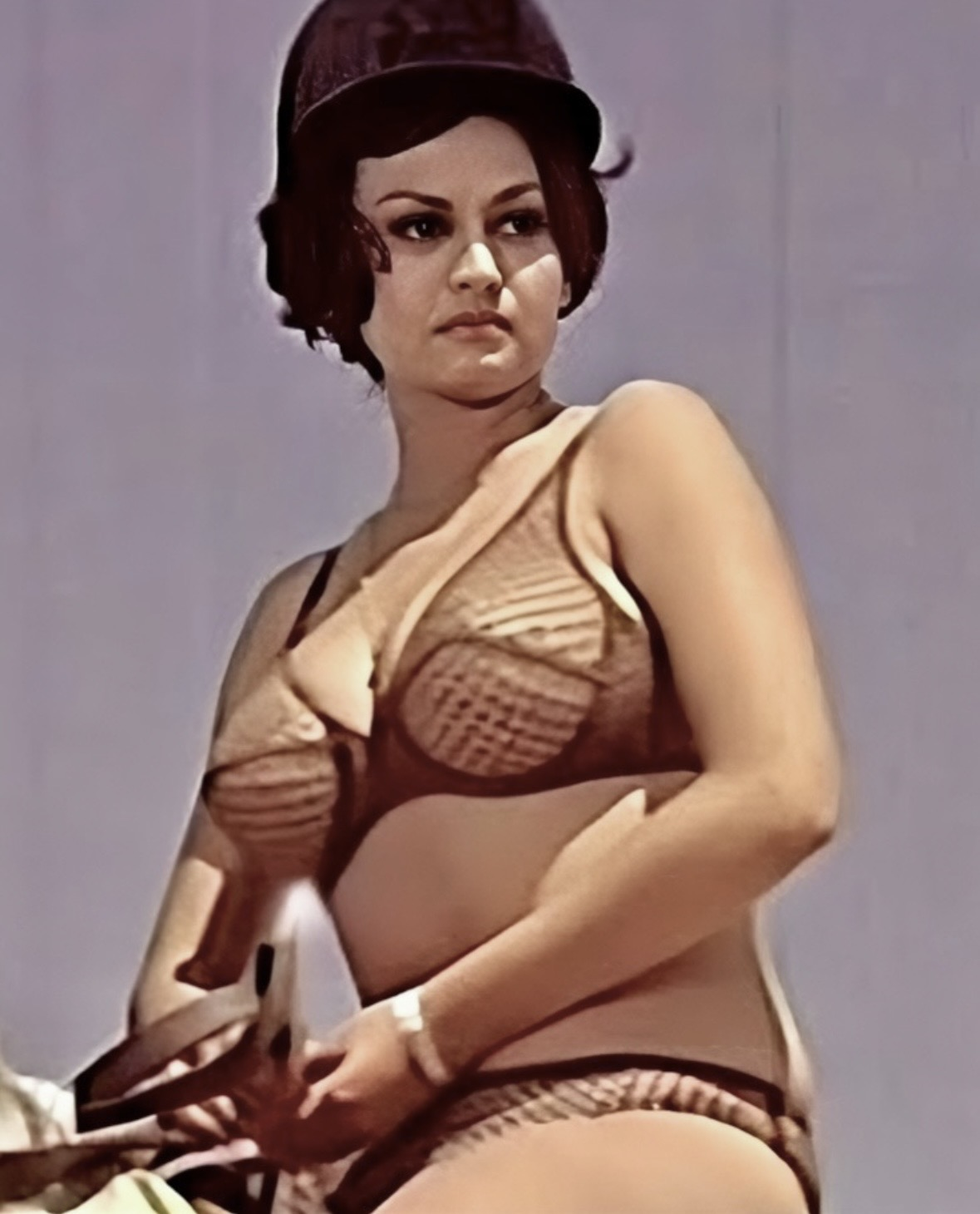
- Born: Nahed Hassan Shukri; May 10, 1949 (age 77); Egypt
- Occupation: Actress
- Years active: 1965–1990

Nahed Yousri (Arabic: ناهد يسري), also romanised as Nahied Yousri (born 10 May 1949) is an Egyptian actress.

== Biography ==
Born Nahed Hassan Shukri (ناهد حسن شكري), she followed her sister Samia Shukri and made her first appearance in cinema by 1965. Following a prolific career, her ground-breaking role came with The Lady of the Black Moons (1971). Also A Woman of Fire (1971) was a commercial hit and was followed by a number of other Lebanese films that often featured her in erotic contexts. In mid-1980s, she acted in various Egyptian TV series. Her retirement was with Yasin Ismail Yasin's 1990 film Disappeared Wife (إختفاء زوجة).
