= In Summer We Must Love =

1974 Egyptian film

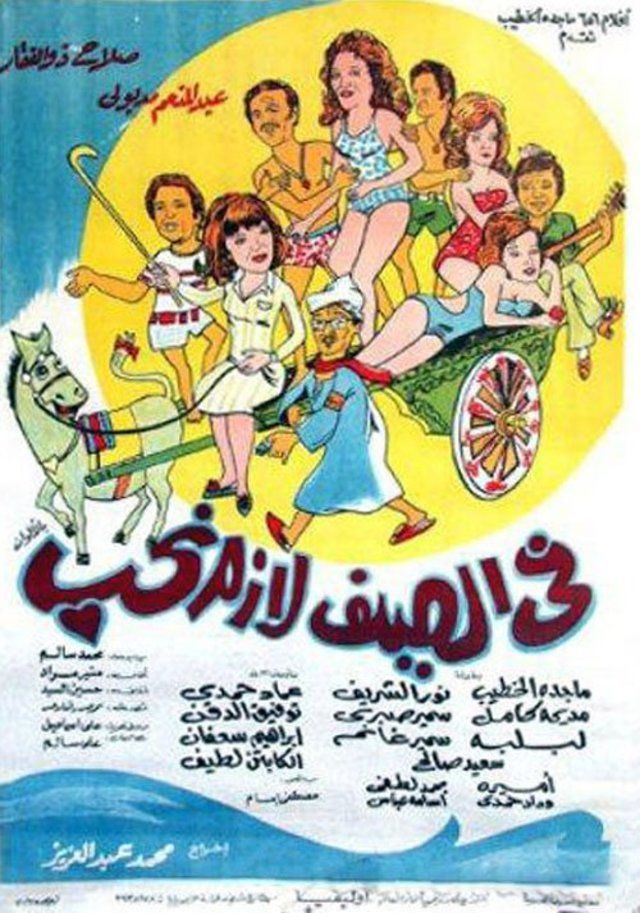
- Theatrical release poster
- في الصيف لازم نحب
- Directed by: Mohamed Abdel Aziz
- Written by: Mohamed Hassan; Salama Hassan; Mohamed Salem; Ali Salem
- Produced by: Magda El-Khatib
- Starring: Salah Zulfikar
- Cinematography: Moustafa Emam
- Edited by: Rachida Abdel Salam
- Production company: 656 Films
- Distributed by: El Gaaouny Distribution Agency
- Release date: 19 August 1974
- Running time: 105 minutes
- Country: Egypt
- Language: Egyptian Arabic

In Summer We Must Love (Arabic: في الصيف لازم نحب, translit: Fi Saif Lazem Nihib or Fil Seef Lazem Neheb) is 1974 Egyptian comedy film directed by Mohamed Abdel Aziz. It stars Salah Zulfikar as Dr. Nabil, the psychiatrist. The film features an ensemble cast that includes Nour El-Sherif, Abdel Moneim Madbouly, Samir Ghanem, Lebleba, Magda El-Khatib and Emad Hamdy. In Summer We Must Love was produced by Magda El-Khatib for 656 Films and was released on August 19, 1974 by El Gaaouny Distribution Agency.

== Plot ==
Dr. Nabil, a psychiatrist and his orderly take four male patients to a beach resort in Alexandria to help them integrate into the society and overcome their mental illnesses. The four patients meet their new soul mates. Three of the girls are with their very old fashioned and strict father, but finally love combines between every young man and woman, and they agree to get married. This summer trip and love helped Dr. Nabil to treat his patients and cure them from their illness.

== Main cast ==
- Salah Zulfikar as Dr. Nabil
- Nour El-Sherif as Ahmed
- Samir Ghanem as Geneidy
- Abdel Moneim Madbouly as Abdel Hafeez
- Lebleba as Rawya
- Magda El-Khatib as Nadia
- Madiha Kamel as Madiha
- Osama Abbas as Hassan
- Emad Hamdy as Hospital director
- Samir Sabri as Medhat
- Saeed Saleh as Osama
- Mohamed Lotfy as Mohammed
