= Hussein Fahmy =

Egyptian actor

Hussein Bilal Fahmy
- حسين فهمي
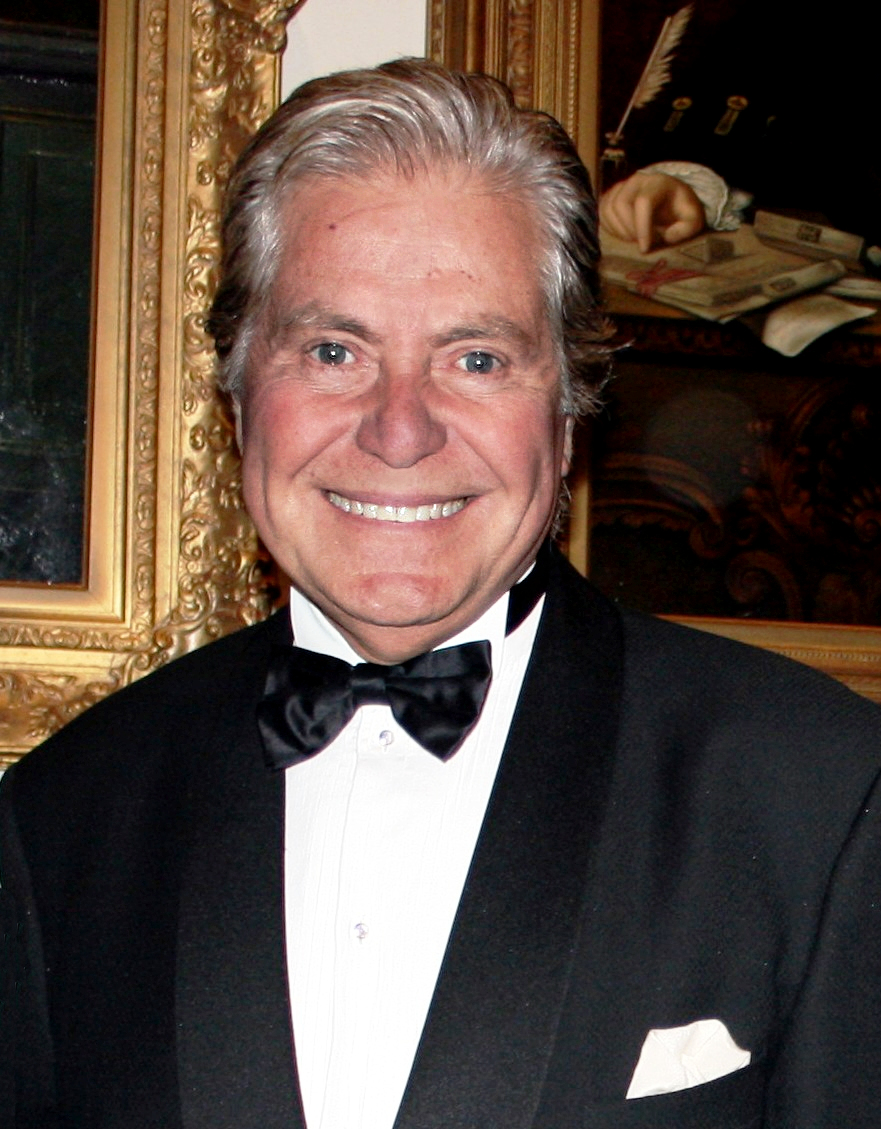
- Fahmy in 2008
- Born: Hussein Mahmoud Fahmy; 22 March 1940 (age 86); Cairo, Egypt
- Education: University of California, Los Angeles (MFA)
- Occupation: Actor
- Years active: 1963–present
- Children: 5
- Relatives: Mustafa Fahmy (brother) Hassan Fahmy (brother)

Hussein Mahmoud Fahmy (Arabic: حسين فهمي; born 22 March 1940) is an Egyptian actor. He worked in the film and television industry for more than 50 years, specializing in film directing and appearing in over 100 film, television, and theatre productions.

He graduated from UCLA with a Master of Fine Arts (MFA) degree. Academically he continued to teach at the Academy of Arts (film institute) for twelve years. A leading movie star and the first UNDP Regional Goodwill Ambassador for the Arab States in 1998, Hussein Fahmy is noted for his humanitarian effort. He has worked hard to convey to his audience in the Middle East important human development issues. His contract ended before the Lebanese situation in 2006.

== Early life and career ==
In March 2007, Fahmy was named the first Special Olympics Ambassador for the Middle East North Africa Region. In this role, he will work to create awareness and encourage all members of the community to be involved in the movement.

He was also appointed the President of the Cairo International Film Festival (1998–2001). In 2006, he hosted a television show, for the first time in his show business career, Elnas wa Ana aired on the Egyptian television and el-Hayah channel.

== Filmography ==
Hussein Fahmy has starred in 112 films throughout his career, from his debut in 1963 to the present.

Year	Title	Arabic Title
1963	Alley of the Pestle	
1970	Fire of Longing	(a.k.a. Nar El'Shoaq)
1970	Dalaal the Egyptian	(a.k.a. Dalaal El'Masreyya)
1971	Queen of Night	(a.k.a. Malleket El'Leil)
1971	My Beautiful Teacher	(a.k.a. Modarressati Al'Hasnaa)
1971	The Lady of the Black Moons	(a.k.a. Sayyedat Al'Aqmaar Al'Sawdaa)
1972	Watch Out for Zouzou	(a.k.a. Khalli Ballak Men Zuzu)
1972	Love and Pride	(a.k.a. Hobb Wa Kebriyya)
1972	Badeea's Daughter	(a.k.a. Bent Badeea)
1973	Strangers	(a.k.a. Ghorabaa)
1973	The Soul Lover	(a.k.a. Aashiq Al-Roah)
1973	Wild Roses	(a.k.a. Zohoor Bariyya)
1973	My Blood, My Tears, and My Smile	(a.k.a. Dammi Wa Domooie Wa Ebtessamati)
1974	A Woman in Love	(a.k.a. Emraa Aashiqa)
1974	The Fugitive	(a.k.a. Al'Haareb)
1974	The Bullet is Still in My Pocket	(a.k.a. Al'Rossassa La Tazaal Fi Gaybi)
1974	The Enemy Brothers	(a.k.a. Al'Okhwa Al'Aadaa)
1974	Ameera, My Love	(a.k.a. Ameera Hobbi Ana)
1974	Best Days of My Life	(a.k.a. Agmal Ayyam Hayati)
1975	Forgive Me, God	(a.k.a. Ya Rabb Tobah)
1975	The Guilty	(a.k.a. Al'Mozneboon)
1975	A Melody in My Life	(a.k.a. Nagham Fi Hayati)
1975	Who Can Beat Azeeza	(a.k.a. Meen Yeqdar Ala Azeeza)
1976	Women in Press	(a.k.a. Nessaa Taht El-Tabbe)
1976	The After Love	(a.k.a. Ma Baad Al'Hobb)
1976	Viva Zalata (As Billy The Kid)	
1976	No Time for Tears	(a.k.a. La Waqt Lel'Domoo)
1976	A Bachelor's Affairs	(a.k.a. Gharamiyyat Aazeb)
1976	Longing	(a.k.a. Shoaq)
1976	Wise Fate	(a.k.a. Hekmetak Ya Rabb)
1976	The Gorgeous and the Pauper	(a.k.a. Al'Fattena Wal'Sollook)
1976	Hot Tears	(a.k.a. Al'Domoo Al'Sakhina)
1976	Waves With No Shore	(a.k.a. Amwaag Bela Shatea)
1977	Women in the City	(a.k.a. Nessaa Fil'Madeena)
1977	Night and Desire	(a.k.a. Layl Wa Raghba)
1977	Sweet Love World	(a.k.a. Helwa Ya Donya El'Hobb)
1977	Barefooted on the Golden Bridge	(a.k.a. Hafeya Ala Gesr Al'Zahab)
1977	Love Mania	(a.k.a. Gonoon Al'Hobb)
1977	Look What Sokkar Is Doing	(a.k.a. Boss Shoof Sokkar Bettemel Eih)
1977	The Devils	(a.k.a. Al'Shayateen)
1977	Love in Deadend	(a.k.a. Al'Hobb Fi Tareeq Masdood)
1977	Thousand Kiss and Kiss	(a.k.a. Alf Bossah We Bossah)
1978	Love May Kill	(a.k.a. Wa Menn Al'Hobb Ma Qatal)
1978	The After Midnight Phone Call	(a.k.a. Mokallamat Baad Montassaf Al'Layl)
1978	Yasmeen's Nights	(a.k.a. Layali Yasmeen)
1978	Lovers Avenue	(a.k.a. Sekket El'Ashqeen)
1978	Love on Top of Volcano	(a.k.a. Hobb Fawq Al'Borkaan)
1978	Woman is Woman	(a.k.a. Al'Maraa Heya Al'Maraa)
1978	Masters and Slaves	(a.k.a. Asyaad Wa Abeed)
1978	Sweetest Days of Life	(a.k.a. Ahla Ayyam Al'Omr)
1979	West District Story	(a.k.a. Qessat Al'Hayy Al'Gharbi)
1979	Men Who Don't Know Love	(a.k.a. Regaal La Yarifoon Al'Hobb)
1979	Let Me Revenge	(a.k.a. Da'ooni Antaqqem )
1979	Sin of An Angel	(a.k.a. Khatee'at Malaak)
1979	Deceived By A Woman	(a.k.a. Khadaatni Emraa)
1979	Save This Family	(a.k.a. Anqizu Hazihi Al'Aaela )
1980	The Night the Moon Cried	(a.k.a. Layla Baka Fiha Al'Qamar)
1980	Sinless Tears	(a.k.a. Domooa Bela Khataya)
1980	Challenge of the Tough	(a.k.a. Tahaddi Al'Aqweyaa)
1980	Bondless Woman	(a.k.a. Emraa Bela Qayd)
1980	Watch Out, Gentlemen	(a.k.a. Entabbeho Ayyoha Al'Sadah)
1981	Goodbye Suffering	(a.k.a. Wadaan Lel'Azaab)
1981	Who Crazes Whom?	(a.k.a. Meen Yegannen Meen)
1981	A Dinner Date	(a.k.a. Mawed Ala Al'Ashaa)
1981	A Moment of Weakness	(a.k.a. Lahzet Daaf)
1981	Fight of the Lovers	(a.k.a. Seraa Al'Oshaaq)
1981	Horror Trip	(a.k.a. Rehlat Al'Roab)
1981	Shark	(a.k.a. El'Ersh)
1982	My Love Was Lost There	(a.k.a. Wa Daa Hobbi Honaak)
1982	Nights	(a.k.a. Layali)
1982	The Shine of Your Eyes	(a.k.a. Bareeq Aynaykee)
1982	The Last Word	(a.k.a. Al'Kallema Al'Akheera)
1982	The Shame	(a.k.a. Al'Aar)
1982	Collapse	(a.k.a. Enheyaar)
1983	Dog Bite	(a.k.a. Addet Kalb)
1983	Kingdom of Hallucination	(a.k.a. Mamlaket Al-Halwassa)
1983	Dog Bite	(a.k.a. Addet Kalb)
1983	Babelshereyya Strongmen	(a.k.a. Gedaan Babelshereyya)
1983	God is Watching	(a.k.a. Enna Rabbaka Labell-Mersad)
1983	Tanneries Fences	(a.k.a. Aswar El'Madabegh)
1984	The Hounds	(a.k.a. Kelab Al'Herassa)
1984	Sea of Illusions	(a.k.a. Bahr Al'Awham)
1984	The Crooks	(a.k.a. El'Nassabeen)
1984	Legal Wins	(a.k.a. El'Halal Yeksab)
1984	The Prince	(a.k.a. El'Berrins)
1985	A Deal with a Woman	(a.k.a. Safqa Maa Emraa)
1985	A Devil of Honey	(a.k.a. Shaytan Men Assal)
1985	Honey of the Queen	(a.k.a. Shahd El'Malleka)
1985	Rescuing the Rescuable	(a.k.a. Enqaz Ma Yomken Enqazoh)
1986	Before Farewell	(a.k.a. Qabl Al'Wadaa)
1986	Desire, Spite, and Revenge	(a.k.a. Raghba wa Heqd wa Entiqam)
1986	A Mutinous Woman	(a.k.a. Imraa Motamarreda)
1986	The Inheritors	(a.k.a. Al'Waratha)
1986	The Female	(a.k.a. Al'Ontha)
1986	Oh My Homeland	(a.k.a. Ah Ya Balad)
1987	Big Guys Game	(a.k.a. Lebet El'Kobar)
1987	Animal Running	(a.k.a. Garii El'Wohoosh)
1987	Players	(a.k.a. El'Laeeba)
1988	This Wedding Can't Be Done	(a.k.a. El'Gawaza Di Mesh Lazim Tettem)
1989	The Suicide of a High School Teacher	(a.k.a. Entehaar Modarres Sanawi)
1990	Alexandria Again and Again	(a.k.a. Eskendereyya Kaman we Kaman)
1991	Dangerous Game	(a.k.a. Al-La'ib Ma'a Al-Kibar)
1992	My Wife and the Wolf	(a.k.a. Zawgati wal'Zeab)
1992	The Bloody Meeting	(a.k.a.Al'Leqaa Al'Dami)
1992	Prisoner 67	(a.k.a. Al'Sagueena 67)
1992	The Revolving Stone	(a.k.a. Al'Hagar Al'Dayer)
1993	Criminal Case 85	(a.k.a. 85 Genayat)
1994	The Women Market	(a.k.a. Sooq Al'Nesaa)
1994	Hekmat Fahmy	
1995	Hazelnut Peels	(a.k.a. Qeshr Al'Bondoq)
1998	The Disappearance of Gaafar Al'Masry	(a.k.a. Ekhtefaa Gaafar Al'Masry)
2000	Anbar and the Colours	(a.k.a. Anbar wal'Alwan)
2000	Children of the Devil	(a.k.a. Abnaa Al'Shaytan)
2001	Lovers' Paperclips	(a.k.a. Qasaqees Al'Oshaq)

== See also ==
- List of Egyptians
