= Our Blessed Aunt =

- ست الستات
- Directed by: Raafat el-Mehi
- Written by: Raafat el-Mehi
- Produced by: Raafat el-Mehi; Ayman al-Arab
- Starring: Laila Elwi; Maged el-Masry; Magda El-Khatib
- Cinematography: Ayman Abu el-Makarem
- Edited by: Ahmed Daoud
- Music by: Fathi al-Khamisi
- Production company: Studio 13
- Release date: June 29, 1998
- Running time: 123 minutes
- Country: Egypt
- Language: Arabic

Our Blessed Aunt (Arabic: ست الستات, transliterated as Sett al-Settat) is an Egyptian comedy, drama film released on June 29, 1998. The film is directed and written by Raafat el-Mehi and stars Laila Elwi, Maged el-Masry, and Magda El-Khatib. The story concerns a young Abdelaziz, who returns to Cairo from another unspecified Arab country. Coming back to his aunt Fakiha's apartment, he discovers that it has become a brothel run by a madam who denies that she is related to him.

== Cast ==
- Laila Elwi (Lola)
- Maged el-Masry (Abdelaziz)
- Hassan Hosny (Hassan el-Demerdash)
- Magda El-Khatib (Basant Abdel-Al/Fakiha al-Sharnoubi/Sitt al-Satat)
- Entessar (Zeinab/Dudu)
- Ali Hassanein (Mamoun Hafez)
- Mukhles al-Buhairi (Major General Azzouz)
- Saeed al-Saleh (Fawzy, a paralegal)
- Ahmed Rizk (Hamada, a soldier)
- Abdulrahim El-Tanir (minister)
- Mohaja Abdelrahman (Sheikha Hosina)
- Diaa Abdel Khalek (taxi driver)
- Nashat Talaat
- Ahmed Saeed
- Najah Fahim
- Iman Wahba
- Youssef Abdelmaqsoud
- Hazem Fouad
- Laila Abdelhakim
- Hazem Mamdouh
- Jihan Wehbe
- Laila Helmy
- Moushira
- Azza Fouad
- Ismat Kamal
- Ahmed Samir
- Rasha Fouad
- Ahmed Bahloul

== Synopsis ==
The comedy's protagonist Abdelaziz (Maged el-Masry) returns to Cairo after working in another unnamed Arab country. Going to the apartment of his aunt Fakiha (Magda el-Khatib), he discovers that it has become a brothel. Lola (Laila Elwi), one of the prostitutes there, tries to convince him to marry her. He has them make the place a pension, but they carry on their old profession anyway. Everyone is arrested, and Abdelaziz discovers a big surprise.

== Legacy ==
Critic Nisreen al-Rashidi cited the film among others on the website 3ain, remarking that:

Egyptian cinema has presented women and dealt with their problems throughout its history, even addressing them by name, sometimes as “mara” [woman] and sometimes as “sitt” [lady]…Here we monitor ten films using the word “sitt” from the earliest days of the silver screen to today.
