= Al-La'ib Ma'a Al-Kibar =

1991 film by Sherif Arafa

Playing with the Big Boys
- Theatrical release poster
- اللعب مع الكبار
- Directed by: Sherif Arafa
- Written by: Wahid Hamed
- Produced by: Aflam Wahid Hamed
- Starring: Adel Emam; Hussein Fahmy; Mahmoud el-Gendy; Mustafa Metwalli; Aida Riad
- Cinematography: Mohsen Nasr
- Edited by: Adel Mounir
- Music by: Moudy Imam
- Distributed by: Etihad El-Fannanin for Cinema and Video
- Release date: 22 June 1991 (Egypt)
- Running time: 100 minutes
- Country: Egypt
- Languages: Arabic, Egyptian Arabic

Playing with the Big Boys (Arabic: اللعب مع الكبار, romanized: Al-La‘ib Ma‘a Al-Kibār) is a 1991 Egyptian comedy-drama directed by Sherif Arafa and written by Wahid Hamed, starring Adel Emam, Hussein Fahmy, Mahmoud el-Gendy, Mustafa Metwalli, and Aida Riad. Released during Eid al-Adha on 10 Dhul-Hijjah 1411 AH (22 June 1991), the film combines crime and social drama and reflects debates current in Egypt at the time.

The film follows Hassan (Adel Emam), an ordinary Cairo resident who becomes involved in reporting corruption cases to the authorities. As the plot progresses, he tries to balance his daily life with the pressure and danger that follow his complaints. His involvement brings him into contact with security services and officials, and the story presents the practical limits he faces when he attempts to challenge those in power.

== Synopsis ==
The film centers on Hassan Behnasi Behloul (Adel Emam), an unemployed man who spends much of his time at Fatouh Café on the corner of Barghout Alley. He faces difficult economic conditions that prevent him from finding stable work and delay his marriage to his fiancée, Hana (Aida Riyad). Hassan lives with his father, a barber, but refuses to take up the profession, which leaves him stuck between limited options and unfulfilled plans for his future.

One night, Hassan wakes up and walks to the café's telephone to call the State Security Agency. He speaks with Officer Mo'tasem al-Alfi (Hussein Fahmy) and reports that a factory will catch fire the next day. When the fire occurs as he described, the officer begins to take him seriously, though he doubts any supernatural explanation. Hassan says he saw the incident in a dream. From that point on, Mo'tasem keeps in contact with him, treating him as a potential source of information while trying to understand how he learns about these events.

Hassan is detained by Officer Mo'tasem al-Alfi, who tries to extract an explanation for how he knew about the fire, but Hassan gives no answer beyond what he has already said. Mo'tasem even brings Hana to his office and records their conversation with a hidden camera, yet nothing incriminating or related to the incident is mentioned. Later, two suspects confess to starting the factory fire, but when Hassan sees them he asks about two other men, Fathi and Rashwan, and states that the confessed arsonists are not the real perpetrators.

Back in his neighborhood, Hassan meets his friend Ali al-Zahhar (Mahmoud El-Gendy). They talk one night on the edge of the desert, where Ali mentions details that later match the incidents Hassan reports. The two are seen together again during a football match between Al Ahly SC and Zamalek SC, while a police informant follows them in the crowd. Even with this surveillance, Officer Mo'tasem is unable to identify how Hassan is getting his information.

Hassan has another dream about an incident and reports that something serious will happen at 19 Marjane Street between 3:00 and 3:30 p.m., without knowing any further details. He goes there with Officer Mo'tasem, and they find a private security guard protecting a political refugee who lives in apartment 12 on the fourth floor. They assume the danger concerns this resident. Around the stated time, the refugee comes out with his dog while schoolchildren are entering the building, and a car carrying four armed men with rifles approaches along the street.

Hassan runs to protect the children, while Officer Mo'tasem moves to shield the refugee. A shootout follows, during which two of the attackers are killed, one is injured, and the fourth surrenders. The refugee and the children escape unharmed. Despite repeated questioning, Officer Mo'tasem cannot determine how Hassan learns about these incidents. Hassan later wakes to find that his case has been reassigned to a new officer, El-Sayouti (Mustafa Metwalli), who subjects him to torture in an attempt to force a confession, but Hassan continues to refuse to reveal any source.

Later, Hassan meets Ali al-Zahhar near the pyramids at night, where Ali calls himself "the Pharaoh of this era" and speaks with pride about trying to protect the country despite his poverty. Around the same time, a wealthy man proposes to Hassan's fiancée, provoking Hassan to assault him in front of the neighborhood. Hassan then goes to the cinema to meet Ali, who gives him information about an upcoming incident. The following day, Hassan informs Officer Mo'tasem that heroin is being smuggled in the suitcase of a politically protected figure whose immunity prevents his luggage from being searched.

On multiple occasions, Hassan predicts crimes before they occur, and each time his information proves accurate. It is later revealed that the incidents he reports are linked to a criminal syndicate with strong connections in the country. The group eventually discovers that the details reaching the security services through Hassan actually come from his friend Ali al-Zahhar, who works at a telephone communication center and overhears confidential calls about planned operations.

Hassan refuses to reveal Ali's identity, even under interrogation and torture, and insists that his information comes from dreams. He keeps to this story to protect Ali from both the syndicate and the authorities, while still allowing details about planned crimes to reach the security services.

Hassan and Ali agree on a plan to expose corruption and criminal activity involving senior figures, including a drug trafficker linked to the heroin trade. As they continue to pass information to the authorities, those involved in the crimes move to silence them, and Ali is killed at his workplace. Hassan, distressed by his friend's death, confronts Officer Mo'tasem and informs him of what happened. In the final scene, Hassan declares that he will keep dreaming, and Mo'tasem participates in a security operation in which the armed attackers are shot.

== Cast ==
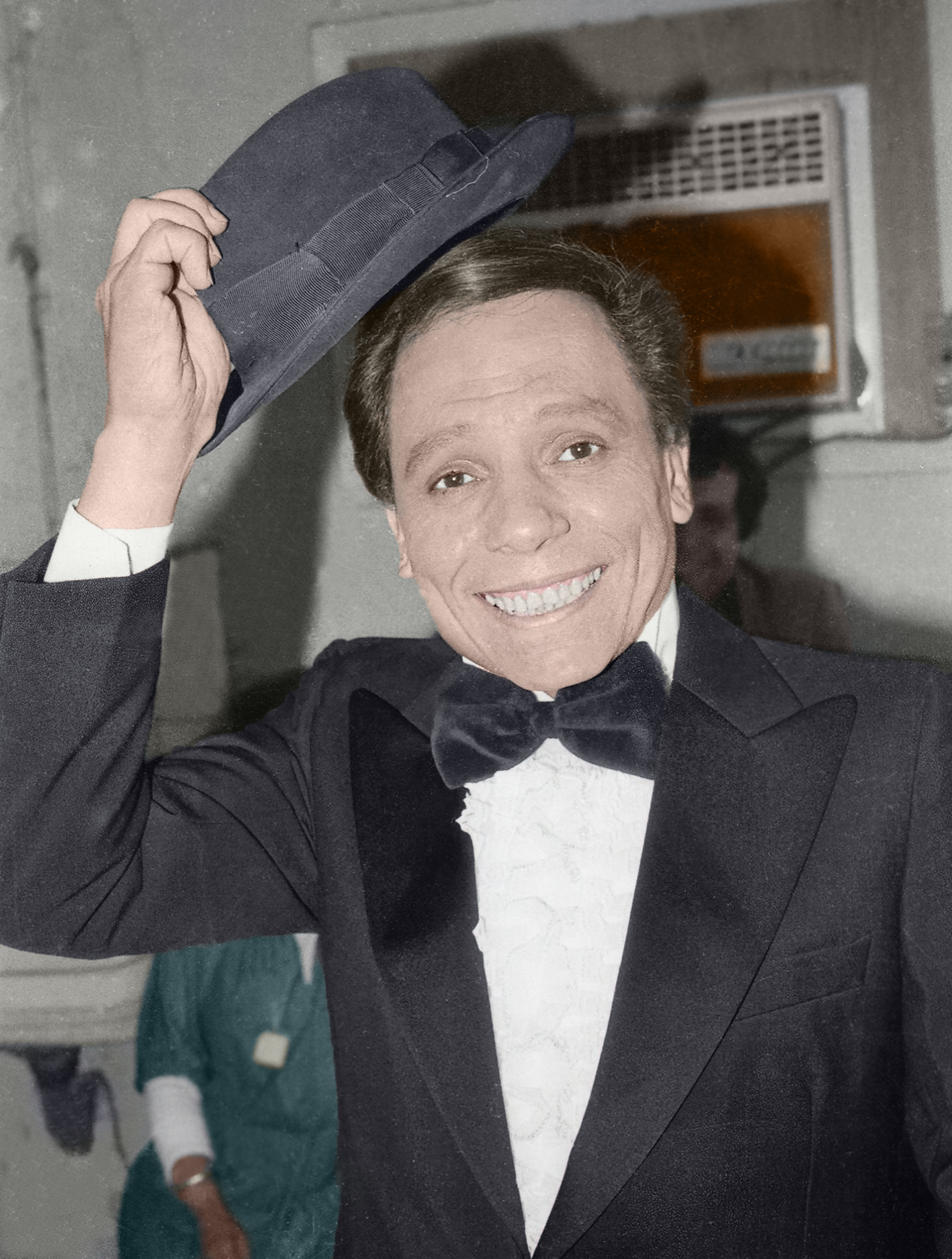
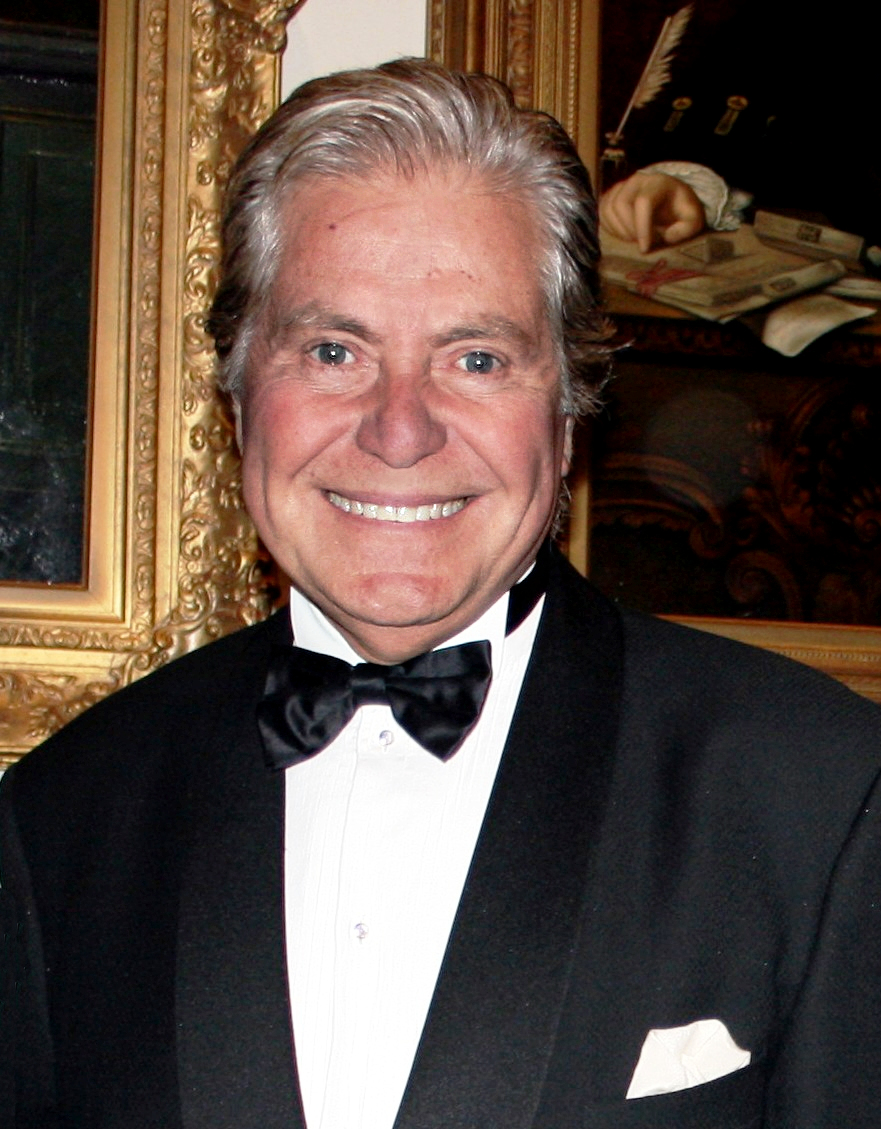
The main actors in the film: Adel Imam and Hussein Fahmy
- Adel Emam: (Hassan Behnasi Behloul)
- Hussein Fahmy: (Officer Mo'tasem Al-Alfi)
- Mahmoud el-Gendy: (Ali Al-Zuhar)
- Aida Riyad: (Hanaa)
- Gamal Ismail: (The Coffee Shop Owner)
- Mustafa Metwalli: (Al-Asyouti)
- Abdel Hafiz El-Tatawy: (Behnasi Behloul the Barber - Hassan's Father)
- Ahmed Louxor: (Behnasi's Friend)
- Hanem Mohamed: (Hanaa's Mother)
- Karim El-Husseini: (The Minister's Son)
- Mohamed Al-Sawy: (State Security Detective)
- Hisham Abdallah: (Investigative Officer)
- Abu El-Fotouh Amara: (The Informant)
- Sayed Hatem: (Farag Abu Zaid)
- Hisham Osman
- Abdel Hadi Anwar
- Adel Khalaf

=== Guest appearances ===
- Ahmed Rateb: (The Arab Diplomat)
- Ahmed Aql: (Member of Parliament)
- Said El-Saleh: (Sergeant Madbouli Abdel Aal)
- Bassam Ragab: (Hanaa's New Fiancé)

=== With participation from ===
- Hamdy Youssef: (The Mysterious Man)
- Zayed Fouad
- Hamdy Salem
- Fouad Farghaly
- Ezzat El-Mashad: (Media Spokesperson)
- Tawfiq El-Kurdi: (General Omar El-Sayyad)
- Hassan El-Deeb
- Ahmed Kamaly
- Abdel Wahab El-Hadidi: (Media Supervisor)
- Ahmed El-Barai: (Coffee Shop Patron)
- Mahmoud Abu Zeid
- Wahid Hamed: (Man at the Coffee Table)
- Adel Helal
- Leila Abdel Hakim: (Aalia - Fouad Farghaly's Wife)
- Hindeya: (Wedding Dancer)
- Hussein Arar: (Soft Drink Vendor)
- Abdel Jawad Metwally: (Airport Officer)
- Yehia Suleiman
- Nihad Ramez

== Reception ==
Playing with the Big Boys was well received by critics, who highlighted Adel Emam's performance as Hassan and described it as one of his more nuanced popular roles. Reviewers also noted the screenplay's focus on corruption and state security as characteristic of Wahid Hamed's style. The film marked his sixth collaboration with Emam, following works such as Elect Dr. Suleiman (1981), Al-Insan Ya‘ish Marra Wahida (1981), Al-Ghoul (1983), Al Halfout (1984), and the television series Dreams of the Flying Boy (1978). It has been included in several surveys of notable Egyptian films and was ranked 90th in a list of the 100 greatest Egyptian films announced during the 20th Cairo International Film Festival in 1996.

Critic Fathi Farag wrote that Wahid Hamed showed skill in writing a script that joins seriousness with awareness of real social issues while still appealing to a wide audience. He viewed the film as a clear example of this method, using an original device that mixes dream scenes with reality under the direction of Sherif Arafa. The main character, Hassan Bahloul, played by Adel Emam, moves between these two worlds: he is a young, unemployed university graduate, aimless, sarcastic, poor, and in love. Farag noted that Emam often appears to stroll through the corridors of the Interior Ministry as casually as if he were walking in Zamalek's fish garden, joking with informants, even as the soundtrack carries the noise of torture. He also pointed out how the film mocks informants and guards, who seem almost ridiculous, and adopts a satirical tone toward the large and tangled bureaucracy that produces no real results. In Farag's view, "Playing with the Big Boys" is both a popular, commercially successful film and a serious work that is well made in its script, direction, acting, and music.
