= The Lady of the Black Moons =

- Poster
- Directed by: Samir A. Khouri
- Written by: Samir A. Khouri
- Produced by: Sharikat al-Aruz al-ʻĀlamīyah
- Starring: Nahed Yousri
- Music by: Patrick Samson; Soso Khoury
- Release date: 1971
- Running time: 106 minutes
- Country: Lebanon
- Languages: Egyptian Arabic; French

The Lady of the Black Moons (Arabic: سيدة الأقمار السوداء, Sayyidat al-aqmār al-sawdāʼ, French: La dame aux lunes noires) is a 1971 Lebanese fantastique-sexploitation film directed by Lebanese director Samir A. Khouri and featuring a neh predominantly Egyptian main cast. The film had particular success in Tunisia as well as Lebanon. The Lady of the Black Moons was released on DVD by Sabbah Media Corporation in 2002.

== Plot ==
Aida (Nahed Yousri) is married to rich and older Sami (Adel Adham) but she still suffers because of her love to Omar (Hussein Fahmy). While Sami's sister Gigi (Shahinaz) grows an affection for Omar, Aida tries to find satisfaction with male prostitutes at the house of Victoria (Theodora Rasi) but she has violent dreams during full moon, reflecting her traumatic past.

== Cast ==
- Nahed Yousri: Aida
- Adel Adham: Sami
- Hussein Fahmy: Omar
- Shahinaz: Gigi / Juliette
- Theodora Rasi: Victoria
- Philippe Akiki: Sami's father
