= Gamil Atia Ibrahim =

Egyptian novelist and writer (1937–2020)

- Born: 1937; Giza Governorate
- Died: 2020 (aged 82–83); Basel City
- Notable work: 1952 Novel

Gamil Atia Ibrahim جميل عطية إبراهيم (1937 in Giza Governorate – April 10, 2020, in Basel) was an Egyptian novelist and writer. In addition, he was one of the founders of the literary magazine Gallery 68. He was he was one of the pioneers of the sixth literary movement. His most prominent works are Joining the Sea and his trilogy (1952), which was ranked by the Arab Writers Union among the top hundred Arab novels.

== Early life ==
Gamil was born in Giza Governorate in 1937. He earned various academic certificates that led him to several jobs. Before graduating from university, he worked as an account clerk in textile factory Shubra Al Khaymah. He then worked as a music teacher as well as a teacher of arithmetic, algebra and engineering. Later, he joined Al Imam Al Asili School in Morocco. This experience led to his novel Asilah. After graduating from university, he published stories and worked as both a financial and administrative inspector in Ministry of Youth in the 1960s.

== Career ==
He targeted mass audiences because of his professors Naguib Maffouz, Saad Eddin, Wahba and Yaqoub Al Shaouni. He worked as a reporter for Arab newspapers. He continued to write for mass audiences until he traveled to Switzerland in 1979, where he worked and translated for the United Nations.

== Works ==
- Joining the Sea
- The Sea is not Full
- Asilah
- Scheherazade on Geneva Lake
- The Treasure of Talking
- 1952
- 1954 Papers
- 1981
- A Palm on Edge
- Alexandria Papers
- A Matter of Barbarianism

== Other works ==
- Side Talks (Short story collection)
- Salah Issa participated in a book (The Conspiracy, Balfour Promise) 2 November 1917

== Death ==
Gamil died on April 10, 2020, at age 83, in a Basel nursing home. He spent the last two years at home, suffering from Alzheimer's disease.
