= Adel Adham =

Egyptian film actor (1928–1996)

- عادل أدهم
- Born: March 8, 1928; Alexandria, Egypt
- Died: February 1, 1996 (aged 67); Cairo, Egypt
- Occupation: Actor
- Years active: 1928–1996

Adel Adham (Arabic: عادل أدهم; March 8, 1928 – February 1, 1996) was an Egyptian actor. He was known for his portrayal of evil and ambiguous characters. He was awarded the title of Prince of Cinema.

== Career ==
Adel Adham was born on March 8, 1928, in Alexandria, Egypt, to an Egyptian father and Egyptian-Turkish mother.

His debut in cinema was the year 1945 in the film Laila, Daughter of the Poor (1945).

== Filmography ==
- Makansh alal bal (1950)
- The Technical Director (1965)
- Fares Bani Hemdan (1966)
- El mughammerun el talata (1966)
- El khaena (1966)
- Come rubammo la bomba atomica (1967) - James Bomb
- Nora (1967) - Fares
- Akhtar Ragol fil Alam (1967) - Jean
- Ayyam el-hob (1968) - Galal
- Altin avcilari (1968)
- Afrah (1968) - The Thief
- Hiya wa l chayatin (1969)
- El Achrar (1970)
- The Lady of the Black Moons (1970) - Sami
- Adrift on the Nile (1971) - Ali
- The Killers (1971) – Aziz
- Imtithal (1971)
- The Visitor (1972)
- Si può fare molto con sette donne (1972)
- The Guilty (1975)
- Leqa ma al-madi (1975)
- Hekmatak ya rab (1976) - Zaki Qodra
- Ah ya liel ya zaman (1977) - Elias
- Khateeat Malak (1979)
- Flatfoot in Egypt (1980) - Elver Zakar
- Al shaytan yaez (1981)
- Al-nasabin (1984)
- El-forn (1984)
- Safqa maa Emraa (1985) - Essam
- El Sayed Eshta (1985) - Sayed Eshta
- Ragol lehaza alzaman (1986)
- Ragol lehaza alzaman (1986)
- Enteqam, -al (1986)
- Supermarket (1990) - Dr. Azmy
- Sawwaq el hanem (1993) - Pasha
