= The Killers (1971 film) =

1971 Egyptian crime thriller film

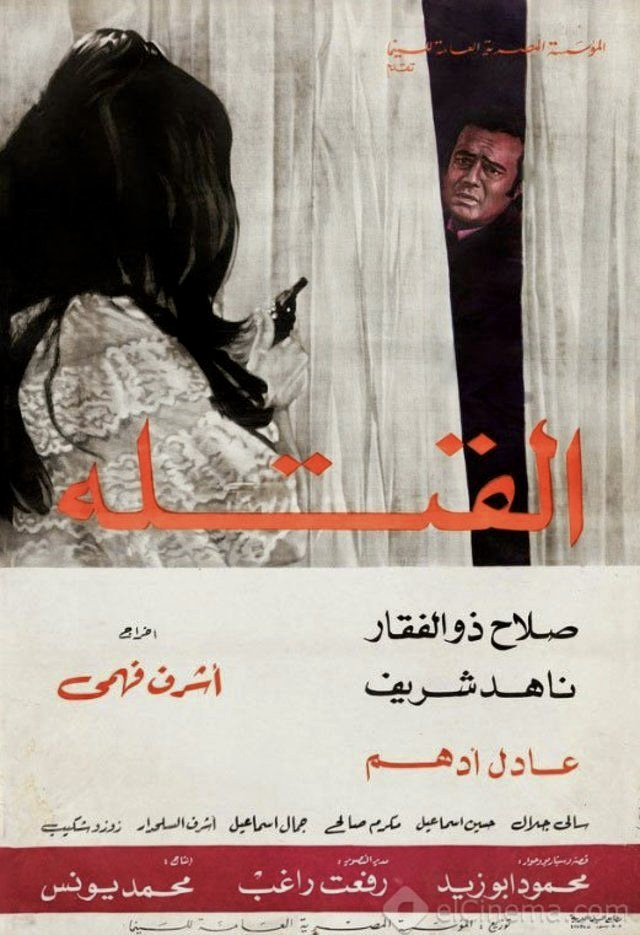
- Film poster
- Egyptian Arabic: القتلة
- Directed by: Ashraf Fahmy
- Written by: Mahmoud Abu Zeid
- Produced by: Mohammed Younes
- Starring: Salah Zulfikar; Nahed Sherif
- Cinematography: Refaat Ragheb
- Edited by: Gamil Abdel Aziz
- Production company: General Egyptian Corporation for Cinema Production
- Distributed by: General Egyptian Corporation for Cinema Production
- Release date: 25 March 1971
- Country: Egypt
- Language: Egyptian Arabic

The Killers (Arabic: القتلة, translit: El-Qatala or Al-Qatala) is a 1971 Egyptian crime thriller starring Salah Zulfikar and Nahed Sherif. The film is written by Mahmoud Abu Zeid and directed by Ashraf Fahmy.

== Synopsis ==
Adel Shawkat has a firm belief that his stepfather killed his father to marry his mother. He makes a strange deal with the unemployed Aziz Abu El Ezz, who wants to get rid of his wife Sawsan, to cash her life insurance policy. Adel pledges to kill Aziz's wife in return for Aziz killing his stepfather.

== Main cast ==
- Salah Zulfikar: Adel Shawkat
- Nahed Sherif: Sawsan Fahmy
- Adel Adham: Aziz Abu El Ezz
- Zozo Chakib: Adel's mother
- Gamal Ismail: Public prosecutor
- Emad Muharram: Emad Rashad
- Ashraf El-Selehdar: Hussein
- Hussein Ismail: Shawish

== Production ==
The film was produced and distributed by the state owned, General Egyptian Corporation for Cinema Production.

== See also ==
- Crime thrillers
- Egyptian cinema
- Salah Zulfikar filmography
- List of Egyptian films of the 1970s
