= Ashraf Fahmy =

Egyptian film director (1936–2001)

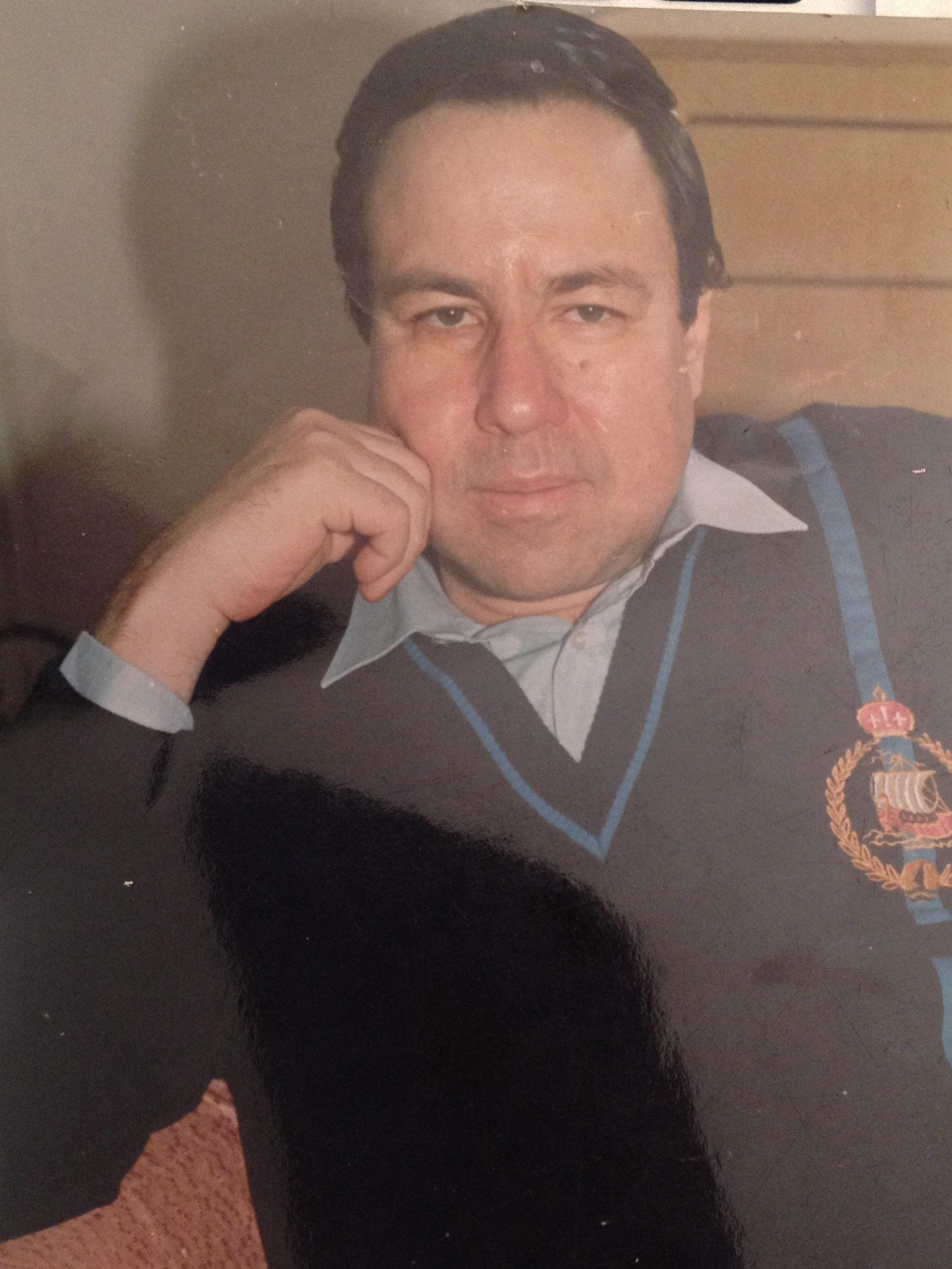
- Fahmy in Cairo 90's
- Born: 25 August 1936; Cairo, Egypt
- Died: 25 January 2001 (aged 64); Cairo, Egypt
- Occupation: Egyptian Film Director.

Ashraf Fahmy (Arabic: أشرف فهمي; 25 August 1936 – 25 January 2001) was an Egyptian film director, active in the Egyptian film industry since the late 1960s. He was credited with launching his career and directing his first feature film (The Killers – Arabic: القتلة) with the lead role played by leading film star Salah Zulfikar, making a huge commercial success. Fahmy is a daring director frequently seen in film festivals worldwide, in addition he wrote the script of three films including (Until The End of Lifetime – Arabic: حتى آخر العمر ), considered one of his notable films.

== Early academic life ==
Ashraf Fahmy earned a bachelor's degree of arts (History major) from the Cairo University in 1961, then he graduated from the Egyptian High Cinema Institute in Giza (first class) in 1963 to start his career in the Egyptian cinema, after that he studied Directing at the University of California from 1964 until 1967.

== Starting as a director ==
Fahmy worked as a director at the "National Center for Documentary Seetma", he directed his first short film; A New Life and was awarded for this film at "Dok Leipzigfilm festival", then worked as an assistant to Fatin Abdel Wahab, Abduel Rahman Khamisi and Youssef Chahine, then he directed his first Feature Film The Killers (1971).

== Personal life ==
Ashraf Fahmy was born and raised in Cairo, he was a son of an Egyptian father of a high-class family of Cairo and a Turkish mother, got married twice and has one son Mostafa Ashraf Fahmy and two daughters Jala Fahmy from a different mother and Ingy, He died in the early 2001's during an open heart surgery leaving a legacy in Egyptian cinema.

== Cinema ==
Since his first feature film (The Killers – Egyptian Arabic: القتلة) which was starred by Egypt's influential movie star Salah Zulfikar earning him huge box office success in Fahmy's debut. His films of the 70's, 80's & 90's gave him a reputation as a director of thrillers. He was involved in the Cinema Council Adarhmassh in 1969 and then nominated as chairman of the board of directors of Studios, Production and High investment in 1977. throughout his career, he directed, wrote and produced over 50 feature films.

== Awards ==
Fahmy was honored by Egyptian, Middle eastern & International Film Festivals. His most notable award was for A New life at the Dok Leipzig film festival of Leipzig, East Germany.

== Filmography ==
- Writer:
  1. Execution of a Judge (1990)
  2. School Teacher Assassination (1988)
  3. Until The End of Lifetime (1975)
- Producer:
  1. The Unknown (1984)
  2. The Housemaid (1984)
  3. The Investigation is still ongoing (1979)
- Director: 50 Films

=== Films ===
| # | Year | Arabic Title | Translation | Transliteration | Notes |
|---|---|---|---|---|---|
| 1 | 2002 | العشق والدم | Love and Blood | al Eshq w al dam | Actress Sherihan |
| 2 | 2000 | إمرأة تحت المراقبة | Woman under surveillance | emraa that el morakabah | |
| 3 | 1998 | القتل اللذيذ | The Tasty Murder | El-katl El-laziz | |
| 4 | 1997 | امرأة فوق القمة | Woman on the top | emraa foka al kemma | |
| 5 | 1997 | سنوات الشقاء والحب مسلسل | Years of misery and love the series | sanawat el shakaa w alhob | |
| 6 | 1995 | ضربة جزاء | Penalty | darbet gazaa | |
| 7 | 1994 | الرايا حمرا | The red banner | el raya el hamraa | |
| 8 | 1994 | ليلة القتل | The night of the murder | Laylat El Katl | |
| 9 | 1993 | الحب بين قوسين | Love Brackets | el hob bain kawseen | |
| 10 | 1993 | لصوص خمس نجوم | Five-Star Thieves | lesos khamas negoom | Actor Salah Zulfikar |
| 11 | 1992 | فخ الجواسيس | Spies Trap | Fakh al jawasees | |
| 12 | 1991 | قانون إيكا | The Law of Ica | kanoon Ica | |
| 13 | 1990 | ليل و خونة | Night and Traitors | layl w khawanah | |
| 14 | 1990 | اعدام قاضى | Judge Execution | eadam kady | |
| 15 | 1989 | عنبر الموت | Death Row | anbar al mawt | |
| 16 | 1988 | بستان الدم | Blood Orchard | Bostan el dam | |
| 17 | 1988 | اغتيال مدرسة | Assassination of a Teacher | Eghteyal modaresa | |
| 18 | 1987 | امراة مطلقة | The Divorced woman | Imraa Motalaka | |
| 19 | 1987 | لعدم كفاية الادلة | For lack of Evidence | li adam kefayet al adella | |
| 20 | 1986 | وصمة عار | Stain | Wasmat Aar | |
| 21 | 1985 | سعد اليتيم | Saad the Orphan | Saad el yateem | |
| 22 | 1984 | الراقصة والطبال | The Dancer and The Drummer | Al-raqissa wa al-tabal | |
| 23 | 1984 | لا تسألنى من أنا | Do not ask me who I am | La tasalni man ana | |
| 24 | 1984 | المجهول | The Unknown | el maghool | |
| 25 | 1984 | الخادمة | The Maid | el khadima | |
| 26 | 1984 | كلام | Words | kalam | |
| 27 | 1983 | حادث النصف متر | The half meters accident | hadithet el nsf mtr | |
| 28 | 1982 | الخبز المر | The Bitter Bread | el khobz el mor | Actress Sherihan |
| 29 | 1981 | الشيطان يعظ | The Devil Preaches | Al shaytan yaez | |
| 30 | 1980 | الشريدة | The Houseless | Al sharida | |
| 31 | 1980 | الوحش داخل الإنسان | The beast inside a man | al wahsh dakhel ensan | |
| 32 | 1980 | الأقوياء | The Toughs | al akweyia | |
| 33 | 1979 | كرامتى | My dignity | karamati | |
| 34 | 1979 | ولا يزال التحقيق مستمرا | The investigation is still on | Wa la yazal al tahqiq mostameran | |
| 35 | 1979 | مع سبق الإصرار | premeditated | maa sabk el esrar | |
| 36 | 1978 | رحلة داخل امراة | A Trip inside a woman | Rehla dakhel emraa | |
| 37 | 1978 | المرأة الأخرى | The Other Woman | Al maraa al okhra | |
| 38 | 1978 | امراة قتلها الحب | Woman killed her love | emraa katalha al hob | |
| 39 | 1977 | بص شوف سكر بتعمل ايه | Look what Sugar does | bos shof sokkar btaamel eh | |
| 40 | 1977 | ميعاد مع سوسو | A Date with Soso | meaad maa Soso | |
| 41 | 1976 | شوق | Longing | shawk | |
| 42 | 1976 | امواج بلا شاطئ | Beach Without Waves | amwaj bela shatea | |
| 43 | 1975 | حتى آخر العمر | Until The End of Lifetime | hatta akher el omr | |
| 44 | 1974 | امرأة عاشقه | Woman in-love | emraa ashiqa | |
| 45 | 1973 | ليل وقضبان | Night and Bars | lail w kodban | |
| 46 | 1972 | رغبات ممنوعة | Forbidden Needs | Raghabat Mamnouaa | |
| 47 | 1972 | صور ممنوعة القصة الأولى (ممنوع) | Forbidden Pictures | Sowar Mamnouaa | |
| 48 | 1971 | القتلة | The Killers | al katalah | Film debut, Actor Salah Zulfikar |
| 49 | 1970 | واحد فى المليون | One in a million | Wahed fel million | Ass. Director |
| 50 | 1970 | الأرض | The Land | al ard | Ass. Director |

== Sources ==
- https://web.archive.org/web/20150713163252/http://www.africapedia.com/TOP-AFRICAN-FILM-DIRECTORS-IN-ALPHABETICAL-ORDER
- http://www.elcinema.com/person/pr1096229/
