= Laila Elwi =

Egyptian actress

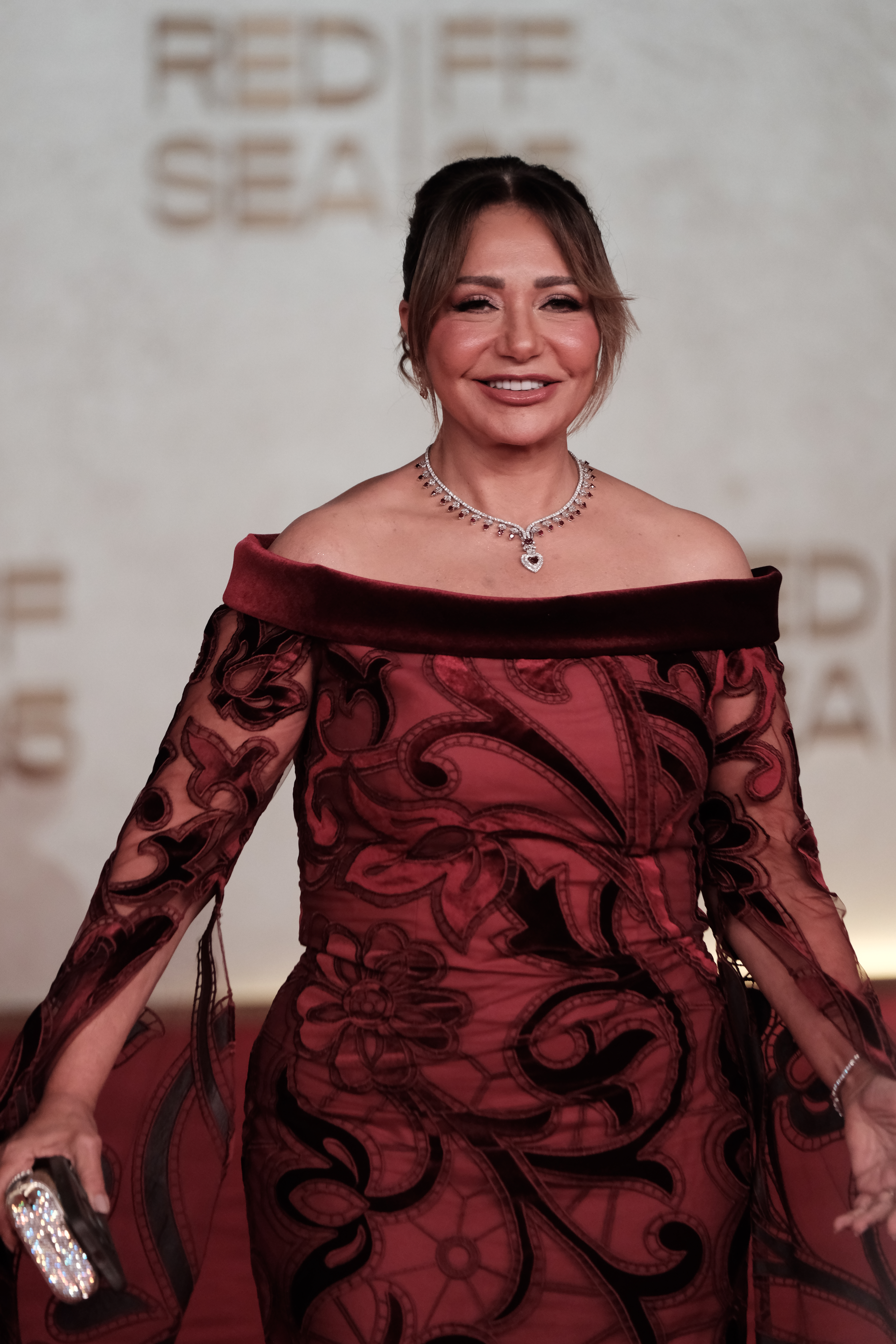
- Elwi in 2025
- Born: Laila Ahmed Elwi; January 4, 1962 (age 64); Cairo, Egypt
- Citizenship: Egyptian-Greek
- Occupation: Actress
- Years active: 1977–present
- Spouses: Mansour al-Gammal (m. 2007; div. 2015)
- Children: Khaled Elwi

Laila Ahmed Elwi (born January 4, 1962, in Cairo), sometimes credited as Laila Eloui, Laila Olwy, Laila Eloui, and Laila Elwy (Arabic: ليلى علوي), is an Egyptian actress. She has starred in more than 70 movies and has been honored at Egyptian and international festivals with awards for most of her roles.

She has also been the head – or member – of several jury committees for local and international festivals. Recently, she has received an award for her lifetime achievements along with Egyptian actress Safia El Emari, South Korean actress Yoon Jeong-hee, American actor Richard Gere, and French actress Juliette Binoche during the opening of the 34th Cairo International Film Festival.

== Biography ==
Layla Elwy is an actress born in January 4, 1962. Her father Ahmad Eloui is an Egyptian, while her mother Stella is Greek from Icaria. Eloui's maternal grandmother was of Italian descent, she came to Egypt to work at the Marriott Mena House Hotel.

Laila Elwi began her career at a young age, appearing on radio with Abla Fadeela and on children’s television programs such as *Mama Samiha*. She later attended French schools and graduated from the Faculty of Commerce in 1991. As a child, she appeared in several films before her talent was recognized by actor Nour El-Sherif, who noticed her during a stage performance.

Elwy made her television debut as a mature actress in the series *Dimoo’ Fawq al-Haqiqa* (*Tears Over the Truth*). She went on to appear in numerous stage and television productions, including *Al-Brenseesa* (*The Princess*), *Gamilla wa Wahshayn* (*Two Beasts and a Beauty*), *8 Sittat* (*8 Women*), *Al-‘Aaila* (*The Family*), *Al-Tawaam* (*The Twins*), and *Alf Leyla wa Leyla* (*One Thousand and One Nights*).

Throughout her career, Elwy received numerous film awards and worked as a producer on *Ya Mihalabiya Ya*. She was also honored at several festivals, including the 2002 Love Festival. Regarded as one of the most accomplished actresses of her generation, she delivered particularly memorable performances in *Al-Muzniboon* (*The Guilty*) and *Kharag wa Lam Ya’od* (*He Left but Did Not Return*).

Her selected awards includes, best actress award in radio and television awards in Egypt in 2005, best actress for her role as a Christian wife in the film Bahib El Cima (I Love the Cinema) at the Eleventh National Film Festival in Egypt. Laila played the role of the wife of a cruel man who abuses her constantly. She also won best actress award for her role in Alhagama and best second role in The kidnapped from The Cinema Catholic Center, best actress for her role in drama film (1992) The Revolving stone, best actress award for her role in the films Al Hijama” and Al Makhtoufa, best actress for her part in drama television series, Napoleon Wal Mahrousa. In 2010, Laila Elwi was granted A lifetime achievement award during the opening of the 34th Cairo international film Festival.

== Films ==
- Min Agl Al-Haya (1977).
- Kharag wa Lam Ya'oud (1985).
- Ayam Al-Tahadi (1985).
- Gababerat Al-Mena (1985).
- Hekaya fi Kelmeteen (1985).
- Al-Nesaa (1985).
- Zawg Taht Eltalab (1985).
- Wa Tadhak Al-Akdar (1985).
- E’daa’m Mayet (1985).
- Al-Harafesh (1986).
- Al-Onsa (1986).
- Ah ya Balad (1986).
- Taht Al-Tahdeed (1986).
- Azraa wa Thalath Regal (1986).
- Asr Al-Ze'ab (1986).
- Kelmeta.
- Ya Azizi Kolona Losous.
- Samaa Hoss.
- Ya Mehalabeya Ya.
- Al-Hagama.
- Ay Ay.
- Enzar Belta'a.
- Kalil Men Al Hob Katheer Men Al Onf.
- Al Ragol Al Talet.
- Esharet Morour.
- Tofah.
- Ya Donya Ya Gharami.
- Edhak Al Soura Tetla Helwa.
- Al-Massir (1997).
- Hala'a Housh (1997).
- Our Blessed Aunt (1998)
- Hob Al-Banat (2003).
- Baheb Al-Cima halif bro as Laila Eloui (2005).
- Alwan elsama elsabaah (2008).
- Laylat Al Baby Doll (2008).
- Hakayat Bin Ash-ha (2009).
- El Basabees We El 3osyan describing the story of a girl who became psychotic after her brother took her toka
- Brooks, Meadows and Lovely Faces (2016)
- 200 Pounds (2021)

== Television ==
- "Lahazat Harega" "Critical moments" (2007)
- Shams (2014)
- Napoleon Wal Mahrousa (2012)
- Wa Kan Wahman (TV short) 1984
