= Adrift on the Nile =

1966 book by Naguib Mahfouz

- Cover of the first US edition
- Author: Naguib Mahfouz
- Original title: ثرثرة فوق النيل
- Translator: Frances Liardet (Doubleday, 1993 ed.)
- Genre: Fiction, Literature, Egyptian Literature, Arabic Literature
- Publisher: Dar Shorouq, Egypt
- Publication date: 1966
- Media type: Print (paperback)
- Pages: 201 pp

Adrift on the Nile (Thartharah fawqa al-Nīl, Arabic: ثرثرة فوق النيل) is a 1966 book by Egyptian author and Nobel Laureate Naguib Mahfouz. The novel was later made into a 1971 film, Chitchat on the Nile. It was translated from Arabic into English in 1993 by Frances Liardet and published by Doubleday.

The book follows Anis Zani who smokes kief every night with a group of friends on a houseboat on the Nile. Anis works as a civil servant but soon finds his life encumbered by his drug use. The book explores nihilism and spiritual emptiness.

== Plot summary ==
The book starts out with Anis Zani, the protagonist, being disciplined by his boss for submitting a blank report. It's revealed that Anis wrote the report under the influence of drugs, which prevented him from realizing his pen was out of ink. Anis and a group of fellow addicts get together every night to smoke keif on a houseboat on the Nile. Samara, a young journalist, visits the group in order to report on them. The tranquility of the group collapses as they begin to argue about topics like love, morality and purpose. The downfall of the group is accelerated when, one night as they are taking a midnight excursion by car, they hit a person and flee the scene.

== Awards ==
- The Nobel Prize in Literature 1988
