= Madiha Kamel =

Egyptian actress (1948–1997)

- مديحة كامل
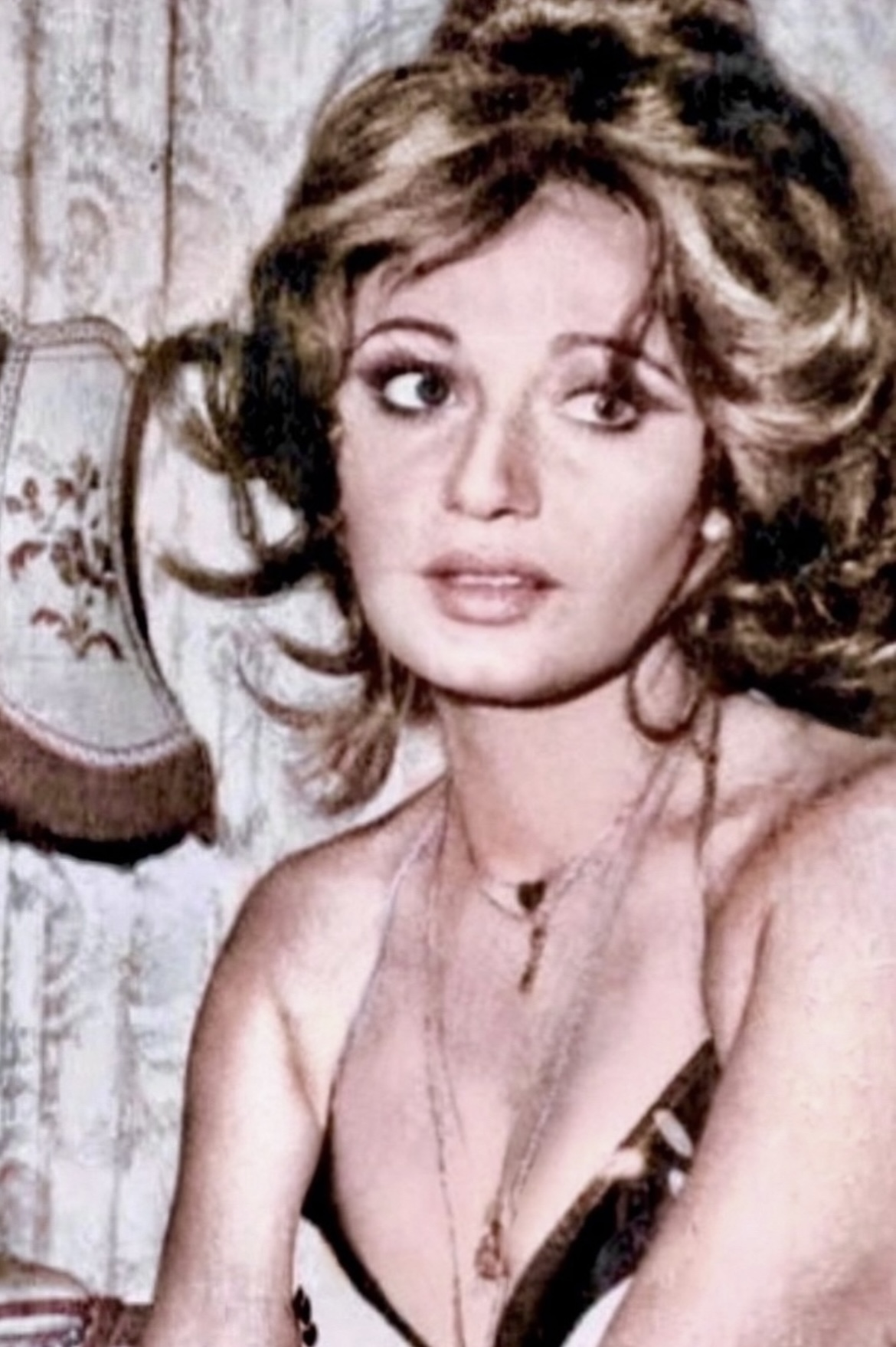
- Kamel in the 1970s
- Born: Madiha Kamel; 3 August 1948; Alexandria, Kingdom of Egypt
- Died: 13 January 1997 (aged 48); Cairo, Egypt
- Occupation: Actress

Madiha Kamel (Arabic: مديحة كامل; 3 August 1948 – 13 January 1997) was an Egyptian actress.

== Early life ==
Madiha Kamel was born in Alexandria. In 1963, as a teenager, her family moved to Cairo. Accompanied by her mother, she presented herself to a modeling contest. She was selected and did some fashion shows for fashion designers.

== Career ==
She was noticed by a director, Ahmed Diaa Eddine, who encouraged her to become an actress. She accepted one of his proposals for a role and played in Fatat shaza (Abnormal Girl), released in 1964; she did theatre and radio sketches while finishing her studies at Ain Shams University.

She played other secondary roles with other directors, and with multiple leading actors, such as her role in a film released in 1974, Fi Saif Lazem Nihib (In Summer We Must Love), with Salah Zulfikar. She got her first leading role much later, in a film released in 1978, El-Soud ela al-hawia (Climbing to the Bottom), by Kamal al-Sheikh, with Mahmoud Yassin as the other lead actor. In this film, she plays the role of an Egyptian spy who betrays her country. In television, she shared the lead with Salah Zulfikar in Intiqam Imra'a (A Woman's Revenge), aired on Egyptian and Arab television for the first time in 1983.

In 1993, in the middle of shooting the film Bawwâbat Iblîs (The Gates of Satan), she was diagnosed with breast cancer. Without participating in the shooting of the last sequences of the film, she goes abroad to be operated. Treated but not completely cured, she gave up her career. She decided to put on the hijab and to make the hajj (pilgrimage to Mecca). In 1996, she was hospitalized again for months. She died at home at the beginning of 1997.

== Selected filmography ==
=== Film ===
- 1964 – Fatat shaza (An Abnormal Girl)
- 1966 – 30 Yom Fel Segn (30 days in prison)
- 1970 – Dalâl al-massriyyah (Dalal, the Egyptian)
- 1973 – Al Sokkareya
- 1974 – Fi Saif Lazem Nihib (In Summer We Must Love)
- 1977 – The Hyena's Sun
- 1978 – El-Soud ela al-hawia (Climbing to the Bottom)
- 1980 – ‘Adkiyaa lakim Aghbiya (Smart but Stupid)
- 1981 – ‘Ouyoun lâ tanâm (Eyes wide awake)
- 1983 – Darb al-hawâ (The alley of love)
- 1984 – Banât Iblîs (Daughters of Satan),
- 1985 – Malaff fî-l-âdâb (Registered with the Morality Police)
- 1986 – Lâ taudam-mirnî ma'ak (Don't Destroy Me with You)
- 1988 – al-Foulous wa-l-wouhouch (Money and Monsters)
- 1989 – al-'Agouz wa-l-baltaguî (The Old Man and the Rogue)
- 1990 – El-Arafeet (The Devils)
- 1990 – Chawader (Shawadir)
- 1990 – Al-Soqout (The Downfall)
- 1993 – Bawabat Iblees (The Gates of Satan)

=== Television ===
- 1983 – Intiqam Imra’a (A Woman's Revenge)

=== Theater ===
- 1969 – Hallo Shalaby (Hello Shalabi)
