= Abdel Moneim Madbouly =

Egyptian actor, comedian and playwright

- عبدالمنعم مدبولي
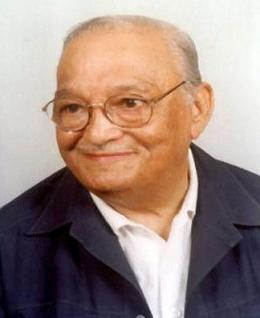
- Abdel Moneim Madbouly in 2006
- Born: December 28, 1921; Cairo, Sultanate of Egypt
- Died: July 9, 2006 (aged 84); Cairo, Egypt
- Occupations: Actor, playwright
- Years active: 1949–2005

Abdel Moneim Madbouly (Arabic: عبد المنعم مدبولي; December 28, 1921 – July 9, 2006) was an Egyptian actor, comedian and playwright.

== Biography ==
Madbouly was born in Cairo and started acting at seven years old following the death of his father, as his family needed the money. Later on, he joined Fatma Rushdi's troupe of actors before joining the theatre of renowned Lebanese actor George Abyad.

Madbouly had an extensive career and is considered one of the greatest in the history of Egyptian and Arabic entertainment industry. He wrote, directed and acted in numerous plays, films and TV roles. His unique comedy style of depicting heartbroken old men was called Madboulism, and is much imitated by other performers from the middle east region. Adel Emam is probably the best known performer to use the Madboulism style.

== Filmography ==
- In Al-Hawa Sawa: 1951
- My Mom and Me: 1957
- Me and My Heart: 1957
- Love Festival: 1958
- Between Heaven and Earth: 1959
- Heignonne: 1960
- Take Me With You: 1965
- Love for All: 1965
- Kill Me Please: 1965
- In Summer We Must Love: 1974

== Death ==
Abdel Moneim Madbouly died in Cairo in 2006 of congestive heart failure.
