= Hussein Kamal =

Egyptian director (1932–2003)

- Born: 17 August 1932; Egypt
- Died: 24 March 2003 (aged 70); Cairo, Egypt
- Occupation: Film director
- Years active: 1947 – 1984

Hussein Kamal (Arabic: حسين كمال; 17 August 1932 – 24 March 2003) was an Egyptian television, film and theatre director. He is considered to be an important director of traditional Egyptian cinema. One of his most famous films is Chitchat on the Nile (1971), a critique of the decadence of Egyptian society during the Nasser era. His 1972 film Empire M was entered into the 8th Moscow International Film Festival in 1973.

== Selected filmography ==
=== Film ===
- The Impossible (1965)
- A Taste of Fear (1969)
- My Father Up on the Tree (1969)
- Chitchat on the Nile (1971)
- Empire M (1972)

=== Television ===
- The Return of the Spirit (1977)
