= Ebn meen fel mogtamaa =

- ابن مين في المجتمع
- Directed by: Hassan al-Imam
- Written by: Mohamed Moustapha Sami
- Produced by: Ibrahim Saleh
- Starring: Mohamed Tharwat; Mona Gabr; Huda Sultan; Salah Mansour; Hadi el-Gayar; Hussein al-Imam; Ibrahim el-Shamy; Nahed Samir; Ragaa Youssef
- Cinematography: Ibrahim Saleh
- Edited by: Fikri Rostom
- Music by: Moody el-Imam; Hussein al-Imam
- Production companies: Dollar Film (Ismail Kurdi and Sons)
- Distributed by: Anwar Sheikh Yassin
- Release date: May 31, 1982
- Running time: 110 minutes
- Country: Egypt
- Language: Arabic

Ebn meen fel mogtamaa (Arabic: ابن مين في المجتمع, lit. "The Son of a Local Man") is an Egyptian drama film released in 1982. It was directed by Hassan al-Imam, is written by Mohamed Moustapha Sami, and stars Mohamed Tharwat, Mona Gabr, and Huda Sultan. The story’s premise starts with Hajji Ibrahim al-Halawani, who marries the maid who bears his child and leaves all his inheritance to that son named Hamada, angering elder sons Khalil and Khamis, who to kill their father, frame the maid, and leave Hamada to the wolves. The film premiered in Egyptian theaters on May 31, 1982.

== Cast ==
- Mohamed Tharwat (Hamada al-Halawani, youngest son of Hajji Ibrahim Al-Halawani and Firdaws)
- Mona Gabr (Souad, daughter of Tafaida al-Halawani)
- Hoda Sultan (Firdaws, Hajji Ibrahim al-Halawani’s servant and wife)
- Salah Mansour (Younes al-Saftawi)
- Hussein al-Imam (Khalil al-Halawani)
- Hadi el-Gayar (Khamis al-Halawani)
- Ibrahim al-Shami (Hajji Ibrahim Al-Halawani)
- Nahed Samir (Tafaida al-Halawani, Hajj’s cousin and Souad’s mother)
- Ragaa Youssef (friend of Firdaws)
- Mahmoud Rashad (orphanage director)
- Haridi Iman (Uncle Haridi)
- Ahlam Helmy
- Madiha Selim
- Mokhtar al-Sayed
- Samia Ahmed
- Abdel Moneim El Nimr
- Hiam Abdel Latif

== Synopsis ==
Hajji Ibrahim Al-Halawani (Ibrahim al-Shami), owner of the Al-Maks tannery in Alexandria, is disappointed in his sons Khalil (Hussein al-Imam) and Khamis (Hadi el-Gayar), for their failure to graduate from school and join the family business. Lonely and dreaming of a son and worthy advisor-successor, he falls in love with his servant Firdaws (Hoda Sultan), who bears him a son named Hamada. Hajji keeps threatening to bequeath his wealth to the golden boy Hamada, but the enraged Khalil incites Khamis to poison Hajj’s food with arsenic and frame Firdaws, succeeding on both counts with Hamada in their clutches and Firdaws imprisoned for twenty years.

Khalil orders Khamis to take Hamada to Cairo and abandon him in the crowd. In the Al-Hussain neighborhood, Khamis leaves Hamada but watches him cautiously, until a teacher named Younes al-Saftawi (Salah Mansour) finds him and takes him home to the Al-Jamaliah neighborhood. Quickly realizing that Hamada has no family with good intentions remaining, al-Saftawi takes him to an orphanage and pledges to visit regularly.

Hamada (Mohamed Tharwat) grows up in the orphanage and joins its Conservatory, where he excels at music and falls in love with his colleague Souad (Mona Gabr), while Khalil and Khamis squander their wealth on wine, women, and gambling as the tannery’s debts mount. They are ultimately forced to sell the business to pay down the debts, and the buyer is none other than Tafaida al-Halawani, Hajji's cousin and Souad's mother. Khlail ends up paralyzed and begging in front of Alexandria's Abu al-Abbas al-Mursi Mosque, while Khamis makes a living as a squeegee man and panhandling on the streets. Firdaws is released after 15 years in prison, but she is rejected by Tafaida and therefore stays with a friend (Ragaa Youssef). Inquiring about her son's whereabouts, she hears from Khamis that he is with Younes, who is on Hajj. Hamada asks Tafaida for her daughter Souad's hand in marriage, but she refuses, so Hamada summons Younes to advocate on his behalf. Firdaws encounters Younes on return from Hajj, and he leads her to Hamada's graduation party at the Conservatory, at which she reunites with her son and meets Tafaida and Souad; Hamada, who just prior got a note from Younes not to seek him again, is overjoyed at the reunion.

== Production ==
Actor Salah Mansour died during filming on January 19, 1979, requiring director Hassan al-Imam to edit down his role in the film. Mansour was admitted to the hospital in the Agouza neighborhood of Cairo and spent his last days beside his wife and his eldest son Majdi. According to her, his last words were "Do not cry, for I have lived my life and hate to see tears in your eyes, which I will not be able to behold after I die". He was 56, and his widow was granted an unusually large pension, given their modest means, by President Anwar Sadat.

== Reception ==
Mahmoud Kassem argued in his 2018 book الفيلم الغنائي في السينما المصرية (The Musical Film in Egyptian Cinema) that:

Ebn meen fel mogtamaa marked a turning point in Egyptian film musicals, in which director Hassan al-Imam tried to launch a new generation of singers to replace the late Abdel Halim Hafez [who died in 1979]. Mohamed Tharwat, in his film debut, seemed a promising candidate to relaunch al-Imam’s formula in a modern context. However, the film was a box-office disappointment, and Tharwat soon left the silver screen for television.

Nevertheless, songs from the score like "يا اللي مالوش غيرك حما" (“Oh, Hama, I Have No Protection But You”) were popular.
