= Truth Has a Voice =

- الكروان له شفايف
- Directed by: Hassan al-Imam
- Written by: Jules Mary(story); Hassan al-Imam (script and dialogue)
- Starring: Soheir Ramzi; Yousuf Shaaban; Nabila Ebeid; Samir Sabri; Hayat Kandel; Emad Hamdy; Abu Bakr Ezzat; Enaam Salousa; Naima al-Saghir; Farouk Naguib; Walid Toufic
- Cinematography: Wahid Farid
- Edited by: Salah Abdel Razek
- Music by: Moody el-Imam; Hussein al-Imam
- Production company: Saif Films
- Distributed by: Ihab el-Leithy Films (domestic); Sadiq al-Sabbah’s Cedars Art Productions (international)
- Release date: December 20, 1976
- Running time: 115 minutes
- Country: Egypt
- Language: Arabic

Truth Has a Voice (Arabic: الكروان له شفايف, translit. “Al-Karawan Loh Shafayef”) is an Egyptian drama film released in 1976. It was directed by Hassan al-Imam as a kind of remake of his earlier 1951 release حكم القوى (“The Powers That Be”), starring Mohsen Sarhan and Huda Sultan. The 1976 edition features a screenplay based on a novel by French author Jules Mary with Egyptian dialogue localized by al-Imam. Soheir Ramzi, Nabila Ebeid, Yousuf Shaaban, and Samir Sabri star in a tale of a song-and-dance troupe mired in massive debt. The theatre company stumbles into a mystery when one of the leaders is found by another murdered after a dispute with a lender. The film premiered in Egyptian theaters on December 20, 1976.

== Cast ==
- Soheir Ramzi (Karawan)
- Nabila Ebeid (Dalal)
- Samir Sabri (Hussein Ramzy)
- Yousuf Shaaban (Qassem)
- Emad Hamdy (Rostom, a lawyer)
- Hayat Kandel (Shareefa)
- Naima al-Saghir (Tafaida, a loan shark)
- Abu Bakr Ezzat (Ezz el-Din, a Public Prosecutor)
- Enaam Salousa (Khayriyah Abdelhamid, Rostom’s paralegal assistant)
- Khadija Mahmoud (Tafaida’s assistant)
- Farida Saif Al-Nasr (secretary of the troupe)
- Mahmoud el-Gendy (secretary of the troupe)
- Walid Toufic (lead singer of the troupe)
- Issam Waheed (master of ceremonies of the troupe)
- Farouk Naguib (dancer in the troupe)
- Rabab
- Hussein Arar

== Synopsis ==
Love blossoms between Hussein Ramzy (Samir Sabri) and Dalal (Nabila Ebeid), but a quarrel separates them and he leaves to study directing abroad, returning to find Dalal married to his friend, the troupe’s lawyer Rostom (Emad Hamdy). Hussein starts a song-and-dance troupe starring singer-dancer Karawan (Soheir Ramzi), who dates Qassem (Yousuf Shaaban), whom she knew at a nightclub where she performed raqs sharqi. Hussein, for his part, falls in love with his colleague Shareefa (Hayat Kandel) and marries her. Qassem turns to a loan shark named Tafaida (Naima al-Saghir), who had previously helped pay his bills, to fund the group, but Hussein’s old-fashioned artistic sensibilities don’t connect with the public and they struggle to pay their debts. Qassem breaks the partnership and dates Tafaida, who comes to the theatre to collect payment. Hussein offers a partnership contract to Tafaida with the imprimatur of Rostom and the entire treasury of the band as collateral, but she refuses.

Qassem visits Tafaida, who lives across the street from Hussein’s house. Shareefa mistakes Qassem for Hussein when she spots him. Tafaida realizes Qassem’s treachery and kicks her out of the house, but not before he strikes and kills her. He seizes her belongings and leaves, then when Hussein comes home, Sharifa thinks he is the killer.

Public Prosecutor Ezz el-Din (Abu Bakr Ezzat) begins to investigate Tafaida’s murder and arrests Hussein, who is represented by his lawyer Rostam. Dalal admits that she was with Hussein, and Karawan points the finger at Qassem given the sudden appearance of the money. Threatened with exposure, Qassem confesses before the court and is arrested while Hussein is let go and reestablishes the band.

== Reception ==
Mahmoud Kassem wrote in an article for Al-Shorouk that

In the 1970s, more than a quarter-century into his career, Hassan al-Imam decided to re-direct many of his earlier films…The main literary source was Roger la Honte, [published in 1886] by the French author Jules Mary. However, [the 1976 film] is in fact closer in its plot to Witness for the Prosecution, the 1957 Billy Wilder film starring Charles Lawton and Marlene Dietrich, in turn based on Agatha Christie’s 1953 stage production of her 1925 short story of the same name. Of course, the crimes depicted differ greatly from those in the 1951 film.
