= I Love This, I Want That =

- هذا أحبه وهذا أريده
- Directed by: Hassan al-Imam
- Written by: Ihsan Abdel Quddous(story, scenario, and dialogue); Morsi Gameel Aziz (scenario and dialogue); Murad Ramses Naguib (scenario and dialogue); Hassan al-Imam (scenario and dialogue)
- Produced by: Murad Ramses Naguib
- Starring: Hany Shaker; Noura Qadry; Hamdi Hafith Moshira Ismail; Eglal Zaki; Saeed Saleh; Sabri Abdel Aziz
- Cinematography: Wahid Farid (chief cinematographer); Essam Farid (photographer)
- Edited by: Nadia Shoukry
- Music by: Elias Rahbani
- Production company: Murad Films
- Release date: July 14, 1975
- Running time: 120 minutes
- Country: Egypt
- Language: Arabic

I Love This, I Want That (Arabic: هذا أحبه وهذا أريده) is an Egyptian romantic drama musical film released on July 14, 1975. It was directed by Hassan al-Imam, features a story by Ihsan Abdel Quddous and additional scripting by al-Imam, Murad Ramses Naguib, and lyricist-poet Morsi Gameel Aziz. The film stars Hany Shaker, Noura Qadry, and Hamdi Hafith. In the film, somewhat resembling the plot of Cyrano de Bergerac, Ahmed and Ashraf both love Salwa, but Ashraf communicates only through love letters which Ahmed calls her and claims to have written.

== Cast ==
- Hany Shaker (Ahmed, a famous young singer)
- Noura Qadry (Salwa, a dancer and singer in a performing troupe)
- Hamdi Hafith (Ashraf, Ahmed's friend)
- Saeed Saleh (Kamal, an advice columnist)
- Eglal Zaki (Zizi, Salwa's friend)
- Moshira Ismail (Noha Mahmoud, Salwa's friend)
- Leila Saboundji (Salwa's mother)
- Sabri Abdel Aziz (Ashraf's father)
- Younes Shalaby
- Hoda Abdel Wahab
- Amira Fouad
- Khaled Amin Hassanein (child)

== Synopsis ==
A young singer named Ahmed (Hany Shaker) discovers that his friend Ashraf (Hamdi Hafith) has fallen in love with a beautiful young woman named Salwa Murad (Noura Qadry). Ashraf hasn't spoken to her but has sent her 28 sincere love letters. Ahmed advises Ashraf to just call her but he refuses, as Salwa has fallen in love with the mysterious author. Ahmed goes to an advice columnist friend of his named Kamal (Saeed Saleh) for advice, to which Kamal assures him Ashraf should talk to her. Ahmed pays Ashraf's phone bill to call her, but Ashraf is traumatized by his mother's divorce from his father (Sabri Abdel Aziz) by phone and refuses to speak. Ahmed has a friend his age call Salwa while Ashraf listens in. Salwa and her friend Noha (Moshira Ismail) take a technology test and recognize the proctor as the caller. Ahmed calls her again and they forge a real-life bond. When the three meet and the truth is revealed, Ahmed proposes to Salwa. They marry, but Ashraf continues sending letters to Salwa, which Salwa finds innocuous contrary to an infuriated Ahmed. She considers the relationship in the letters as spiritual and tells Ahmed “it should be secret, like prayer.” Ahmed asks her to tear them up and does it himself when she refuses, slaps her, and goes to Ashraq's house to find him drawing a portrait of her. Ashraf tells Ahmed Salwa has two husband's one in flesh and blood and the other in spirit, leading Ahmed to angrily threaten divorce. Ashraf turns to Kamal, who tells him that loving someone body but not soul or vice versa is unnatural and has Ashraf call her to say he will not stand in the way of her relationship with Ahmed.

== Songs ==
Songs in score
Title	Lyricist	Composer	Arranger
يا عشاق النبي (“Oh, Lovers of the Prophet!”)	Sayed Darwish	Sayed Darwish	Fouad el-Zahery
يا ورد على فل وياسمين (“Oh, Jasmine Rose!”)	Sayed Darwish	Sayed Darwish	Fouad el-Zahery
يا سميري (“Oh, Samiri”)	Ibrahim al-Aryan	Ibrahim al-Aryan	Fouad el-Zahery
سوق الهوى (“Souk El Hawa”)	Hussein Al-Sayed Al-Azab	Mohamed El Mougy	
حلو الحب (“Sweet Love”)	Mohamed Hamza	Elias Rahbani	
إتحرك (“Etharak” or “Move”)	Sayed Morsi	Helmy Bakr	

== Production ==
According to a recollection published by the culture website Diwan al-Arab, lyricist Mohamed Hamza recalled the following:

While I Love This, I Want That, co-starring Hany Shaker and Noura Qadry, was in production, producer Murad Ramses Naguib asked me to write lyrics to Elias Rahbani’s tune. At the time, an arts magazine had published an interview with Hany Shaker in which he had insulted [Hamza’s friend] Abdel Halim Hafez, leading me to apologize to Hafez for writing it. To my surprise, he told me to enjoy the chance to meet Rahbani. While the song was being recorded, I asked Shaker “Why did you attack your fan?” Shaker denied having said the snide remarks and contacted Hafez to clarify the misquote, earning an invitation by a relieved Hafez to dinner at the latter’s house.

An article in the Moroccan newspaper Assahifa Al Ousbouia similarly recounts that:

As Hany Shaker’s star rose as a singer, rumors spread of a rivalry as Shaker sought to usurp Abdel Halim Hafez’s perch as the king of Arab popular song. He soon put the kibosh on this, saying “All that was published on my tongue is a falsehood concocted by the press to gain fame at the expense of my friendship with the great singing star Abdel Halim Hafez.” Shaker was convinced that he was a singing star rather than a movie star after his turn in [1966 biographical film about the titular Sayed Darwish] Sayed Darwish. Fate had other plans, including a starring role in I Love This, I Want That, which co-starred Noura Qadry and led to rumors of an off-screen romance. The love rumors went the way of the hate ones as he was revealed to be engaged to a decided non-actress women named Nahla Tawfik, with whom he has a son and daughter.

== Reception ==
The news site Akhbarak conveyed an assessment of the film's legacy as follows:

All Murad Ramses Naguib’s efforts to pair Abdel Halim Hafez and Soad Hosny on film in the years preceding 1975 had failed, so for the first time he presented Noura Qadry and Hany Shaker together and assigned popular director Hassan al-Imam to the film. Although al-Imam left due to production problems, Ramses Naguib was pleased with the results so far and stepped into the director’s chair himself, an unprecedented development in Egyptian cinema. The film’s success was dwarfed by that of Qadry herself, who was nicknamed her first name Noura and became an It girl of Arab media, named Miss Egyptian Cinema by Lebanese media magazine Al-Mawed from 1986 to 1991.

According to London newspaper Al-Quds Al-Arabi:

Hany Shaker was unlucky on the silver screen, partly due to the decline of the musical films that proliferated in the mid-20th century [in Egypt]. In 1975, however, he starred in the film I Love This, I Want That, together with Noura Qadry. The script and dialogue were written by the late, prolific poet Morsi Gameel Aziz, whose sole venture beyond lyrics was prompted by a firm belief in Shaker’s talent. The film also was buoyed by the direction of the iconic Hassan al-Imam and the music of Elias Rahbani.
