= El-Emam family =

Egyptian noble family

El-Emam الإمام
- Noble Family
- Country: Egypt
- Founded: 901
- Founder: Abu Uday el-Masry bin el-Emam
- Titles: Amir al-Hajj, Sheikh al-Islam, Sheikh Sheiokh Misr, Emir, Judge of El Mahalla El Kubra, Judge of Samannud, supervisor of Endowments, supervisor of Special, supervisor of Armies, Secret Writer, Judge of the sultan's diwan, Mayor of Mit el-Sheyoukh, Mayor of Mit Tarif
- Estates: El-Emam Palace, Kafr Tasfa, Kafr Shukr Center, Qalyubia Governorate (historical stronghold)
- A prominent position in politics, arts and judiciary

The El-Emam family, sometimes spelled el-Imam (Arabic: عائلة الإمام, آل الإمام), is an Egyptian noble family which has had prominent members since the Abbasid era, through the Fatimid, Ayyubid and Mamluk era. To this day they still have influence.

== Overview, history and name ==
The total known history of the family goes back 1,400 years. The founder of the family is Sheikh al-Islam Abu Uday el-Masry bin el-Emam (903 - May 31, 991). He was the first to be called the "ibn el-Emam". He was the sheikh sheiokh (sheikh of sheikhs) of Egypt and their support in the Abbasid and then Fatimid era. Sheikh el-Masry's lineage dates back 300 years, making the known family history 1,400 years old. It is an Egyptian lineage that indicates that the family's origin is Coptic.

In the eras that followed the death of Abu Uday el-Masry ibn el-Emam, members of the family rose to many high positions, most of which were in the judiciary, specifically in the Mamluk era, which witnessed the golden age of the el-Emam's family, through their assuming most of the deputies and judicial positions in Egypt. Until they reached the top of the political and military pyramid during the reign of Sultan Qansuh al-Ghuri, in which two of the el-Emam's family were in power, namely Emir (prince) Alaa el-Din bin el-Emam and his brother, Judge Saad el-Din bin el-Emam. Prince Alaa el-Din bin el-Emam held 5 major positions at the same time (supervisor of Special, Amir al-Hajj, supervisor of Endowments, supervisor of the Armies, Secret Writer of the Sultanate), This is in addition to the fact that Prince Alaa el-Din was nicknamed Abu el-ostool (father of the fleet) because he was the one who was entrusted by Sultan al-Ghuri with the task of building a new Egyptian fleet. He built a modern and strong fleet, and assumed command of the fleet for a period. Then he went to the Hejaz and achieved impressive military achievements against the rebellious Arabs there. This in addition to his architectural establishment there, especially in the Badr region, in which he rebuilt the holy Badr well. His brother, Saad el-Din bin el-Emam, was the judge of the Sultan's Diwan and also one of the Sultan's closest men, like his brother.

After the fall of the Mamluk Sultanate of Egypt into the hands of the Ottomans, specifically in the eighteenth century, the el-Emam family took control of a number of major positions areas in Damietta and Dakahlia, the most famous of which are the areas of Mit el-Sheyoukh and Mit Tarif, which are governed by the el-Emam family to this day.

== Notable members ==
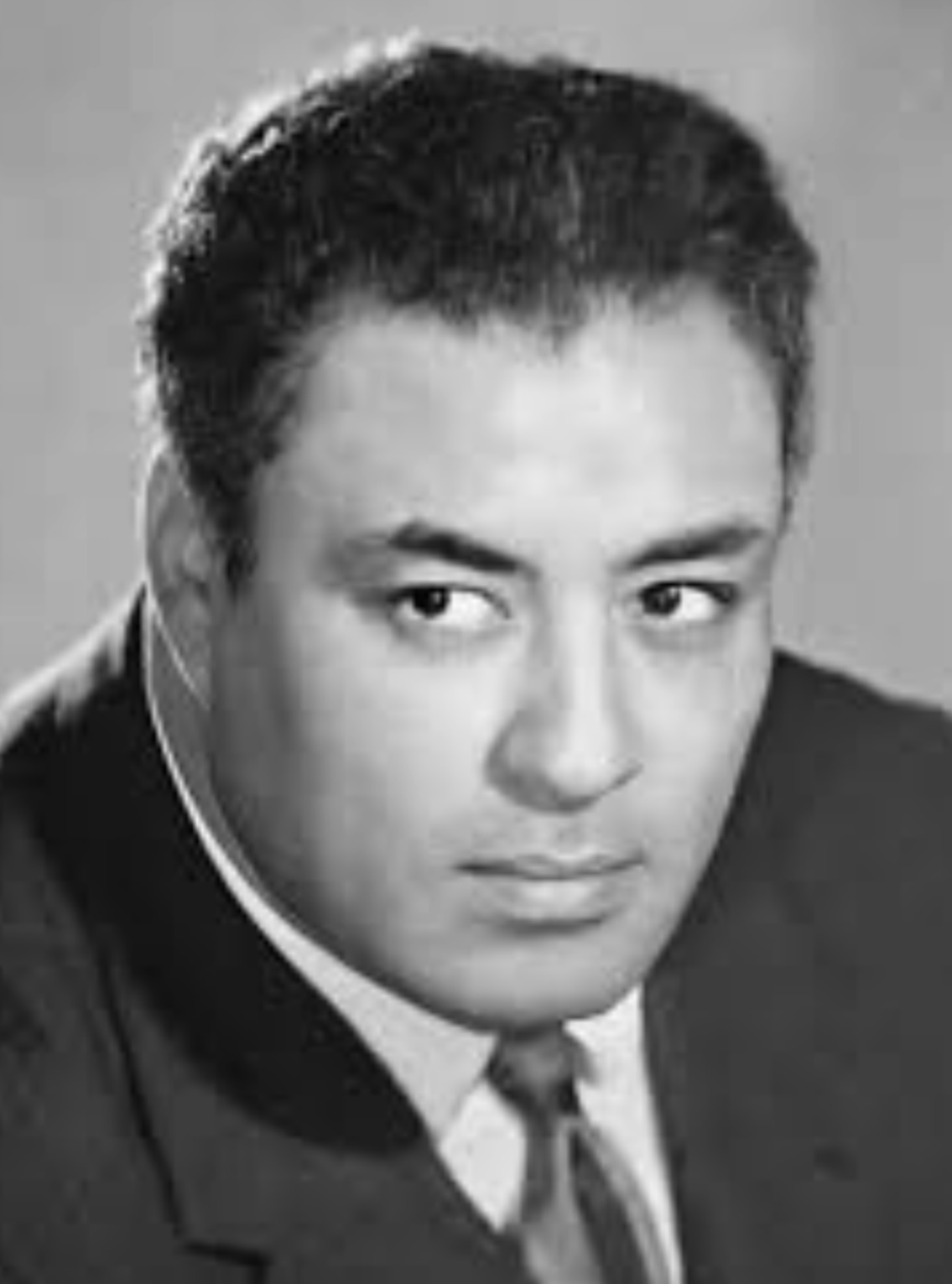
Hassan El-Emam

- Abu Uday el-Masry bin el-Emam: the founder, sheikh al-Islam, sheikh al-sheiokh of Egypt and their supporter in the Abbasid and Fatimid eras.
- Judge El-Mohib bin el-Emam: Judge of El Mahalla El Kubra, the deputy of Qadi al-Qoudah (Chief Justice) and a religious scholar.
- Prince Alaa el-Din bin el-Emam: Amir al-Hajj, supervisor of Endowments, supervisor of the Armies, supervisor of Special, Secret Writer, founder of the updated Egyptian naval fleet.
- Hassan el-Imam: Film director.
- Hussein el-Imam: Actor.
- Yassin Elemam : currently attending a school in London he is widely regarded as a leader of the family
- Helmy Elemam currently attending a school in London

== Location ==
Their historical stronghold was the el-Emam's Palace in Kafr Tasfa, Kafr Shukr Center, Qalyubia Governorate in Egypt, and they have a presence in the following governorates:

- Dakahlia Governorate.
- Damietta Governorate.
- Qalyubiyya Governorate.
- Gharbia Governorate.
- Beheira Governorate.
- Cairo Governorate.
