= El-Mohib bin el-Emam =

Egyptian Islamic scholar and judge (1386 – 1442)

Personal life
- Born: 1386, El-Mahalla El-Kubra, Egyptian Sultanate.
- Died: 1442, Cairo, Egyptian Sultanate.
- Era: Middle Ages
- Main interest(s): Hadith, Quran, Sharia, Fiqh

Religious life
- Religion: Islam
- Denomination: Sunni
- Jurisprudence: Shafi'i
- Profession: Judge, Imam, religious scholar

Abdullah bin Abdul Latif bin Ahmad bin Mahammad bin Abi Bakr bin Abdullah bin Abdul Mohsen el-Mohib Abu el-Tayeb bin el-Baha Abi el-Baqa bin el-Shihab Abu el-Abbas el-Sulami el-Mahli el-Shafi'i bin el-Emam (Arabic: عبد الله بن عبد اللطيف بن أحمد بن محمد بن أبي بكر بن عبد الله بن عبد المحسن المحب أبو الطيب بن البهاء أبي البقاء بن الشهاب أبو العباس السلمي المحلي الشافعي بن الإمام; 1386 – 1442), commonly known as El-Mohib bin el-Emam (المحب بن الإمام), was an Egyptian judge and religious scholar from the Egyptian el-Emam family.

== Early life and education ==
El-Mohib bin el-Emam was born in one of the houses of the el-Emam family in the city of the El-Mahalla El-Kubra, Egyptian Sultanate, in the year 1386 in a house of knowledge, as is the custom in most of the homes of the el-Emam family. His father was the judge of El-Mahalla El-Kubra, Judge Abdul Latif bin el-Emam, and he was a great and famous religious scholar, and his brother was the judge of Samannud, Judge Abu Bakr bin el-Emam.

El-Mohib bin el-Emam grew up with a good religious upbringing. He recited the Qur’an and recited it to Abi Amr Ali Al-Shihab Al-Nashrati Al-Haysob. Then he made a pilgrimage to the Sacred house of Allah with his brother Abu Bakr bin el-Emam and his father when he was 16 years old in the year 1402. He also studied and stayed at the Kaaba for some time. He studied the Alfiat al-Hadith by al-Hafidh al-'Iraqi and Matan Ash Shatibiyyah by Abu Muhammad Al-Shatibi.

After that, El-Mohib bin el-Emam returned to El-Mahalla El-Kubra, where he studied Fiqh and studied under Al-Baha Abu Al-Baqa Al-Shishini Al-Qadi, Al-Shihab Al-Barini and others, and in grammar, he studied under Al-Badr Hussein Al-Maghribi and others. He would frequent Cairo to seek knowledge and teach, and among his teachers were Al-Shihab Al-Wasiti and others. El-Mohib became one of the greatest and most famous Egyptian religious scholars of his time. He was a scholar of Fiqh, hadith, grammar, and other legal sciences.

== Career ==
In the year 1426, Judge El-Mohib bin el-Emam moved to Cairo to participate in the campaign of judges and sheikhs calling on all Egyptians to volunteer in the war to conquer Cyprus. After that, El-Mohib bin el-Emam visited Palestine and visited the cities of Jerusalem and Hebron. In Hebron, he got to know Sheikh Al-Shihab Al-Mardini. Then he visited Damietta, Alexandria, and others, along with Al-Biqa’i and others, and he frequented them before that. After El-Mohib bin el-Emam became one of the most famous judges and scholars of Egypt, the Sultan of Egypt el-Ashraf Barsbay, as deputy to Chief Justice Galal el-Din el-Balqini, and he became the judge of El-Mahalla El-Kubra.

== Death ==
After a great academic career and spreading justice and goodness, Judge El-Muhib bin el-Emam died in the year 1442 in the capital of the Egyptian Sultanate, Cairo, during the reign of Sultan Jaqmaq.

== Legacy ==
Historian Shams al-Din al-Sakhawi says about Judge El-Mohib bin el-Emam:

“He was trustworthy, good, and humble. He represented the judiciary in some of the lands of Mahalla on behalf of Galal el-Balqini and those after him. Ibn Fahd and al-Buqa’i read to him and described him as the sheikh, imam, scholar, and righteous person and others. He died on Wednesday, the second of Dhu al-Hijjah in the year 64, in Cairo, may God have mercy on him and us.”

== See also ==
- Abu Uday el-Masry bin el-Emam.
- Alaa el-Din bin el-Emam.
