= Isnit =

Isnit أسنيت
- Location in Egypt
- Coordinates: 30.532102°N 31.249995°E
- Country: Egypt
- Governorate: Qalyubia Governorate
- Time zone: UTC+2 (EET)
  - Summer (DST): UTC+3 (EEST)

Isnit (Arabic: أسنيت) is a village in markaz Kafr Shukr, Qalyubia Governorate, Egypt.
