= Abu Uday el-Masry bin el-Emam =

Egyptian Islamic scholar and judge (903 – 991)

Abdel Aziz bin Ali bin Ahmad bin Mahammad bin Ishaq bin el-Farag Abu Uday el-Masry bin el-Emam Sheikh of Islam
- Title: Shaykh al-Islām; Assad al-Sunnah wa al-Jama'a; Sheikh al-Sheiokh

Personal life
- Born: 903, Tulunid Emirate of Egypt
- Died: 31 May 991, Cairo, Fatimid Caliphate of Egypt
- Era: Middle Ages
- Region: Cairo, Egypt
- Main interest(s): Hadith, Quran, Sharia, Fiqh

Religious life
- Religion: Islam
- Denomination: Sunni
- Jurisprudence: Shafi'i
- Profession: Judge, Sheikh of Islam, religious scholar

Muslim leader
- Influenced by: * Abu el-Qasim Ali bin Hassan Khalaf bin Qudayd el-Masry * Muhammad bin Zayan bin Habib Abi Bakr Al-Hadrami * Abu Bakr Abdullah bin Malik bin Abdullah Al-Tajibi “Ibn Saif Abdullah” * Abu Al-Hassan Ismail bin Abdullah bin Amr Al-Tajibi Al-Nakhas
- Influenced: * Abu Jaafar Ahmed bin Muhammad Al-Umawi Al-Talilit *Abdul-Jabbar bin Ahmed bin Omar bin Al-Hasan Al-Tarsusi Abi Al-Qasim * Abi Al-Fath Faris bin Ahmed bin Musa Al-Homsi * Ismail bin Amr bin Ismail bin Rashid el-Haddad “Abu Mahammad el-Masry”

Abdel Aziz bin Ali bin Ahmad bin Mahammad bin Ishaq bin el-Farag Abu Uday el-Masry bin el-Emam (Egyptian Arabic: عبد العزيز بن علي بن أحمد بن محمد بن إسحاق بن الفرج أبو عدي المصري بن الإمام) (31 – 903 May 991), commonly known as Abu Uday el-Masry bin el-Emam and nicknamed Sheikh al-Islam (Egyptian Arabic: شيخ الإسلام, lit. 'Sheikh of Islam') and Assad al-Sunnah wa al-Jama'a (Egyptian Arabic: أسد السنة و الجماعة, lit. 'Lion of the Sunnah and companions'), was an Egyptian judge, religious scholar and Sheikh of Islam and is considered one of the famous judges and religious scholars in Egypt during the Abbasid and Fatimid eras.

He is the first to bear the name 'bin el-Emam'. It is the name of the el-Emam family, a noble Egyptian family from which many judges and princes appeared in the Middle Ages. To this day, it is considered one of the largest and noble Egyptian families. el -Emam is considered the founder of the el-Emam family and is the ancestor of the famous Egyptian prince Alaa el-Din bin el-Emam, one of the most famous and powerful princes of the Egyptian Sultanate.

== Early life ==
Abu Uday, or Abdel Aziz, was born in the el-Emam's family home in Egypt in the year 903, that is, in the late era of the first Egyptian Emirate. His father was an imam and a great Egyptian sheikh who had his say.

== Accomplishments ==
Judge Abu Uday el-Masry bin el-Emam is considered one of the most famous sheikhs of the Sunnah and the group in the Fatimid era, in addition to the fact that he was in the position of Sheikh of the Sheikhs of the reciters of Egypt and the Musnad of the reciters of Egypt, he had noble attempts to confront the attempts to Shiite Egypt at the hands of the ruling Fatimid family at the time. The Sunnis and the group in Egypt considered him a brave hero and their representative.

Judge Abu Uday el-Masry bin el-Emam became famous throughout the Islamic world and was known for his abundant knowledge and good reputation, which made Egypt a destination for Muslim scholars, especially religious scholars.

Judge Abu Uday bin el-Imam is considered the one who completed the transmission of Warsh bin Nafi's narration to read the Holy Qur’an to the people of the Islamic Maghreb, who use Warsh bin Nafi's narration to this day. So he recorded the recitation of Warsh bin Nafi’ and recited it to many sheikhs who transmitted it to the Maghreb with its correct pronunciation. The most famous of them was Sheikh Ahmed bin Nafis, who would read the narration with its correct pronunciation to Sheikh bin Al-Fahham, who would support it.

Abu Uday also narrated many hadiths of the Prophet A large number of sheikhs heard from him Such as Ali bin Qadid and Muhammad bin Zaban. A number of people also narrated the hadith from him, including Sheikh Yahya bin Al-Tahan.

== Death ==
After a great and busy career, Judge Abu Uday Abdel Aziz bin Al-Imam died on May 31, 991 during the reign of the Egyptian Caliph el-Aziz Billah, at the age of 88.

== Legacy ==
Imam Shams al-Din al-Dhahabi said about him:

"He is the highest through whom I read the Qur’an.”

Ibn al-Jazari said about him:

“Abu Uday was a reciter and hadith narrator, a leader, an officer, the sheikh of the sheikhs of Egypt and their supporter, and he was a pious and honest sheikh.”

== See also ==
- Alaa el-Din bin el-Emam
- El-Mohib bin el-Emam
