= Kaboria =

- Arabic: كابوريا
- Directed by: Khairy Beshara
- Written by: Issam Al-Shamaa
- Produced by: Hussein El-Imam
- Starring: Ahmed Zaki; Raghda; Hussein El-Imam
- Cinematography: Mohsen Ahmed
- Edited by: Ahmed Metwally
- Music by: Hussein El-Imam
- Production company: El-Imam Star (Hussein El-Imam)
- Distributed by: Tamido Film Production and Distribution; Cinematheque 88
- Release date: 27 August 1990 (Egypt)
- Running time: 110 minutes
- Country: Egypt
- Language: Egyptian Arabic

Kaboria (Egyptian Arabic: كابوريا, English: "Crabs") is a 1990 Egyptian boxing film directed by Khairy Beshara It stars Ahmed Zaki, Raghda, Hussein El-Imam. The film is written by Issam Al-Shamaa. The film tells the story of Hassan Hodhud, a poor boxer who dreams of titles and glory. By chance, he participates in a match in the palace of a wealthy man. The audience admires him, he gets a large financial return, and then, he moves to live in the palace. The film's cast also includes Cate Blanchett in her film debut as an extra.

Kaboria was theatrically released in Egypt on August 27, 1990, by Tamido Film Production and Distribution (Medhat El Sherif). It received positive reviews from critics and achieved a great financial success. Ahmed Zaki's haircut in the film was known as "Kaboria" and was widely popular among youngsters in Egypt. The character of Hassan Hodhud is actually real, and Ahmed Zaki stayed with him for about two weeks to master it.

== Plot ==
Hassan Hodhud is a poor young man who loves boxing, and dreams with his friends Mahmoud and Mustafa to reach the Olympics. Hassan and his friends pass by the float of the millionaire, Suleiman, so his wife, Horreya, invites them to participate in boxing matches in their elegant palace in exchange for attractive financial rewards.

While Hassan Hodhud’s matches with his other young competitors are subject to imaginary bets between Horreya and Suleiman, Hassan achieves impressive victories to get huge money rewards. He moves to live in Suleiman's Palace, where Horreya seeks to seduce him, but he rejects her, so she pronounces him and decides to avenge her dignity. Hassan discovers that he has become a puppet that both Suleiman and his wife Horreya tamper with, so he throws what he has earned in their face and abandons wealth and palaces to return to the popular neighborhood in which he resides, starting again in new rounds of boxing, content with the looks of his beloved.

== Cast ==
- Ahmed Zaki as Hassan Hodhud
- Raghda as Horeyya
- Hussein El-Imam as Suleiman
- Sahar Rami as Noor
- Shafiq Galal as Aziz
- Mohamed Lotfy as Mahmoud
- Youssef Dawoud as Captain
- Hassan Hussein as Nono
- Ann El-Tork as Amar
- Nabaweya Saeed as Dalala
- Ahmed Shatta as Antar
- Mohammed Ali Abdelghany as Mostafa
- Cate Blanchett as Extra in a dancing scene

== Staff ==
- Written by: Issam El-Shamaa
- Directed by: Khairy Beshara
- Cinematography: Mohsen Ahmed
- Editing: Ahmed Metwally
- Produced by: Hussein El-Imam
- Soundtrack: Hussein El-Imam
- Production studio: El Imam Star (Hussein El-Imam)
- Internal distribution: Tamido Film Production and Distribution (Medhat El Sherif)
- External Distribution: Cinematheque 88

== See also ==
- Cinema of Egypt
- List of boxing films
- List of Egyptian films of 1990
- List of Egyptian films of the 1990s
