= Hassan el-Imam =

Egyptian film director (1919–1988)

Hassan El-Imam
- حسن الإمام
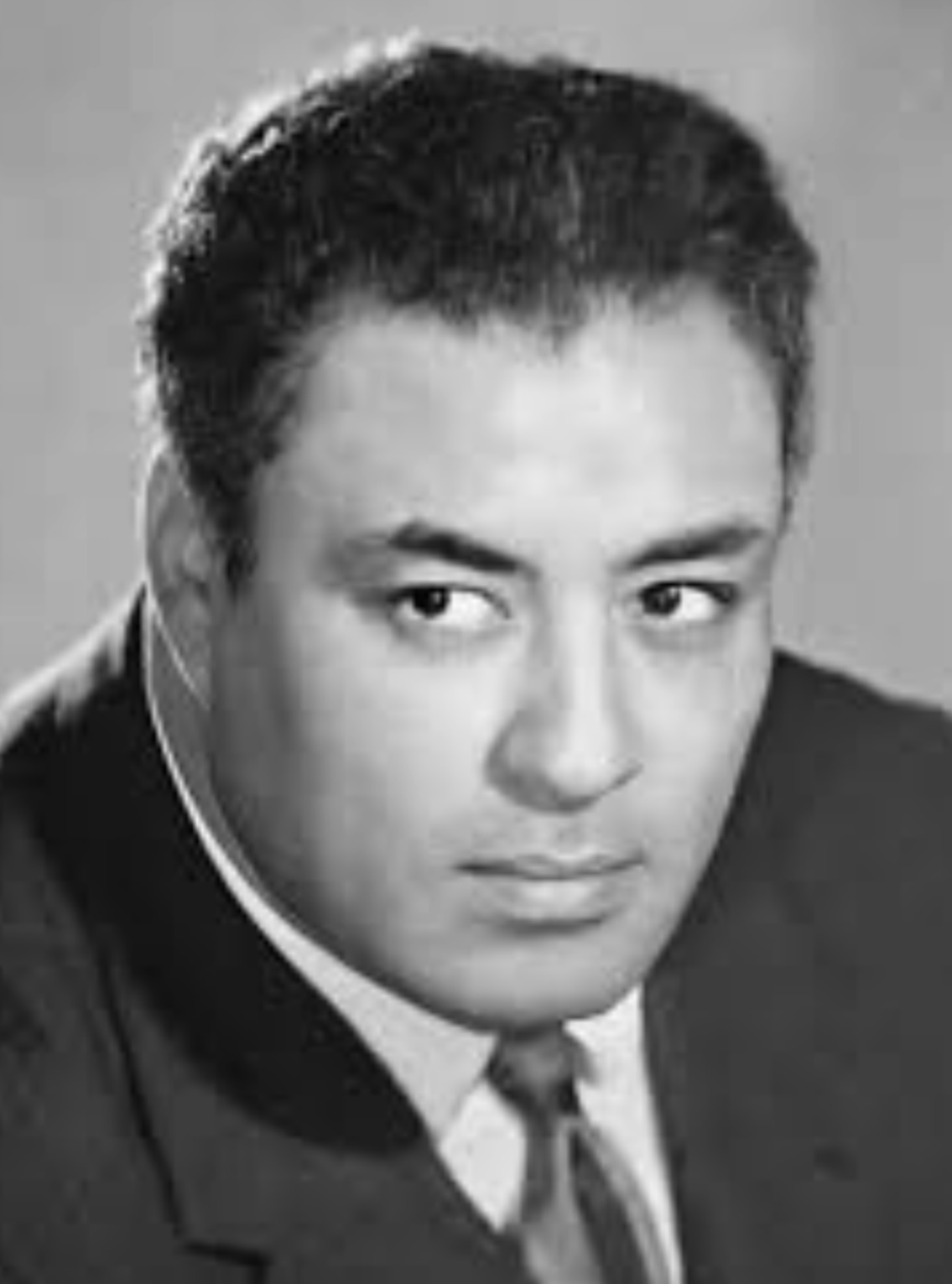
- El-Imam in 1964
- Born: حسن الإمام محمد الإمام; March 6, 1919; Mansoura, Egypt
- Died: January 29, 1988 (aged 68); Cairo, Egypt
- Occupation: Film Director
- Years active: 1946–1986
- Title: Box-office King
- Children: 3, including Hussein
- Family: El-Emam family

Hassan el-Imam (Arabic: حسن الإمام ‘Hassan Al Imam, ‘Hassan El-Emam; March 6, 1919, in Mansoura, Egypt – January 29, 1988) was a prominent Egyptian film director. He was nicknamed the Box-office King.

== Early life ==
Hassan El-Imam was born on March 6, 1919, in the city of Mansoura, his father El-Imam pasha El-Imam was a wealthy businessman and part of the el-Imam family. Hassan El-Imam was persistent, open-minded, and interested in public events, especially in theatrical art events, due to the proliferation of theaters at that time, and the lack of widespread cinema. He was also a lover of music. He received his education at the Frere School in al-Kharnfash, in Cairo.

== Career ==
Hassan El-Imam began his career in the 1940s, and worked as an assistant director in a number of films such as Muhammad Ali Street, Hassan and Hassan, and Miss Boussa. He got his first directing opportunity in 1946 with his first film, Angels in Hell (1947). In the following year, he directed the films; Women are Devils (1948), and The Fame and the Rich (1948). His real breakthrough came in the early 1950s, was the films; The Two Orphans (1949), followed by; Calumnied by the People (1950), I am Well Born (1951), Time of Miracles (1952), and I will never Cry (1957).

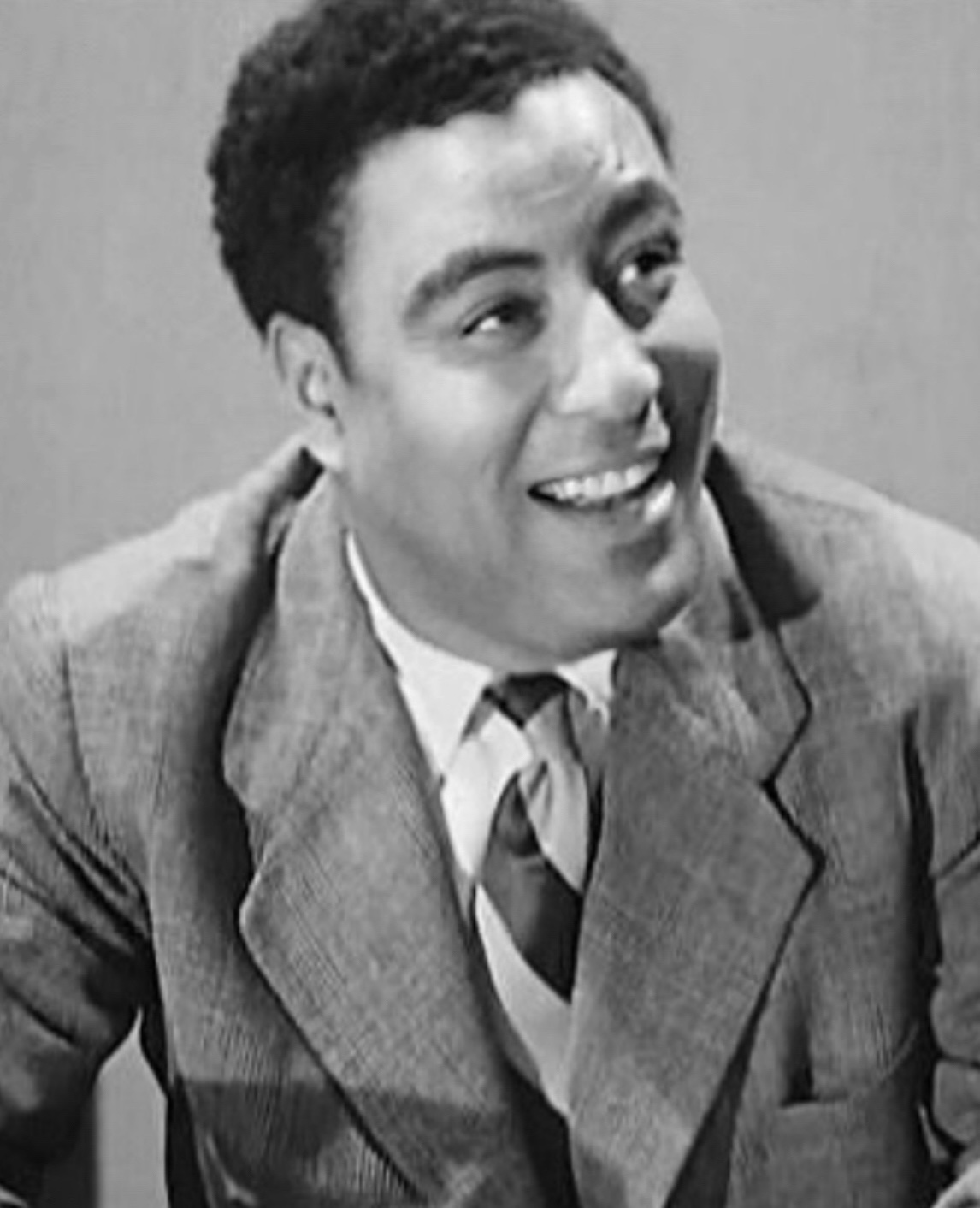
Hassan el-Imam in 1952

El-Imam films achieved high box-office revenues, which made him nicknamed "Box-office King" and "Director of masterpieces". In the 1960s, he directed the films; The Sins (1962), Alley of the Pestle (1963), and the Naguib Mahfouz's Cairo trilogy adaptation: Between Al-Qasrayn (1963), Qasr Al-Shawq (1967) and Al-Sukkariyyah (1973). He also presented: Love and Adoration (1960), I Accuse (1960), and Money and Women (1960), The Dumb (1961), The Student (1961), The Miracle (1962), Shafiqa the Copt-girl (1963), The Nun (1965) among others. In the 1970s, Al-Imam presented Love and Pride (1972) and gave up a little on melodrama films to present other genres.

After the tremendous success of Watch Out for Zouzou (1972) and its continuation in theaters for over a year, his films were dominated by a lyrical and showy character during that period. El-Imam presented similar experiences in films such as: My Story with Time (1973), Amira, my Love (1974), Truth has A Voice (1976), The Son of a Local Man (1979) and other films. He directed one television work, the series “His Majesty is Love”, and he directed a radio serial about the life of Badi’a Masabni. And he directed one play for the theater by Naguib El-Rihani, entitled “Oh, sweet woman, don’t play with matches.” Hassan El-Imam’s style was unique and distinguished from others of his generation, and he presented in the 1980s; Blood on A Rose Dress (1982), The Age of Love (1986) written by Naguib Mahfouz, and his last film was Tomorrow is better than Today (1986), el-Imam made three films listed in the Top 100 Egyptian films list.

== Personal life ==
El-Imam was married to Naemat Al-Hadidi, a housewife together they had two sons and a daughter, Hussein (1951–2014), music composer, arranger, singer, film producer, actor and tv presenter, Moody, writer and composer of film soundtracks and Zainab, a journalist in Al-Ahram. El-Imam died in Cairo on 29 January 1988.

== Filmography ==
Year	Title	Notes
1947	"Angels in Hell" (Mala'eka fi Gahannam)	
1947	"Women Are Ifreets" (El-Setat Afareet)	
1948	"Fame or Wealth" (El-Seet wala El-Ghena)	
1949	"The Two Orphans" (Al-Yateematain)	
1950	"Calumnied by the People" (Zalamony El-Nas)	
1950	"An Hour for Your Heart" (Saa la kalbak)	
1951	"People's Secrets" (Asrar El-Nas)	
1951	"I Am Well Born" (Ana Bent Nas)	
1951	"Rule of The Strong" (Hokm El-Kawy)	
1952	"The Cup of Suffering" (Kas El-Azab)	
1952	"The Parent's Curse" (Ghadab El-Waledeen)	
1952	"The Time of Wonders" (Zman El-Agaeb)	
1952	"Whose Daughter Am I" (Ana Bent Meen)	
1953	"By What Right" (Fi Sharie Meen)	
1953	"Love in the Shadows" (Hob fi El-Zalam)	
1953	"The Bread Vendor" (Baeet El-Khobz)	
1953	"The Scandalmonger" (Tager El-Fadaeh)	
1954	"People's Hearts" (Kolob El-Nas)	
1954	"A Wife's Confessions" (Eaterfat Zawga)	
1954	"The Unjust Angel" (Al-Malak Al-Zalem)	
1955	"Flesh" (Al-Gasad)	
1955	"Women of the Night" (Banat El-Liel)	
1956	"Farewell at Dawn" (Wadaa fi El-Fagr)	
1957	"House of Forbidden Pleasures" (Wakr El-Malzat)	
1957	"Lawahez"	
1957	"I Shall Never Cry" (Lan Abky Abdan)	
1957	"The Great Love" (Al-Hob Al-Azeem)	
1957	"Seduction" (Eghraa)	
1958	"The Young She Devil" (Al-Shaytana Al-Saghyra)	
1958	"Awatef"	
1958	"Virgin Hearts" (Kolob El-Azara)	
1960	"Love and Adoration" (Hub Hatta El-Ibada)	
1960	"Money and Women" (Mal w Nesaa)	
1960	"Men's Companion" (Saedet el regal)	
1960	"A Wife from the Street" (Zawga men El-Sharee)	
1960	"I Accuse" (Inny Attahim)	
1961	"The Student" (El-Telmyza)	
1961	"The Dumb Girl" (El-Kharsaa)	
1961	"My Life is The Price" (Hayaty Hia El-Thaman)	
1962	"The Sins" (El-Khataya)	
1962	"The Miracle" (El-Moageza)	
1963	"Shafika the Copt Girl" (Shafika El-Kebtya)	
1963	"Alley of the Pestle" (Zokak Al-Madak)	
1963	"The Newspaper Vendor" (Bayaet El-Garaed)	
1963	"A Woman on the Outside" (Emraa Ala El-Hamesh)	
1964	"A Thousand and One Nights" (Alf Leila w Liela)	
1964	"Between Two Palaces" (Been El-Asreen)	
1965	"The Nun" (Al-Raheba)	
1965	"She and the Men" (Hia w Al-Regal)	
1966	"He and the Women" (Hoa w Al-Nesaa)	
1966	"Three Thieves" (3 Losoos)	
1967	"El-Shok Palace" (Kasr El-Shok)	
1967	"The Beggars' Strike" (Edrab El-Shahteen)	
1968	"I'm not Irresponsible" (Lasto Mostahtera)	
1968	"One of the Girls" (Bint Min El-Banat)	
1969	"The Beautiful Aziza" (El-Helwa Aziza)	
1970	"Shaka Mafrosha"	
1970	"Egyptian Dalal" (Dalal Al-Masrya)	
1971	"The Forbidden Love" (Al-Hob Al-Moharam)	
1971	"Love And Money" (Al-Hob w Al-Feloos)	
1972	"Emtethal"	
1972	"Watch out for Zouzou" (Khaly Balak mn Zozo)	
1972	"Badyaa's Daughter" (Bent Bayaa)	
1972	"Love And Pride" (Hob w Kebryaa)	
1973	"Al-Sukarya"	
1973	"My Story With Time" (Hekayty Maa El-Zaman)	
1974	"Amira My Love" (Amira Hoby Ana)	
1974	"Bamba Kashar"	
1974	"Agony Over Smiling Lips" (Al-Azaab Fawk Shafah Tabtasem)	
1974	"Agayb Ya Zaman"	
1975	"And Love Ended" (W Entaha El-Hob)	
1975	"I Love This, I Want That" (Haza Ohebo w Haza Orydo)	
1975	"Don't Leave Me Alone" (La Tatrokny Wahdy)	
1975	"Badyaa Masabny"	
1976	"And Honor Your Parents" (W Bel-Waledyn Ehsanan)	
1976	"Kamar El-Zaman"	
1976	"Truth Has a Voice" (El-Karwan Loh Shafayf)	
1977	"The Oppressed Prayer" (Doaa El-Mazlomeen)	
1978	"Love Over The Volcano" (Hob Foa El-Borkan)	
1978	"The Famous Case" (Al-Kadya Al-Mashhora)	
1979	"Heaven Under Her Feet" (Al-Gana Taht Kadamyha)	
1979	"Ebn meen fel mogtamaa"	
1980	"Don't Oppress Women" (La Tazlemo El-Nesaa)	
1982	"Lial"	
1982	"Blood on A Rose Dress" (Demaa Ala Thob Wardy)	
1983	"Kaidahon Azeem"	
1985	"God's World" (Donia Allah)	
1986	"Love's Time" (Asr El-Hob)	
1986	"Tomorrow is Better Than Today" (Bokra Ahla Mn Enharda)	
