= Kafr Tasfa =

Village in Qalyubia Governorate, Egypt

Kafr Tasfa كفر تصفا
- Village
- Location in Egypt
- Coordinates: 30.5676872°N 31.3039979°E
- Country: Egypt
- Governorate: Qalyubia Governorate

Population
  - Total: 8,891 (2,001 census)
- Time zone: UTC+2 (EET)
  - Summer (DST): UTC+3 (EEST)

Kafr Tasfa (Egyptian Arabic: كفر تصفا) is a village in markaz Kafr Shukr, Qalyubiyya Governorate, Egypt.

Kafr Tasfa is the village where the historical stronghold of the El-Emam family is located in, which is the El-Emam Palace.

== Population ==
The population of Kafr Tsfa was 8,891 people, according to the official census of 2006.
