= Alaa el-Din bin el-Emam =

Egyptian Emir and general (15th century – 16th century)

Alaa el-Din Ali bin el-Emam Abu el-ostool Amir al-Hajj
- Born: 15th century Cairo, Egyptian Sultanate.
- Died: 16th century Cairo, Ottoman Egypt.
- Military career
- Allegiance: Mamluk Sultanate of Egypt
- Branch: Egyptian Army
- Rank: Emir of Hajj
- Nickname: Abu el-ostool
- Conflicts: Battle of Jeddah; Hejaz rebellion Battle of Marj Dabiq

Alaa el-Din Ali bin el-Emam (Arabic: علاء الدين علي بن الإمام;15th century – 16th century), commonly known as Alaa el-Din bin el-Emam and nicknamed Abu el-ostool (Arabic: أبو الأسطول, lit. 'Father of the fleet'), was an Egyptian emir from the Egyptian el-Emam family. He is the descendant of the Sheikh of Islam, the Egyptian judge Abu Uday el-Masry bin el-Emam. He rose through the political ladder during the era of the Egyptian Sultan al-Ashraf Qansuh al-Ghuri, until he was appointed to the highest positions in the Egyptian Sultanate. He was one of the most powerful figures in the era of the Egyptian Sultanate. He held the positions of Amir al-Hajj (prince of pilgrimage), supervisor of Special, supervisor of Endowments, Secret writer (keeper of secrets) and supervisor of the Egyptian armies.

== Early career ==
The political career of Alaa el-Din bin el-Emam began during the reign of Sultan Qansuh al-Ghuri of Egypt, when he was appointed to the position of supervisor of Special in the year 1501. Over time, emir Alaa el-Din bin el-Emam was able to gain the trust of Sultan al-Ghuri through his competence and sincerity in his work. Therefore, he was appointed as supervisor of Endowments in addition to his original position in the year 1503, and he became the supervisor of Special and supervisor of Endowments.

== Egyptian fleet ==
With the Portuguese threatening Egypt, Sultan Qansuh al-Ghuri assigned Alaa el-Din bin el-Emam with a major mission, which was the task of building an Egyptian naval arsenal that could confront the Portuguese. Indeed, Alaa el-Din gave orders to build dozens of galleon-style warships, which were the most advanced warships in the Middle Ages.

In the year 1507, emir Alaa el-Din bin el-Emam was appointed commander of the Egyptian fleet heading to the port of Jeddah to fight the Portuguese.

== Handling the Hejaz rebellion ==
In the year 1507, while Prince Alaa el-Din bin el-Emam was in Hejaz, there was a major rebellion by the Arab tribes against the Egyptian Sultanate. Prince Alaa el-Din led his forces, put down the rebellion, and beheaded the rebel leaders. In addition, he arrested the rebellious naval commander, Nour Al-Din Al-Masalati.

Building facilities

Prince Alaa el-Din bin el-Emam built many wells in the Badr area for pilgrims to drink from. In addition, he did an honorable job of rebuilding the blessed Well of Badr, where the events of the Battle of Badr, the first battle in Islam, took place. In addition, he restored the Nabataean Cave and prepared the road for pilgrims and secured it. Those actions are what will lead to his appointment to the position of Emir of Hajj in the future.

== Honors by the Sultan ==
In the capital of the Egyptian Sultanate, Cairo, Prince Alaa el-Din bin el-Emam was welcomed like a conqueror. The Sultan of Egypt Al-Ghuri welcomed him personally and with the senior princes and judges, and bestowed upon the prince royal sultanic clothes. This was in addition to another valuable gift represented by a purebred Egyptian horse and other gifts.

In the year 1508, Alaa el-Din bin el-Emam displayed the last Egyptian ships built in a great naval military parade. Most of the people of Cairo were amazed by it, and the Sultan was so impressed by the display that he gave the prince another sultanic clothes. For his efforts in building a completely new Egyptian fleet, Prince Alaa el-Din bin el-Emam became nicknamed the Father of the Fleet in the late era of the Egyptian Sultanate.

== Apparent authority ==
In the year 1509, it was very clear that Alaa el-Din bin el-Emam became one of the most powerful men of the Egyptian Sultanate and one of the closest men to the Sultan. This is clear from his objection to some of the Sultan's decisions, and his execution of punishments himself without asking permission from the Sultan, the most prominent of which was the implementation of the punishment of beating and imprisonment of Mahammad bin el-Azma, former supervisor of Endowments.

== Battle of Marj Dabiq ==
In the year 1516, he went out with the Egyptian army under the leadership of Sultan Qansuh al-Ghuri to meet the Ottomans in the Battle of Marj Dabiq, and returned with the remnants of the army after being betrayed resulting in the defeat of the army.

At the end of his life, he was appointed as the Emir of the Egyptian Hajj then he became the supervisor of armies and Secret writer.

== Emir of Hajj ==
In the Ottoman era, his last appearance was when he was in the position of Amir al-Hajj, and he played a heroic role during the return of the Egyptian Hajj caravan, which suffered from hunger and thirst due to lack of supplies. Ibn Iyas says about him textually:

"They praised the supervisor of Special for what he did to the pilgrims on the way, in terms of kindness, donations, and good deeds. If he saw one of the pilgrims exhausted, he would put them on his camel, and bless them with an evening meal and breadcrumbs on the way out and back. The pilgrims returned satisfied with what he did to them, and he was kind to them in his treatment. He walked carefully with the caravan because of the exhausted pilgrims, and they praised him well in this year.”

His contemporary historian Abdul Qadir al-Jaziri says about him textually: "Among his (Alaa el-Din) words:

“We do not know the direction of the affairs of this matter except from God Almighty.” His resolve was strengthened, and he proceeded with matters in the best condition and the most complete rule. His word was carried out and his popularity increased, and he continued to conduct this court with chastity, maintenance, and integrity. Including luck, interest, and benefit for the poor and pilgrims, he arranged this office in a good and consistent manner, and made it known and determined taxes, and rules, so it became a law to be relied upon, such that the matters of Hajj and its tasks are referred to in it, and it is relied upon in what is issued.”
