= Kafr Shukr =

Kafr Shukr كفر شكر
- Location in Egypt
- Coordinates: 30.546961°N 31.267333°E
- Country: Egypt
- Governorate: Qalyubia

Area
  - Total: 67.37 km^{2} (26.01 sq mi)
- Elevation: 12 m (39 ft)

Population (2021)
  - Total: 199,650
  - Density: 2,963/km^{2} (7,675/sq mi)
- Time zone: UTC+2 (EET)
  - Summer (DST): UTC+3 (EEST)

Kafr Shukr (Arabic: كفر شكر) is a markaz with a corresponding eponymous capital town in Qalyubia Governorate, Egypt.

== History and etymology ==
Kafr Shukr was established in the year 1228 AH, corresponding to 1830 AD, by Mr. "Shukr bin Ibrahim" from the village of Isnit (Isnit is a village that extends its history to the Pharaonic era, where it was known in the past as "Zint" and remained present with its name distorted until it was known during the reign of Muhammad Ali as Asnit).

== Economy ==
Kafr shukr is famous for growing fruits, mostly citrus, grapes, bananas, and prunes. There are also a large number of poultry fattening stations and projects that produce 15 million eggs annually. There are also some light industries such as furniture, tiles and clay bricks. Kafr Shukr is also famous for the trade in the field of meat and poultry, as its presence on the Mansoura - Damietta - Banha road has resulted in a trade in grains, fertilizers and fodder, as well as a large number of restaurants and shops serving the road and visitors to the Ras Al Bar and Gamasa summer resorts.

== Division of the Markaz ==
Markaz Kafr Shukr is subdivided into six subdivisions:

Kafr Shukr town, markaz capital

Al-Shaqr village

Isnit village

Baqashin village

Al Munsha'a Al Kubra village

Kafr Tasfa village
