= Noura Qadry =

Egyptian actress (born 1954)

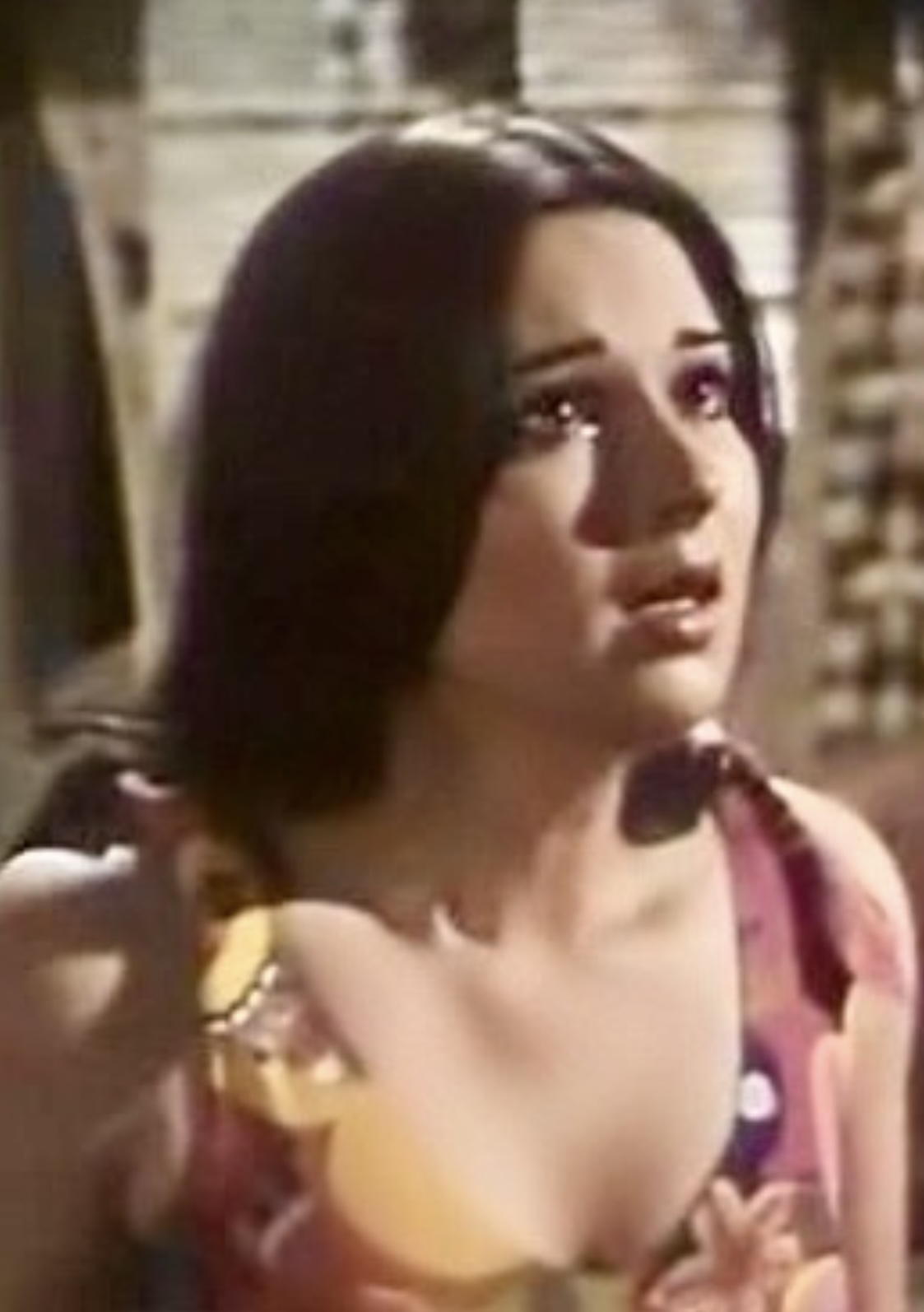
- Born: Elweya Mostafa Mohamed Adry; June 18, 1954 (age 71); Cairo, Egypt
- Occupation: Actress

Noura Mostafa Qadry (Arabic: نورا مصطفى قدري), more commonly known simply as Noura, (born on June 18, 1954, as Elweya Mostafa Mohamed Adry) is a retired Egyptian actress. She began her career in Egyptian cinema during the 1970s and continued acting until she retired in the 1990s, and wore the Hijab (Islamic Scarf), living a religious life now.

== Early life ==
Noura is born in Cairo to Egyptian parents in the middle class district of Shubra. She is the sister of the actress Poussi. Since the 1990s, she rejected any media appearance and is living a quiet life as a devout Muslim .
