= Hussein el-Imam =

Egyptian actor and television presenter (1951–2014)

- حسين الإمام
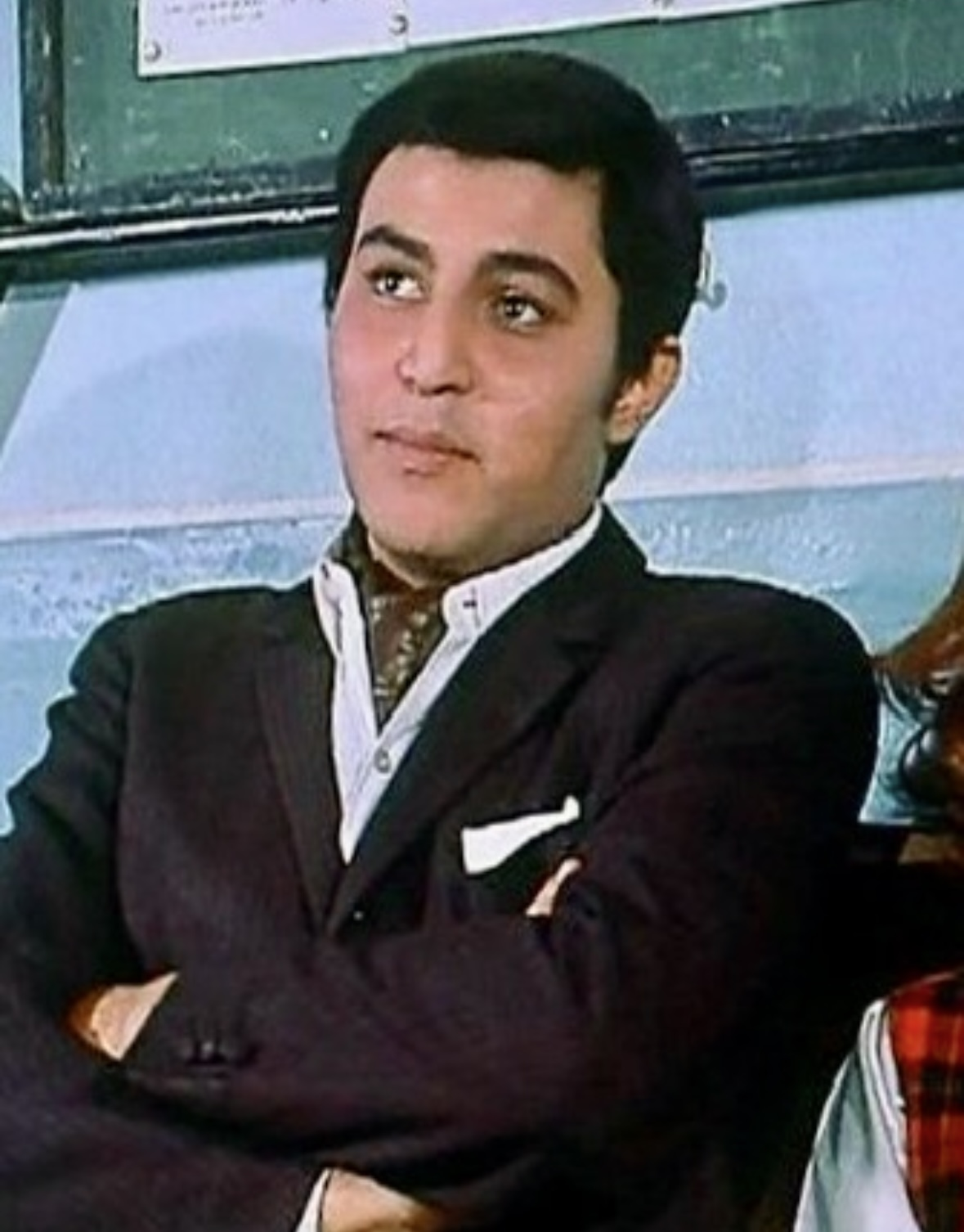
- El-Imam in 1973
- Born: Hussein Hassan El-Imam; February 8, 1951; Cairo, Kingdom of Egypt
- Died: May 17, 2014 (aged 63); Giza, Egypt
- Occupation: Musician • actor • film producer
- Years active: 1973–2014
- Spouse: Sahar Rami (m. 1987)
- Children: 2
- Father: Hassan el-Imam
- Family: El-Emam family

Hussein el-Imam (Arabic: حسين الإمام; February 8, 1951 in Egypt – May 17, 2014) also spelled Hussein El-Emam was a well-known Egyptian film musician, actor and producer.

== Career ==
El-Imam began his career playing music with his brother Moody El-Emam. This developed into an artistic partnership between the two brothers and they created Thebes band which released five albums together.

El-Imam wrote the soundtracks of many Egyptian films including Kaboria (1990) which he also produced, starring Ahmed Zaki and Ice Cream in Gleem (1992) starring Egyptian pan-Arab pop star Amr Diab, which El-Imam produced as well. He also wrote the musical score for a number of theatrical works on stage like Albanda, Lamma baba yenam and Lil kibar faqat as well as a number of Egyptian television series. He composed a number of songs particularly for Mohamed Mounir. He also established his own musical studio.

El-Imam, who acted in over 70 films he was featured in several films in notable roles, such as; El-Salakhana (1982), El Toot W El Nabboot (1986) and Hekayat El Ghareeb (1992). On television, he also appeared in several television series, although he wasn’t the main role, but he had a great influence on them, such as: Hawanem Garden City in 1998, Lel Adala Wogooh Katheera in 2001, and Ahzan Mariam in 2006. El-Imam was the host of several popular candid camera and talk / entertainment shows like Hassan ala al hawaa, Hussein ala al hawaa, Fasel w nwasel, Eh en nizam and Kalaam Hussein.

== Personal life ==
He was the son of the late Hassan el-Imam, one of Egypt's most acclaimed filmmakers from the El-Imam family. His brother Moody El-Imam is also a well known writer, composer of film soundtracks. Hussein El-Imam was married to Egyptian actress Sahar Rami. He died in 2014 reportedly of a cardiac arrest. He was 63.

== Filmography ==
=== Film ===
Acting

- 1975: Bamba Kashar
- 1979: El ganna taht qadamayha as Ahmad
- 1990: Kaboria as Sliman
- 1998: Pizza Pizza as Bibars
- 1999: Ashik wadi fi Roxy as al-Akhdar
- 2002: Kazalek fil Zamalek as Nizar

Other roles

- 1978: Hub faq al burkan
- 1979: Sultanat al tarab
- 1992: Ice Cream fi Gleem as Ziko
- 2009: Ihki ya Shahrazad (English title Scheherazade, Tell Me a Story)
- 2013: Samir abu Nil

Producer

- 1990: Kaboria
- 1992: Ice Cream in Gleem
- 1996: Estakoza

Soundtracks

- 1973: As Sukkariyah
- 1974: Bamba Kashar
- 1975: Badi'a Masabni
- 1976: El Karawan lou shafayef
- 1978: Shuqqa w arousa ya rab
- 1978: Hisab al siniin
- 1978: Bidoun gawaz afdal
- 1981: Lahzet da'af
- 1982: Al Selkhana
- 1986: Bukra ahla min naharda
- 1986: Al Ferrisa
- 1987: Al Mal'oub
- 1989: Taman al ghurba
- 1991: Samaa' hess
- 1992: Ouyoun al saqr
- 1992: Imra'a ayela lil suquut
- 1992: Ice Ceam fi Gleem
- 1994: Disco, disco
- 1995: Atabat el settat
- 1995: Samt el kherfan
- 1996: Ya dunya ya gharami
- 1996: Al Ghadiboun
- 1996: Estakuza
- 1999: Ashik wadi fi Roxy
- 2000: Al warda al hamraa
- 2000: Al namas
- 2001: Ibn ezz
- 2002: Kazalek fil Zamalek
- 2002: El-Limby

=== Television ===
TV series

- Lil adalah wougouh kathira
- Saeed baa'es ta'ees as Saeed Farhat
- Ahzan Maryam as Aboul Alaa
- Al shaytan la ya'ref el hob
- Yak Hanna al jiran (Moroccan series)
- Adam wa gamila

TV shows

- Hassan ala al hawaa
- Hussein ala al hawaa
- Fasel w nwasel
- Eh en nizam
- Kalaam Hussein

=== Theatre Music composition ===
- Ballo
- Alabanda
- Lamma baba yenam
- Lil kibar faqat
