= Mahmoud Kassem =

Egyptian writer, translator, and film critic

Mohamoud Kassem
- Born: 9 July 1949 (age 76); Alexandria, Egypt
- Education: BA in agriculture
- Alma mater: University of Alexandria
- Occupation(s): Writer, translator, critic, professor

Mahmoud Kassem (Arabic:محمود القاسم) (9 July 1949) was an Alexandria-born writer, translator, film critic, and professor. He is best known for his literary verses of children's books, novels, essays, and literary and artistic encyclopaedias. He has received numerous Egyptian and Arabic awards in children's writing and radio drama, most recently the Best Literary Study Award entitled "Arabic Literature Written in French."

== Personal life ==
Kassem was born to an average family, and his father worked for the Community Spinning Company until his death in 1956, after which his mother lived in harsh conditions as she raised Kassem and his brothers.

== Education ==
Kassem received his bachelor's degree in agriculture from the University of Alexandria in 1972.

== Biography ==
Kassem held several positions away from the field of literature, working in the Information Department of the UNESCO National Division from 1975 until 1977, then at the Institute of Commercial Art of the Technological College of Alexandria as Head of the Library Department from 1977 until 1984, and at the Egypt Foreign Trade Company of Alexandria from 1984 until 1985.

He served as editor-in-chief of Crescent Novels published by Crescent House in 1985, editor-in-chief of children's books in the same publishing house in 1999 and 2011, after which he completed writing. He used his scientific studies to present stories about science in a simplified manner, and to gather knowledge to create encyclopedias for the development of peoples. He published about ten novels in the past, 20 books on Egyptian cinema, and more than 10,000 articles in Arabic newspapers and magazines. he began writing articles in 1980 for the Evening Journal, and then for the Kuwaiti Arabic Magazine. Despite the publication of 25 encyclopedias, Al-kassem refused to be named by anyone as the writer of the encyclopedia because he had done nothing but plant the first seed: gather information, give responsibility to cultural institutions to take over the rest of the process, and avoid discussing his work at seminars and cultural gatherings. In addition, kassem translated 12 works into French, including four issues by the Egyptian-French writer, Albert Qasiri. He also produced television and radio series for adults and young people, including "Adventures of Gilgel and Pepper," which were shown on Egyptian and Arabic radio channels. The author of the film "Terrorism and the Kebab," "A Deposed Lawyer," and "Tell Yashahr Zad," was critical of the work of the senior Senarist, Wahid Hamid, and even admired for writing about the relationship of the weak citizen with powerful authorities and his use of rebellion and protest to combat his current situation.

== Novels ==
- "Why," 1982.
- "Wealth," Higher Council of Culture, Cairo, 1983. This novel was influenced by the novel "The Tatar Desert" by the Italian writer, Dino Buzzetti.
- "Alternative," Egyptian Book General, Cairo, 1987.
- "Charleston Days," Egyptian Book General, Cairo, 1998.
- "Facts of the Young Years," Arab Press Agency, Giza, 2017.
- "The Time of Abdel Halim Hafez," Arab Press Agency, Giza, 1997.
- "Life Is Single Feminine," Centre for Arab Civilization, Cairo, 2003.
- "Acts of Love," Arab Proliferation Foundation, Beirut, 2003.
- "Running Above Water," Dar Wada, Cairo, 2012. The author was inspired by the reality of this novel, which makes the reader empathize with its stories. The novel recounts the lives of eight famous people in their fields and enlists others to write on their behalf. These include the editor-in-chief of a major newspaper, a children's story anchor, a storyteller, a film screenwriter, a television writer, an Arabic language teacher, a politician and an office for preparing science letters for graduate students. From the realism of the stories, the reader will feel that these characters and those who write them live in our world. The novel contains many experiences that are recounted in an unfamiliar new version. This novel was released eight years after the release of "Acts of Love," and printed more than once.
- "The Last Days of Alexandria," Egyptian Writers General, Cairo, 2001.
- "The Hides of the Bermuda Triangle," Sunrise Publishing and Distribution House, Cairo, 1996.
- "Film and Literature in Egypt," Egyptian Book General, Cairo, 1999.
- "Najib Mahfouz Between Film and Novel," General Authority for Culture Palaces, Cairo, 2011.
- "Taha Hussain: Traveller of Will, "Knowledge House, Cairo, 1995.
- "The Kidnapping of Michael Jackson," Sunrise Publishing and Distribution House, Cairo, 1995.
- "Egyptian Cinema and Thrillers," Cultural Publishing House, Cairo, 1998.
- Atlantis, Egypt Renaissance, Giza, 1989.

== Encyclopaedias ==
- "Encyclopaedia of Songs in Egyptian Cinema," first part, 1933–1945.
- "Encyclopaedia of Songs in Egyptian Cinema: Second Part 1946 to 1949," General Authority for Culture Palaces, Cairo, 2014.
- "Encyclopaedia of Songs in Egyptian Cinema, Third Part From the Beginning to the End of 1952," General Authority for Culture Palaces, Cairo, 2014.
- "Encyclopaedia of Songs in Egyptian Cinema, Fourth Part 1953-1956," General Authority for Culture Palaces, Cairo, 2014.
- "Encyclopaedia of Songs in Egyptian Cinema: Fifth Part 1946 to 1949," General Authority for Culture Palaces, Cairo, 2014.
- "Encyclopaedia of Songs in Egyptian Cinema, Sixth Part of 1970 to 2004," General Authority for Culture Palaces, Cairo, 2014.
- "Encyclopaedia of Songs in Egyptian Cinema, Fifth Part 2005 to 2013," General Authority for Culture Palaces, Cairo, 2014.
- "Encyclopaedia of Literature at the End of the 20th Century," Egyptian-Lebanese House, Cairo, 2009.#

== Cinematic studies ==
- "Quote in Egyptian cinema: With Bibliografia in Quoted Films, "Egyptian Book General, Cairo, 2002. In this book, the writer includes quotes from films from universal films and novels, without mentioning the source. In an interview with Al Malah, Al kassem explains that the history of quotations stretches from 1933 to 2020, and aims to uncover poor cinematography in Egyptian cinema and film thefts hidden by producers.
- "Noble Slave Cinema." This book deals with Noble Obaid's cinematic work during 50 years away from her personal life, highlighting her period in early 1960 until 1990. Al-kassem told the Constitution Gazette that he had worked on this book for about two years, but that the publication and distribution of the book had been disrupted by the death of one of the authors who was going to take over the job.

== Plays ==
- "Zizo gifted his time," 1997 (first edition), 2007 (second edition).
- "Zizo Digital," 2002.

== Translations ==
- "Love Lasts Three Years" by Frederick Bigidet, folded for culture, publishing and media, Lebanon, 2015.
- "Assassination," by Emily Notomb, Crescent House, Cairo, 2003.
- "The Elegance of the Hedgehog," by Muriel Barbawah, Arab Press Agency, Giza, 2019.

== Awards ==
- Nominated for the Best Literary Study Award under the title "Arabic Literature Written in French," Writers' Union.
