= Faten Hamama filmography =

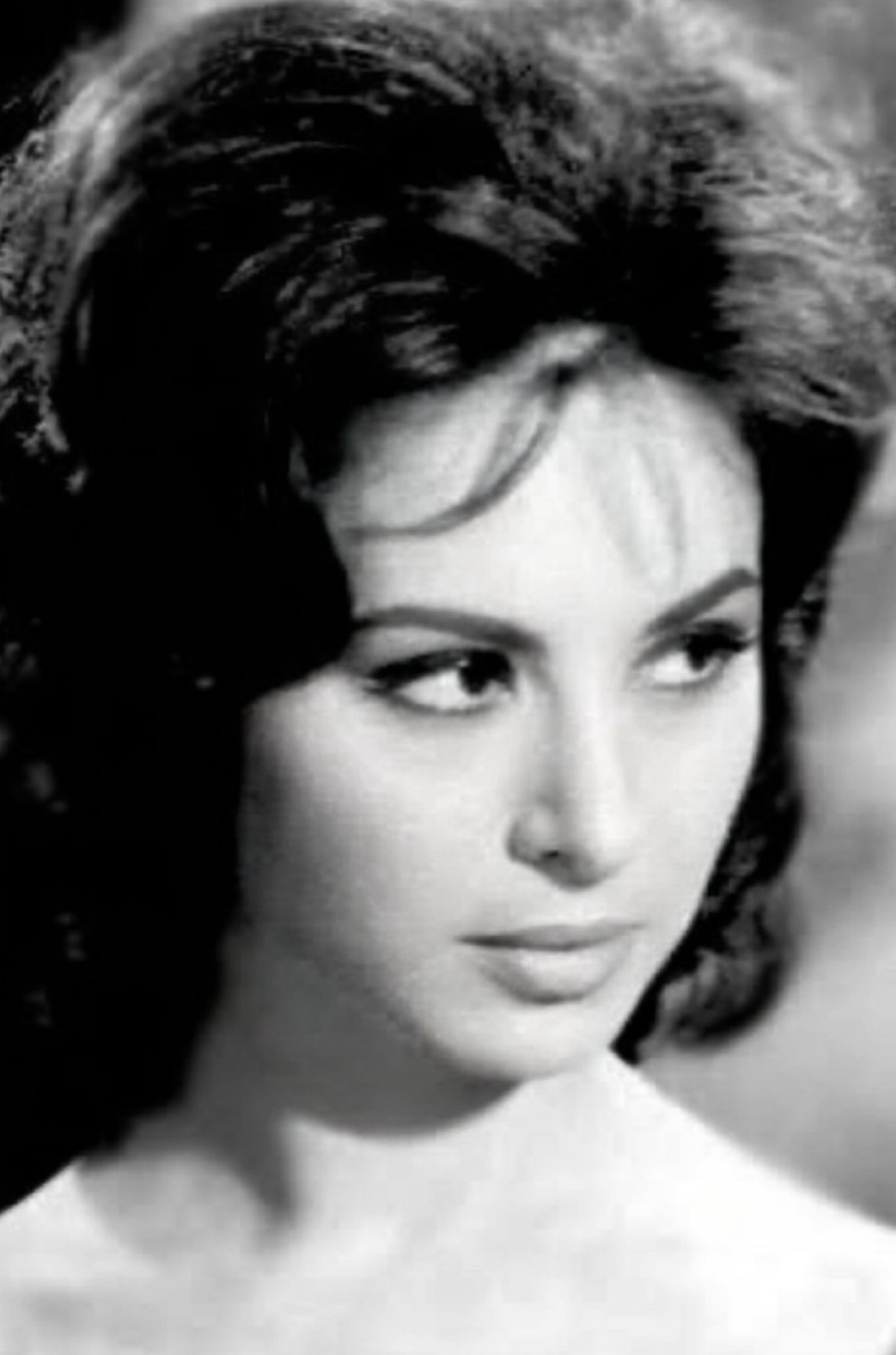
- Hamama in 1962
- Film: 91
- Television series: 2
- Radio show: 8
- Theatre: 1
- Others: 3 short films

Faten Hamama (27 May 1931 – 17 January 2015) was an Egyptian film and television actress and film producer. She was the first wife of film director Ezz El-Dine Zulficar.

This is the complete filmography of Faten Hamama, an Egyptian actress:

== Feature films ==
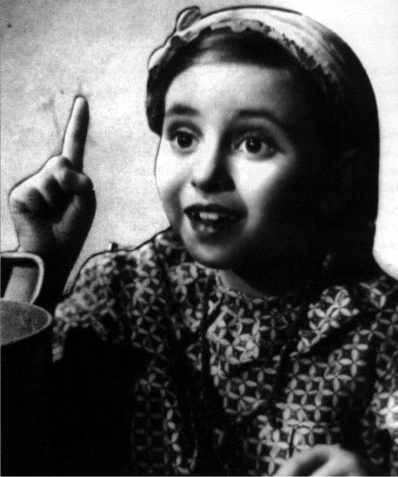
Hamama in Happy Day (1940)

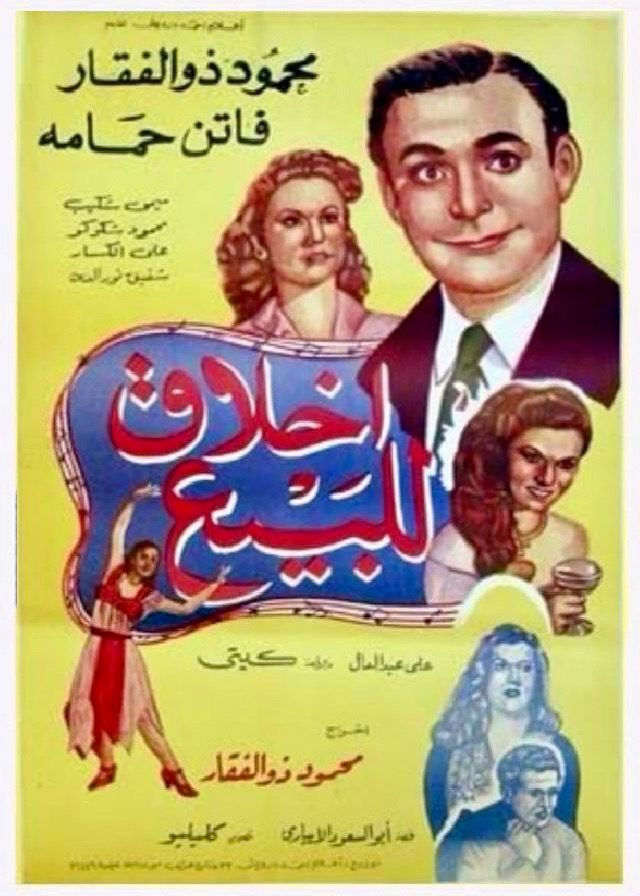
Hamama with Mahmoud Zulfikar on the poster for Virtue for Sale (1950)

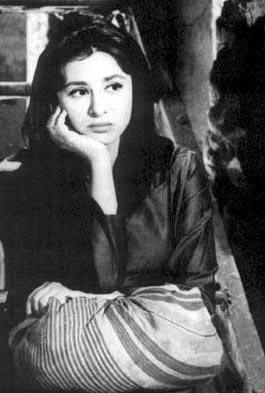
Hamama in The Sin (1965)

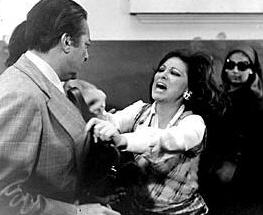
Hamama with Rushdy Abaza in I Want a Solution (1975)

Year	Title	Arabic Title	Role	Notes
1939	Happy Day	Yawm Said, يوم سعيد	Aneesa	
1944	A Bullet in the Heart	Rasasah Fi al-Qalb , رصاصة في القلب	Najwah	
1945	The First Month	Awwal al-Shahr, أول الشهر		
1946	Universe	Dunia, دنيا		
1946	Mercy Possessors	Mullak al-Rahma, مُلاك الرحمة	Thoraya	
1946	The White Angel	Al-Malak al-Abyadh, الملاك الأبيض		
1946	The Lady	Al-Hanem, الهانم		
1946	The Red Mask	Al-Qina'a al-Ahmar, القناع الأحمر		
1947	Light from the Sky	Noor Min al-Sama, نور من السماء		
1947	Angels in Hell	Mala'ekah Fi Gahannam, ملائكة في جهنم		
1947	Kanz el saada			
1947	Abuzeid al-Hilali	Abuzeid al-Hilali, أبو زيد الهلالي		
1948	The Two Orphans	Al-Yateematain, اليتيمتين		
1948	Immortality	Kholood, خلود	Laila / Amal	
1948	She Was an Angel	Kanat Malakan, كانت ملاكاً		
1948	A Complicated Life	Hayat Hai'ra, حياة حائرة		
1948	The Small Millionaire	Al-Millionairah al-Sagheerah, المليونيرة الصغيرة		
1948	The Punishment	Al 'Iqab, العقاب		
1949	Lady of the House	Sitt al-Bayt, ست البيت	Elham	
1949	Towards Victory	Nahwa al-Majd, نحو المجد	Suhair	
1949	Chair of Confession	Kursi al-I'tiraf, كرسي الاعتراف	Phileberta	
1949	Every House Has a Man	Kul Bayt Luh Rajel, كلّ بيت له راجل	Faten	
1949	El yatimatain			
1949	The Missing Link	Al-Halaqa al-Mafqouda, الحلقة المفقودة		
1950	I'm The Past	Ana al-Madi, أنا الماضي		
1950	Virtue for Sale	Akhlaq lil baye, أخلاق للبيع		
1950	People Calumnied Me	Zalamooni al-Nas, ظلموني الناس		
1950	Mr. Bayyoumi	Bayyoumi Afandi, بيّومي أفندي		
1950	Father Ameen	Baba Ameen, بابا أمين	Huda	
1951	Farewell My Love	Wada'an Ya Ghrami, وداعاً يا غرام		
1951	The True-born Son	Ibn al-Halal, ابن الحلال		
1951	I Am Well Born	Ana Bint Nas, أنا بنت ناس		
1952	Miss Fatimah	Al-Ustazah Fatimah, الأستاذة فاطمة	Fatma (Lawyer)	
1952	Immortal Song	Lahn al-Kholood, لحن الخلود	Wafa'	
1952	The Time of Miracles	Zaman al-Ajaib, زمن العجائب		
1952	By The Sweat of My Brow	Min A'raq Jbeeni, من عرق جبيني	Fatimah	
1952	Your Day Will Come	Lak Yawm Ya Zalem, لك يوم يا ظالم	Ne'mat	
1952	Salwah, My Heart	Salwah Qalbi, سلوا قلبي		
1952	Son of the Nile	Ibn al-Nile, ابن النيل	Zebaida	
1952	Charming Flowers	Al-Zhoor al-Fatinah, الزهور الفاتنة		
1952	House Number 13	Al-Manzel Raqam 13, المنزل رقم 13		
1952	The Cup of Suffering	Ka's al-Azab, كأس العذاب		
1952	People's Secrets	Asrar al-Nas, أسرار الناس		
1952	To Whom Do I Complain	Ashki Lmeen, أشكي لمين		
1952	Orphans' Money	Amwal al-Yatamah, أموال اليتامة		
1952	The Big Clown	Al-Muharrej al-Kabeer, المهرج الكبير		
1953	Daughter of Love	Bint al-Hawa, بنت الهوى		
1953	Love in Darkness	Hob Fi al-Zalam, حُب في الظلام		
1953	A'isha	A'isha, عائشة	A'isha	
1954	Struggle in the Valley	Sira' Fi al-Wadi, صراع في الوادي	Amal	
1954	Appointment with Happiness	Maw'ed Ma' al-Sa'adah, موعد مع السعادة	Ehsan / Amal	
1954	Appointment with Life	Maw'ed Ma' al-Hayat, موعد مع الحياة	Amal	
1954	The Hearts of People	Qoloob al-Nas, قلوب الناس		
1954	Pity My Tears	Irham Dmoo'i, ارحم دموعي		
1954	The Unjust Angel	Al-Malak al-Zalem, الملاك الظالم	Nadia	
1954	Always with You	Dayman Ma'ak, دائما معاك	Tefeeda	
1954	After the Farewells	Ba'd al-Wada', بعد الوداع	Amina	
1954	Traces in the Sand	Athar Fi al-Rimal, أثار في الرمال	Ragia	
1954	Slaves of Money	Abeed al-Mal, عبيد المال		
1955	God Is With Us	Allah Ma'ana, الله معانا	An actress	
1955	Love and Tears	Hob Wa Domoo', حب و دموع	Fatimah	
1955	Our Beautiful Days	Ayyamna al-Holwa, أيامنا الحلوة	Hoda	
1956	Love Date	Maw'ed Gharam, موعد غرام	Nawal	
1956	Struggle in the Pier	Sira' Fi al-Mina, صراع في الميناء	Hameedah	
1956	Bint al hawa			
1956	The Heart Has Its Reasons	Al-Qalb Lahu Ahkam, القلب له أحكام	Kareemah	
1957	I Never Sleep	La Anam, لا أنام	Nadia Lotfy	
1957	I Will Never Cry	Lan Abki Abdan, لن أبكي أبداً		
1957	Land of Peace	Ardh al-Salam, أرض السلام	Salma	
1958	The Barred Road	Al-Tareeq al-Masdood, الطريق المسدود	Fayza	
1958	Lady of the Castle	Sayyidat al-Qasr, سيدة القصر	Sawsan	
1958	Road of Hope	Tareeq al-Amal, طريق الأمل		
1958	Till We Meet	Hatta Naltaqi, حتّى نلتقي		
1958	The Virgin Wife	Al-Zawjah al-Azra'a, الزوجة العذراء	Mona	
1959	The Nightingale's Prayer	Dua'a al-Karawan, دعاء الكروان	Amnah	
1959	Among the Ruins	Bain al-Atlal, بين الأطلال	Mona	
1961	Don't Set the Sun Off	La Tutf'e al-Shams, لا تطفئ الشمس	Layla	
1961	River of Love	Nahr al-Hob, نهر الحب	Nawal	
1962	The Miracle	Al-Mu'jiza, المعجزة	Layla	
1962	I Will Not Confess	Lan A'tref, لن أعترف	Amal	
1963	Cairo		Amina	
1963	No Time For Love	La Waqt Lil Hob, لا وقت للحُب	Fawziyah	
1963	The Open Door	Al-Bab al-Maftooh, الباب المفتوح	Laila	
1963	The Heart Has its Reasons	Al-Qalb Lahu Ahkam, القلب له أحكام	Nadyah Burhan Sadeq	
1963	The Last Night	Al-Laylah al-Akheera, الليلة الأخيرة	Nadia / Fawziyah	
1965	The Sin	Al-Haram, الحرام	Azizah	
1965	Story of a Lifetime	Hikayat al-'Omr Kolloh, حكاية العمر كلّه	Nadia	
1965	The Confession	Al-'Itriaf, الاعتراف	Nawal	
1965	The Outcasts' Curse	La'net al-Manboozeen, لعنة المنبوذين		
1966	Something in My Life	Shai' Fi Hayati, شيء في حياتي	A'ida	
1969	The Great Love	Al-Hob al-Kbeer, الحب الكبير	Hanan	
1971	Golden Sands	Rimal Min Zahab, رمال من ذهب	zubaida	
1971	Witch	Sahira, ساحرة	Soad	Short
1971	Thin Thread	Al-Khayt al-Rfee, الخيط الرفيع	Mona	
1972	Empire M	Imbratoriyat Meem, امبراطورية ميم	Mona	
1973	I Want This Man	Oreedo Hatha al-Rajol, أريدُ هذا الرجلاً	naila	Short
1973	The Song of Death	Oghniat al-Mawt, أغنية الموت	Asaker	Short
1974	My Love	Habibati, حبيبتي	Samia Mahmoud	
1975	I Want a Solution	Oreedo Hallan, أريدُ حلاً	Fawzya	
1977	Mouths and Rabbits	Afwah wa Araneb, أفواه و أرانب	Ne'mat	
1979	Ladies Should Not Offer Condolences	Wa La 'Aza'a Lil Sayyidat, ولا عزاء للسيدات	Rawya	
1984	The Night of Fatima's Arrest	Laylat al-Qabdh 'Ala Fatima, ليلة القبض على فاطمة	Fatima	
1988	Sweet Days.. Bitter Days	Yawm Mor.. Yawm Holoo, يوم مر.. يوم حلو	Aisha	
1993	Land of Dreams	Ardh al-Ahlam, أرض الأحلام	Nargis	

== Television ==
Year	Title	Arabic	Role
1991	Miss Hikmat's Conscience (mini-series)	Dameer Ablah Hikmat, ضمير أبلة حكمت	Hikmat
2000	Face of the Moon (mini-series)	Wajh al-Qamar, وجه القمر	Ibtisam al-Bostany

== Production ==
Year	Title	Arabic	Notes
1954	Appointment with Life	Maw'ed Ma' al-Hayat, موعد مع الحياة	Co-production with Ezz El-Dine Zulficar
1955	Appointment with Happiness	Maw'ed Maa al-Sa'ada, موعد مع السعادة	Co-production with Ezz El-Dine Zulficar
1956	Love and Tears	Hub wa Doumo', حُب و دموع	Producer
1973	The Song of Death (TV)	Oghniat al-Mowt, أُغنية الموت	Co-production with Salah Zulfikar Films and Egyptian Television
1979	Story Behind Every Door (TV)	Hikaya Wara Kol Bab, حكاية وراء كل باب	Co-production with Egyptian Television

== See also ==
- Lists of Egyptian films
