= List of Egyptian films of 1949 =

A list of films produced in Egypt in 1949. For an A-Z list of films currently on Wikipedia, see Category:Egyptian films.

Title	Director	Cast	Genre	Notes
Afrita Hanem (The Genie Lady)	Henry Barakat	Farid al-Atrash, Samia Gamal, Ismail Yasseen	Comedy	
Nahwa al-Majd (Towards Glory)	Hussein Sedki	Faten Hamama, Kamal Al-Shennawi	Romance	
Ghazal Al Banat (The Flirtation of Girls)	Anwar Wagdi	Naguib El Rihani, Leila Mourad, Anwar Wagdi	Comedy / Romance	
Kul Bayt Lahu Rajel (Every House Has Its Man)	Ahmed Kamel Morsi	Faten Hamama, Mahmoud el-Meliguy, Amina Rizk	Drama	
Sitt al-Bayt (Lady of the House)	Ahmed Kamel Morsi	Faten Hamama, Imad Hamdi	Drama	
Kursi al-I`tiraf (Chair of Confession)	Youssef Wahbi	Faten Hamama, Youssef Wahbi	Drama / Crime	
Al-Yateematain (The Two Orphans)	Hassan Al Imam	Faten Hamama	Drama / Crime	
