= List of Egyptian films of 1954 =

A list of films produced in Egypt in 1954. For an A-Z list of films currently on Wikipedia, see Category:Egyptian films.

Title	Director	Cast	Genre	Notes
Irham Dmoo`i (Pity My Tears)	Henry Barakat	Shukry Sarhan, Faten Hamama, Rushdy Abaza	Drama	
Athar Fi al-Rimal (Traces in the Sand)	Gamal Madkoor	Emad Hamdy, Faten Hamama	Drama	
Banat Hawa (Eve's Daughters)		Mohamed Fawzi, Madiha Youssry	Comedy	
Dayman Ma`ak (Always With You)	Henry Barakat	Muhammad Fawzi, Salah Nazmi, Faten Hamama	Comedy / romance	
Al-Malak al-Zalem (The Unjust Angel)	Hassan Al Imam	Faten Hamama, Kamal Al-Shennawi, Hind Rostom	Drama	
Maw`ed Ma` al-Sa`adah (Appointment with Happiness)	Ezzel Dine Zulficar	Faten Hamama, Imad Hamdi	Drama / romance	
Sira` Fi al-Wadi (Struggle in the Valley)	Youssef Chahine	Faten Hamama, Omar Sharif, Farid Shawki	Drama / romance	Entered into the 1954 Cannes Film Festival
El Wahsh (The Monster)	Salah Abu Seif	Anwar Wagdi, Mahmoud El-Meliguy, Samia Gamal, Abbas Fares	Crime	Entered into the 1954 Cannes Film Festival
El Zolm Haram (Injustice Is Forbidden)	Hasan El-Saifi	Shadia, Farid Shawqi, Magda al-Sabahi, Emad Hamdy, Katie (Egyptian actress) (or Kitty, Keti), and Dalida	Drama	
