= Chair of Confession =

Kursi al-I`tiraf
- Kursi al-I`tiraf poster
- Directed by: Youssef Wahbi
- Written by: Youssef Wahbi
- Produced by: Gabriel Nahas; Ramses Naguib
- Starring: Faten Hamama; Fakher Fakher; Abdel Alim Khattab; Youssef Wahbi
- Cinematography: Mahmoud Nasr
- Release date: 1949
- Country: Egypt
- Language: Arabic

Kursi al-I`tiraf (Arabic: كرسي الإعتراف, Chair of Confession or Confession Chair) is a 1949 Egyptian crime/drama film starring Faten Hamama and Youssef Wahbi, who also directed the movie and wrote its script. Youssef Wahbi, who had played the role of Cardinal Giovanni, received a golden medal from the Vatican.

== Plot ==
The film portrays the various lives of members of the Catholic Medici family, which is headed by Cardinal Giovanni. The Cardinal's brother, Guliano, has fallen in love with a young and beautiful lady, Phileberta. Another man, Andrea, a handsome and successful army leader, is also in love with her. He competes with Guliano for her heart.

Andrea plots for a dangerous conspiracy; he kills Phileberta's father and hides his crime. Guliano is blamed for the murder and is then executed and put to death. Months later, Andrea confesses to the cardinal of his malignant crime. Cardinal Giovanni is devastated from the truth of his brother's death.

== Cast ==
- Youssef Wahbi as Cardinal Giovanni.
- Abdel Alim Khattab as Andrea Strotsy.
- Faten Hamama as Phileberta.
- Fakher Fakher as Guliano.
- Negma Ibrahim as Mother of Diovanni.
- Seraj Munir as Governor of Rome.
