= Gazbia Sirry =

Egyptian painter (1925–2021)

Gazbia Sirry OSA
- Born: Gazbia Sirry; October 11, 1925; Zamalek, Cairo, Egypt
- Died: November 10, 2021 (aged 96); Cairo, Egypt
- Education: Higher Institute of Art Education for Women Teachers; Faculty of Arts Education at Capital University
- Known for: Painting
- Style: Abstract Expressionism
- Awards: Order of Sciences and Arts

Gazbia Sirry (Egyptian Arabic: جاذبيه سرى) (11 October 1925 – 10 November 2021) was an Egyptian painter.

Born in Cairo, Gazbia Sirry studied fine arts at the Higher Institute of Art Education for Women Teachers in 1950 (currently known as the Faculty of Art Education at Helwan University), where her dissertation traced Egypt's political history. She later became a professor there, and also at the American University in Cairo. She has had more than 50 personal exhibitions, official purchases by international museums, international prizes, scholarships and university chairs. The paintings of Sirry capture the relationship between social reform, feminist consciousness and advocacy of women. Because of their eclecticism and heterogeneity of modern Egypt, Sirry's paintings were widely celebrated.

Her early work was dominated by images of women in unmistakable poses of power, performing roles in the public and private spheres, and celebrating female unity. In the late nineteen fifties, Sirry made stylistic and thematic changes to reflect the grim mood created by discontent with the crackdown on dissent and curtailment of political freedom across the country. It also became increasingly abstract: by the 1960s this shift was apparent. While on fellowship at the Huntington Hartford Foundation in Pacific Palisades, California, 1965, she was introduced to the American style of abstract expressionism; in interviews Sirry credited this time in her life with "profound impact upon her art practice." Her shift towards abstraction has also been linked some scholars to political unrest and especially the Six-Day War of1967. The full abstraction was replaced in the early 1970s by the reappearance of human forms, but the dark paintings represent the fears of Sirry about the fortunes of women's emancipation. The dominant bright colors and pyramidal shapes of her paintings show the national pride and enthusiasm following the Ramadan/Yom Kippur War of 1973 in the later part of the 1970s.

== Early life ==
Sirry was born to an aristocratic Turkish family in 1925, and was raised with her two sisters, by both her mother and her grandmother in an elegant villa in the Helmeya neighborhood, where most of the surrounding community lived more modestly. She lost her father, Hassan Sirry Nammy, when she was four years old and her mother, Esmat El-Daly, was the one to take control of her education. Her uncles on her father's side were the ones who contributed to her introduction to art by taking her to the theater and giving her the opportunity to become familiar with the expansive library.

== Education ==
Raised by two women, Sirry's maternal caregivers were tasked to bring up Sirry alone. Her mother was left a widow after Sirrys' father's death and with that, Sirry's female leadership figures took charge of her education and played a prominent role in the empowering feminist artwork that she would create later in life. Sirry witnessed the struggle that her caretakers endured during her upbringing in Cairo. Although her mother and grandmother had no attachment directly to a man, her uncles (on her paternal side) inspired her connection to art, theater, culture, and art history.

Sirry's first known educational milestone was motivated by her mother, who suggested Sirry attend the Higher Institute for Young Women in Cairo. After 5 years, in 1948, Sirry gained a diploma in Fine Arts which only enhanced her love for art making. She received government scholarships that allowed her to travel abroad. Her next journey was to Paris, France where she would learn from Marcel Gromaire - a famous painter and teacher whom she learned much from during her initial graduate studies. By 1952, she was furthering her studies at the Egyptian Academy in Rome and tunneled her efforts into Art Education. Finally, she attended Slade College in London, England from 1954 - 1955, where she studied painting and lithography.

Sirry returned to Cairo where she taught for about twenty years. Her education gave her insight into not only the art world, but the political and social issues she would later comment on in her art.

== Career ==
Gazbia Sirry's career as an artist can be loosely arranged into three distinct time periods.

At the beginning of her career, Sirry joined the Modern Art Group ('Game'iat al-Fann al-Hadith'). The artists involved were supporters of the Nasserist revolution, and were eager to contribute to the creation of a genuine Egyptian art. Rather than completely dismissing Western artistic techniques, they blended them with traditional local imagery. Sirry's early paintings of the 1930s and 1940s are characterized by depictions of powerful female figures of all social and economic classes. This contrasts with the popular depiction of female peasants in Egypt in 1920s and 1930s painting, sculpture and visual culture. In these works, she emphasizes the role of diverse, powerful women in Egypt as well as their importance in defining a new Egyptian Republic. She was interested in people's lives, representing marginalized groups. Sirry's paintings reflected traditions and culture, focusing on people and houses in Cairo. During this era of her artistic practice, Sirry utilized strong black contours to highlight figures on a flat plane, similar to that of Pharaonic art and Coptic icons. This was a quality that defined her early paintings, along with her vibrant color scheme, which was a trend in her work until her death.

In the early 1950s, Sirry refused to join her family when they moved to the upscale neighborhood of Manial al-Roda. Instead, she rented a room in Helmeya to stay connected with the lifestyle of the average working class in Egypt. Here, Sirry's neighbours became models for her paintings such as Oum Ratiba (1952), Oum Antar (1953), and Both Wives (1953). These artworks were displayed at Sirry's first exhibition at the Museum of Egyptian Modern Art in Cairo in 1953. Into the later 1950s and 1960s, Sirry began creating less figural and more abstract and expressionist paintings, due to a growing interest in non-representational forms as well as the inherent qualities of color and line. Instead of filling her paintings with many shapes, she started creating calm and peaceful scenes that were less tied to the city and more focused on the vast dessert surrounding Cairo. She painted wide desert landscapes and used the shape of a pyramid (a triangle) to organize her paintings in a very structured way. This transition has been largely attributed to her growing disillusionment with the Egyptian Government under the Nasser presidency after Sirry and her husband were imprisoned on allegations of Communist activity in 1959. In this second era of Sirry's practice, she continued to work with bold color; however her use of line softened and separated, representative of the personal and cultural conflicts within Sirry and Egypt at the time.

Six years after her imprisonment, in 1965, Sirry earned a fellowship to join the Huntington Hartford Foundation in Pacific Palisades, California, an artists' colony in the Santa Monica Mountains. There, she was introduced to the American style of Abstract Expressionism, which influenced the third developmental stage of her practice. The defeat of Egypt and its Arab allies by Israel in the Six-Day War, in 1967, is also considered a key factor in the transformations of Sirry's work. By this time, the artist was no longer including figural representations in her work, instead focusing on furthering her discovery of abstract line and color. From the 1970's until her death she fixated on expressionist "city scapes". These exercises in color and line evoke complex city grids. In 1993, Sirry held a residency at the National Museum of Women in the Arts in Washington, DC. Soon after, an exhibition opened highlighting Arab women artists called Forces of Change that included three of her paintings.

Sirry's entire career of work has been described as a "complex political project" as her pieces reflect and respond to her experiences living under the political unrest of Egypt. In 2014, Shems Friedlander, professor of practice in the Department of Journalism and Mass Communication and director of The Photographic Gallery, described Sirry as "a senior Egyptian artist who is recognised on an international level. Her value to both the University and Egypt is both as an artist and a historian of Egypt's culture for over 60 years. She has both joined and led the trends in Egyptian art for several decades." In 2016, Sirry held her last exhibition titled 'Art Is My Life' which reflected on her 68 year long career, showcasing works from the 1940s to 2010. Sirry's paintings permanently reside at the Museum of Modern Egyptian Art in Cairo, the Alexandria Modern Art Museum, the Marine Museum in Alexandria, along with other establishments. She has been known to donate large amounts of her works to museums, national landmarks and public institutions around Egypt because of her belief that artists have an obligation to raise awareness of the contexts they are interpreting.

== Artistic impact ==
Sirry and her art have majorly contributed to discourse pertaining to nationalism, cultural emancipation, gender politics, and individual freedoms within a sovereign state. She is the longest living female artist belonging belongs to a generation of artists of artists that came to prominence in the years before Nasser's Revolution.

== International recognition ==
Sirry received several prestigious awards and prizes, including the following:

- Prize of Rome,1952
- Honorary Prize, Venezia Biennale,1956
- Honorary Prize for Creative Painting, Cairo,1957
- Second Prize (lithography) Alexandria Biennale, 1959
- First Prize (painting) Alexandria Biennale, 1963
- First Prize, Salon du Caire, 1960
- Fourth great Prize of International Contemporary Art, Monaco, 1968
- State Prize and Order of Sciences and Arts of First Degree, 1970
- Prize of Cairo Opera for Quadruple Tapestry Design, 1990
- State Merit Prize, 2000

== Collections ==
Sirry's work has been collected by the following institutions:

- Egypt Modern Art Museum, Cairo
- Alexandria Modern Art Museum
- Marine Museum in Alexandria
- The Egyptian National Bank in Cairo
- Al-Ahram newspaper, Cairo
- The Ministry of Foreigners and Egyptian embassies abroad
- The Egyptian Art Academy in Rome
- Arts and Sciences Museum in Evansville, Indiana, USA
- Vincent Price Art Collection in Los Angeles, USA
- Faculties of fine arts and art education in Cairo, Alexandria and Menia
- Josef Museum of Unaligned Countries in Belgrade, Yugoslavia
- Living Art Museum in Tunis
- The Grand Conference Hall at Cairo Opera House and Cairo
- The National Museum of Women Arts in Washington
- Arab World Institute in Paris
- Museum of Art and Sciences in Evansville, Indiana, USA
- Unaligned Countries Museum in Yugoslavia
- The American University in Cairo
- Cairo Opera House
- Great Cairo Library
- Mubarak Public Library in Giza
- The Supreme Council of Culture, Cairo
- Press Syndicate, Cairo
- Novotel Hotel in Cairo Airport
- Sheraton Hotel in Giza
- Sheraton Atoun Hotel in Nuba

== Bibliography ==
- Atallah, Nadine. "Have there really been no great women artists ? Writing a feminist art history of modern Egypt", in Under the skin : feminist art and art histories from the Middle East and North Africa today, Oxford : Oxford University Press, 2020 (Proceedings of the British Academy), p. 11‑25.
- Atallah, Nadine. "Gazbia Sirry", Dalloul Art Foundation, https://dafbeirut.org/en/gazbia-sirry
- Atallah, Nadine. "Women, Art and the Nation. History of the Exhibitions of Two Egyptian Women Artists, from the 1950s to the Present day: Inj Efflatoun and Gazbia Sirry", AWARE (Archives of Women Artists Research & Exhibitions), https://awarewomenartists.com/en/magazine/femmes-lart-nation-histoire-expositions-de-deux-artistes-egyptiennes-annees-1950-a-nos-jours-inji-efflatoun-gazbia-sirry/
- Azar, Aimé. Femmes peintres d'Egypte. Le Caire: Imprimerie Française, 1953.
- El-Din, Mursi Saad. Gazbia Sirry: Lust for Color. Cairo: American University in Cairo Press, 1998.
- El Razzaz, Mostafa, Sonia Farid, and Ashraf Reda. Inji, Tahia, Gazbia: a life's journey. Cairo: Gallery Picasso, 2014.
- Karnouk, Liliane. "Contemporary Egyptian Art", Cairo: American University in Cairo Press, 1995.
- Okeke-Agulu, Chika."Politics by Other Means: Two Egyptian Artists, Gazbia Sirry and Ghada Amer."Meridians: feminism, race, transnationalism - Volume 6, Number 2, pp. 117-149.Indiana University Press. 2006.
- Seggerman, Alex Dika. Modernism on the Nile: Art in Egypt between the Islamic and the Contemporary. Chapel Hill: UNC Press, 2019.
- Seggerman, Alex Dika. "Gazbia Sirry." Mathaf Encyclopedia, http://encyclopedia.mathaf.org.qa/en/bios/Pages/Gazbia-Sirry.aspx
- Winegar, Jessica. Creative Reckonings: The Politics of Art and Culture in Contemporary Egypt. Stanford, California: Stanford University Press, 2006.
- Mostafa-Kanafani, Fatenn. "Gazbia Sirry." Art Talks, 17 Mar. 2022, https://arttalks.com/artist/gazbia-sirry/.
- Mostafa-Kanafani, Fatenn. "Gazbia Sirry-When Modern Arab Form Meets Politics." Post, 30 June 2021, https://post.moma.org/gazbia-sirry-when-modern-arab-form-meets-politics/. https://post.moma.org/gazbia-sirry-when-modern-arab-form-meets-politics/
- Gazbia Sirry, http://www.zamalekartgallery.com/artists/gazbia_sirry/gazbia_sirry.htm. http://www.zamalekartgallery.com/artists/gazbia_sirry/gazbia_sirry.htm
- "Gazbia Sirry." AWARE Women Artists / Femmes Artistes, https://awarewomenartists.com/en/artiste/gazbia-sirry/. https://awarewomenartists.com/en/artiste/gazbia-sirry/
