= I Want a Solution =

1975 film

- Arabic: أريد حلا
- Directed by: Said Marzouk
- Written by: Husn Shah
- Screenplay by: Said Marzouk; Faten Hamama; Saad El-Din Wahbah
- Produced by: Salah Zulfikar
- Starring: Faten Hamama; Rushdy Abaza
- Cinematography: Mustafa Imam
- Edited by: Said El-Sheikh
- Music by: Gamal Salama
- Production company: Salah Zulfikar Films Company
- Release date: 1975
- Running time: 115 minutes
- Country: Egypt
- Language: Egyptian Arabic

I Want a Solution (Arabic: أريد حلاً, translit.Oridu hallan) is a 1975 Egyptian drama film directed by Said Marzouk and produced by Salah Zulfikar. The film was selected as the Egyptian entry for the Best Foreign Language Film at the 48th Academy Awards, but was not accepted as a nominee. The film criticized the laws governing marriage and divorce in Egypt. The film is listed in Top 100 Egyptian films list and it earned the 1975 Ministry of Culture's best producer award for Salah Zulfikar. The script was written by Husn Shah, Said Marzouk and Faten Hamama. The film is inspired by a true story and it is Marzouk's third feature film.

== Plot ==
The film unveils the injustice of Egypt's personal status laws against women. Doria is an Egyptian woman seeking to divorce her husband Medhat who is a former diplomat with aristocratic background. In flashbacks, we learn that Medhat verbally and physically abused his wife and cheated on her. Doria requested divorce, but according to the Egyptian laws at the time, a woman can only ask for divorce in specific cases.

== Crew ==
- Story: Husn Shah
- Screenwriter: Said Marzouk, Saad el-Din Wahba and Faten Hamama
- Director: Said Marzouk
- Produced by: Salah Zulfikar
- Music: Gamal Salama
- Cinematographer: Mustafa Imam
- Editor: Said El-Sheikh
- Production studio: Salah Zulfikar Films Company
- Distribution: Ihab el-Leithy Films

== Cast ==
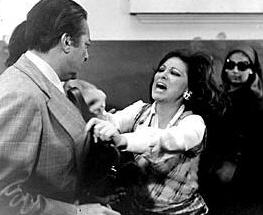
Faten Hamama and Rushdy Abaza in a publicity still from I Want a Solution

=== Primary cast ===
- Faten Hamama as Doria
- Rushdy Abaza as Medhat
- Amina Rizk as Hayat
- Laila Taher as Doria's friend
- Kamal Yassin as Judge
- Muhammad Al-Sabaa as Ahmed Al-Adawy - Doria's lawyer
- Ahmed Tawfik as Hassan Madkour - Medhat's lawyer
- Ragaa Hussein as Saneya
- Nadia Arslan as The Mistress
- Ali Al-Sharif as Abu Al-Wafa - Azhari Sharia lawyer
- Kamal Zulfikar as Hayat's husband
- Shawky Baraka as judge
- Ibrahim Saafan as Badawi - Ardahhalji in court
- Sayed Zayan as Darwish
- Waheed Seif as Abbas
- Osama Abbas as Pharmacist
- Ibrahim Qadri as Witness in court
- Sherif Lotfy as Raouf Azmy

=== Supporting cast ===
- Hesham Selim
- Suhair Sami
- Fathia Shaheen
- Naima Al Sagheer
- Laila Fahmy
- Kawthar Shafik
- Abdul Aleem Khattab
- Hussein Qandil
- Sophie Takla
- Ali Ezz El Din
- Raafat Fahim
- Mahmoud Kamel
- Radwan Hafez
- Marwan Hammad

== See also ==
- Egyptian cinema
- Salah Zulfikar filmography
- List of Egyptian films of 1975
- List of Egyptian films of the 1970s
- List of Egyptian submissions for the Academy Award for Best Foreign Language Film
- List of submissions to the 48th Academy Awards for Best Foreign Language Film
