= Hesham Selim =

Egyptian actor (1958–2022)

- هشام سليم
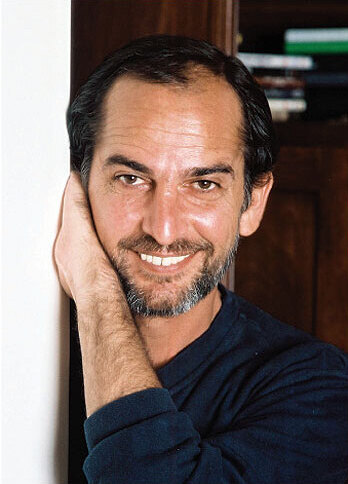
- Born: Hesham Mohamed Saleh Selim; 27 January 1958; Cairo, Egypt
- Died: 22 September 2022 (aged 64); Cairo, Egypt
- Education: Helwan University
- Occupation: Actor
- Years active: 1972–2022
- Children: 3
- Parent: Saleh Selim (father)

Hesham Selim (Arabic: هشام سليم; 27 January 1958 – 22 September 2022) was an Egyptian film and television actor. He is the son of Saleh Selim. He acted in many movies and television series since his childhood.

== Career ==
Selim's first acting role was in Empire M (1972), in which he acted as the son of Faten Hamama. However, he took his schooling seriously and did not act again until he graduated, in which he studied Tourism in Helwan University. Beside his acting career, he hosted the TV show "Hiwar Al Qahira" on Sky News Arabia.

== Personal life ==
Selim was married twice. Mervat El Nahas was his first wife who was the mother of his three children. He then married Nadia Al Ghaleb in 2004. On 5 May 2020, he spoke on television about having a 26-year-old transgender son, in a rare public show of support for LGBT+ rights in the conservative Muslim majority country.

On 22 September 2022, he died of lung cancer after several months in hospital.

== Selected filmography ==
- Bahethat an al horeya, Al (2005)
- Kalam fel hob (2005)
- Enta omry (2004) .... Hesham (the doctor)
- Mahmoud Al-Masri (2004) TV series
- Leqaa ala al hawaa (2004) TV series .... Omar
- Malak rohi (2003) TV series .... Young Abdel Majid
- Banat, El (2003) TV mini-series .... Kamal
- El Nazer (2000)
- Assifa, Al (2000)... aka The Storm (International: English title)
- Ard el ahlam (1993) .... Magdi (son)... aka Land of Dreams (International: English title)
- Leighb maa al shayatin, Al (1991)
- Gabalawi, Al (1991)
- Iskanderija, kaman oue kaman (1990) (as Hisham Selim)... aka Alexandria Again and Forever
- Qesma wa nasib (1990)
- Khadem, Al (1990)... aka The Servant (literal English title)
- Fedihat al omr (1989)... aka A Lifetime Scandal (literal English title)
- Aragoz, al- (1989)... aka The Puppeteer (literal English title)
- Eghteyal modaresa (1988)... aka Assassination of a Teacher (literal English title)
- Fortunes of War .... Student (1 episode, 1987)
- Maloughb, Al (1987)
- Atshana (1987)... aka Thirsty (literal English title)
- Saat al fazagh (1986)... aka Hours of Scare
- Enteqam, -al (1986)... aka The Revenge (literal English title)
- Min fadlik wa ihsanik (1986)… aka Please and Your Kindness (literal English title)
- Satrak ya rab (1986)
- Ragol lehaza alzaman (1986)... aka A Man for This Time
- Zeyara al akhira, -al (1986)... aka The Last Visit
- Ragab al wahsh (1985)
- Sanawat al khatar (1985)... aka Years of Danger
- Basamat fawk al maa (1985)... aka Prints on the Sea
- La tasalni man ana (1984)... aka Don't Ask Me Who I Am
- Tazwir fi awrak rasmeya (1984)... aka Falsification of Legal Documents
- Awdat al ibn al dal (1976) .... Ibrahim... aka The Return of the Prodigal Son
- Emberatoriet meem (1972)... aka Empire M

== Television ==
- Kalabsh 3 (2019)
- Malak rohi (2003)
- Amaken Fel Qalb (2005)
- Lahazat Harega Critical moments (2007).
- Harb elgawasis Spies war (2009).

== See also ==
- Collège de la Sainte Famille
- List of Egyptians
