= The Angel of Mercy (film) =

- Raqiya Ibrahim (left) and Faten Hamama (right) in Malak al-Rahma
- Directed by: Youssef Wahbi
- Written by: Youssef Wahbi
- Produced by: Gabriel Nahas; Ramses Naguib
- Starring: Faten Hamama; Raqiya Ibrahim; Youssef Wahbi
- Cinematography: Sami Brail
- Edited by: Kamal El Sheikh
- Music by: Abdelhalim Newairah
- Release date: 1946
- Country: Egypt
- Language: Arabic

The Angel of Mercy (Arabic: ملاك الرحمة, translit. Malak al-Rahma) is a 1946 Egyptian drama film directed and written by Youssef Wahbi. It stars Wahbi, Faten Hamama, Raqiya Ibrahim, Farid Shawqi, and Nejma Ibrahim.

== Plot ==
Fouad Bek is married to Imtethal and has a daughter, Thoraya, who lives in Istanbul with her grandparents. Before Imtethal's mother dies, she reveals a secret she has been keeping to her daughter. She also has a son out of wedlock, and tells her where he is. Imtehal meets her brother, Zaki, who tries to trick her and steal from her. He even threatens her with letters. One day, Fouad finds a letter from Zaki. He misunderstands what the letter discloses and thinks that his wife is having an affair with this man. Thoraya returns to Egypt and finds that her parents have divorced.

== Cast ==
- Faten Hamama as Thoraya.
- Negma Ibrahim as the grandmother.
- Raqiya Ibrahim as Imtethal.
- Farid Shawqi as Zaki.
- Youssef Wahbi as Fouad Bek.
