= Mohammed Karim =

Egyptian director (1896–1972)

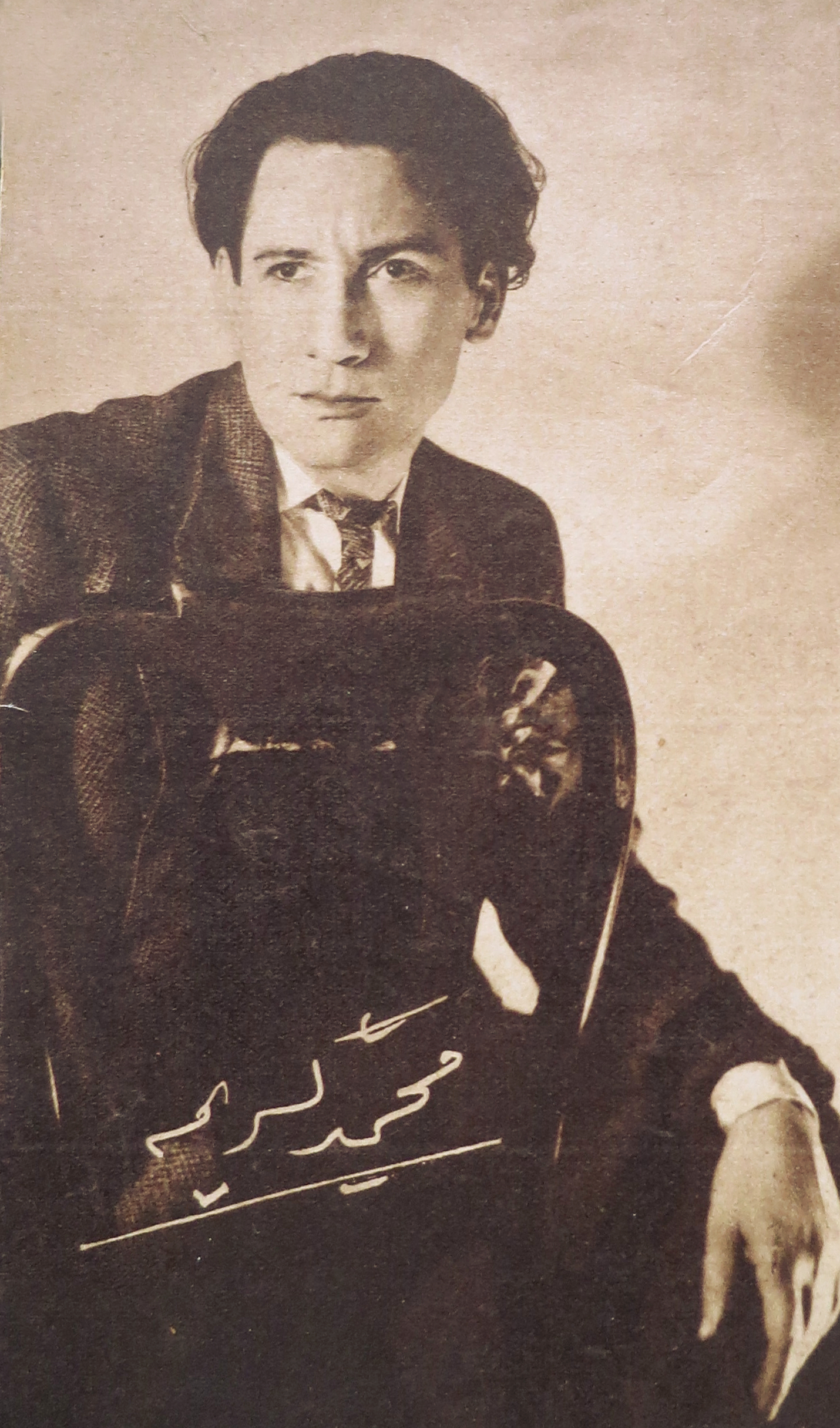
- Born: December 8, 1896; Abdeen, Cairo
- Died: March 27, 1972 (aged 75)
- Citizenship: Egypt
- Occupation: film director . producer . writer

Mohammed Karim (1896–1972) (Arabic: محمد كريم) was an Egyptian actor, film director, writer, and producer, and is considered one of the most prominent figures in Egyptian cinematic history. He is credited as the first Egyptian film actor.

== Biography ==
Mohammed Karim was born on December 8, 1896, in Abdeen, Cairo. Karim's journey into cinema began in 1917 when he learned that Italy's first film company, the Italian Cinematographic Society (SITCIA), had come to Alexandria to make a film. Eager to be involved, he sent them thirty-six photos but was initially rejected due to his lack of proficiency in Italian and French. Six months later, after learning Italian, he sent eighty-six new photos and was given the chance for a screen test. On July 20, 1918, Karim debuted as an officer in The Honour of the Bedouin (Charaf el Badawî), followed by a small role in The Deadly Flowers (el Azhâr el Momîta).

== Career ==
In the early 1920s, Karim traveled to Italy, where he appeared in small roles in two Italian films, Camello's Revenge and Messaline. From there, he moved to Germany, where he participated in German films and studied at UFA Studios on the filming of Metropolis. It was though his work with UFA that Karim began directing and decided to pursue filmmaking as his primary career.

Karim returned to Egypt in 1926 and created a short documentary for the Misr Acting & Cinema Company (The Egyptian Company for Acting and Cinema), Hada'iq al-Hayawan (The Zoological Gardens, 1970). His first silent feature, Zaynab (1930), was the first long narrative film produced in Egypt, based on an Egyptian novel by Dr. Muhammad Hussayn Haykal.

Karim is also credited with directing Egypt’s first talking picture, Awlad al-Zawat (Children of the Aristocracy, 1932). He contributed to Al-Warda al-Bayda' (The White Rose, 1933), Egypt's first musical, which featured singer Muhammad Abd al-Wahab. Karim directed all of Abd al-Wahab's films from 1933 to 1944. His 1932 film Fils à Papa, though produced in Paris, was an Egyptian venture and further solidified his influence in the film industry.

Karim also played a key role in launching the careers of several new talents. He cast the nine-year-old Faten Hamama in Yawm Sa'id (Happy Day, 1940) and helped guide her career. Karim brought Faten Hamama to fame in the movie Yawm Said. His 1946 film Dunia was entered into the 1946 Cannes Film Festival. In 1956, his film Dalila became the first Egyptian film to use CinemaScope, demonstrating his awareness of cinematic innovations.

Near the end of his career, Karim became the first dean of the Cairo Higher Institute of Cinema. His accomplishments earned him the title "Sheikh of Directors."

== Death ==
Mohammed Karim died on March 27, 1972.

== Works ==
Short Films:

- 1927: The Zoo (Hadîkat el hayawân)
- 1931: Co-operation (El Ta’awon)
- 1949: Meet Boulbol
- 1953: The Song of the Valley (Oghneyat nashîd el Wadî)
- 1954: Police Academy (Koleyat el Bolis)
- 1955: The Good Day (Youm el hana)
- 1956: All is Well (Kolloh Tamam)

Feature Films:

- 1930: Zaynab
- 1932: Sons of Aristocrats
- 1933: The White Rose (el Wardah el baydâ)
- 1935: The Tears of Love (Doumo’ el houbb)
- 1938: Long Live Love (Yahya el hub)
- 1939: Yom Saeed
- 1942: Love is Forbidden (Mamnou’ el houbb)
- 1944: A Bullet in the Heart (Rasâsah fî-l-qalb)
- 1946: Dunia
- 1946: Their Excellencies (Ashâb el sa’âdah)
- 1946: I am not an Angel (Lastou malâkan)
- 1948: A Love that does not Die (Houbb lâ yamout)
- 1952: Nahed (Nâhid)
- 1952: Zeinab (Zeinab)
- 1954: The Madness of Love (Gounoun el houbb)
- 1956: Dalila (Dalîlah)
- 1959: A Heart of Gold (Qalb min dhahab)

== See also ==
- Egyptian Cinema
