= Rania Farid Shawki =

Egyptian actress (born 1974)

Rania Farid Shawqi
- رانيا فريد شوقي
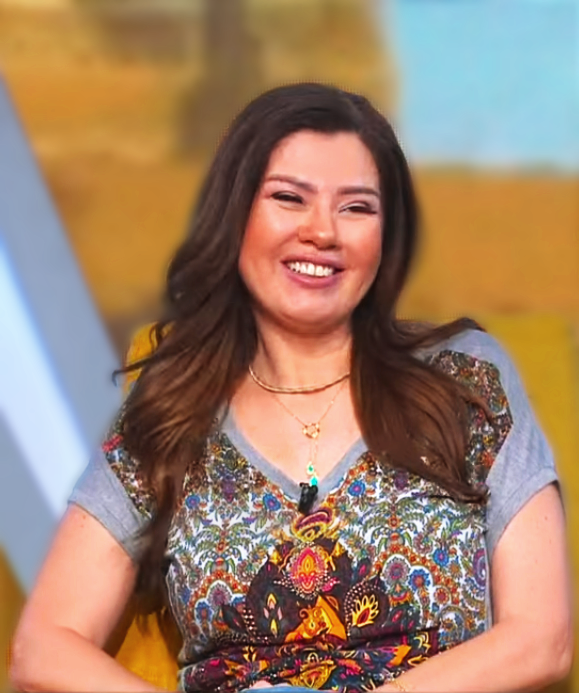
- Born: October 9, 1974 (age 52); Cairo, Egypt
- Occupation: Actress
- Spouse: Mostafa Fahmy (m. 2007; div. 2012)
- Father: Farid Shawqi
- Relatives: Nahed El Sebai (half-niece)

Rania Farid Shawki (Arabic: رانيا فريد شوقي; born October 9, 1974) is an Egyptian actress.

== Biography ==
Rania Farid Shawki was born October 9, 1974, in Cairo. She made her acting debut with a light-comedy movie called Ah... Wa Ah Men Sharbat, in 1992. She has appeared in many films and television series. She married actor Mostafa Fahmy in 2007, but they divorced in 2012.

== Filmography ==
=== Film ===
- 1992: Ah... Wa Ah Men Sharbat
- 1993: Tameia bialshata
- 1994: The Gambler
- 1996: The Deadly Call
- 2006: Kalam Fil Hob

=== Series ===
- 2021: Well Bred
- 2020: Master Stroke
- 2018: Father of the Bride
- 2018: Awalem Khafea
- 2017: Qasr Al-Oshaq
- 2013: Selsal Al Dam
- 2013: Weak Point
- 2012: Brothers but Enemies
- 2009: Ismail Yasin (Abo Dehka Genan)
- 2007: Yetraba Fi Ezoo
- 2004: White Abbas in the Black Day
- 2002: Joha elmasry
