= House No. 13 (film) =

Al-Manzel Raqam 13 المنزل رقم 13
- Al-Manzel Raqam 13 poster
- Directed by: Kamal El Sheikh
- Starring: Faten Hamama; Mahmoud El-Meliguy; Emad Hamdy
- Release date: September 23, 1952
- Country: Egypt
- Language: Arabic

Al-Manzel Raqam 13 or Al-Manzel Raqam Talata`sh (Arabic: المنزل رقم 13, House No. 13) is a classic 1952 Egyptian mystery/crime film directed by Kamal El Sheikh. It starred Faten Hamama, Mahmoud El Meliguy, and Emad Hamdy and was chosen as one of the best 150 Egyptian film productions in 1996, during the Egyptian Cinema centennial.

== Plot ==
A psychotic psychiatrist has killed a young man, `Abbas, and plans a conspiracy. He convinces his friend and patient, Sharif, that he had killed `Abbas after hypnotizing him. He also orders Sharif to give him the money that `Abbas's wife should receive, all to make Sharif seem like the suspect. Sharif is believed to have killed `Abbas for the money, and is shockingly arrested during his wedding.
