= Mahmoud Nasr =

Egyptian cinematographer

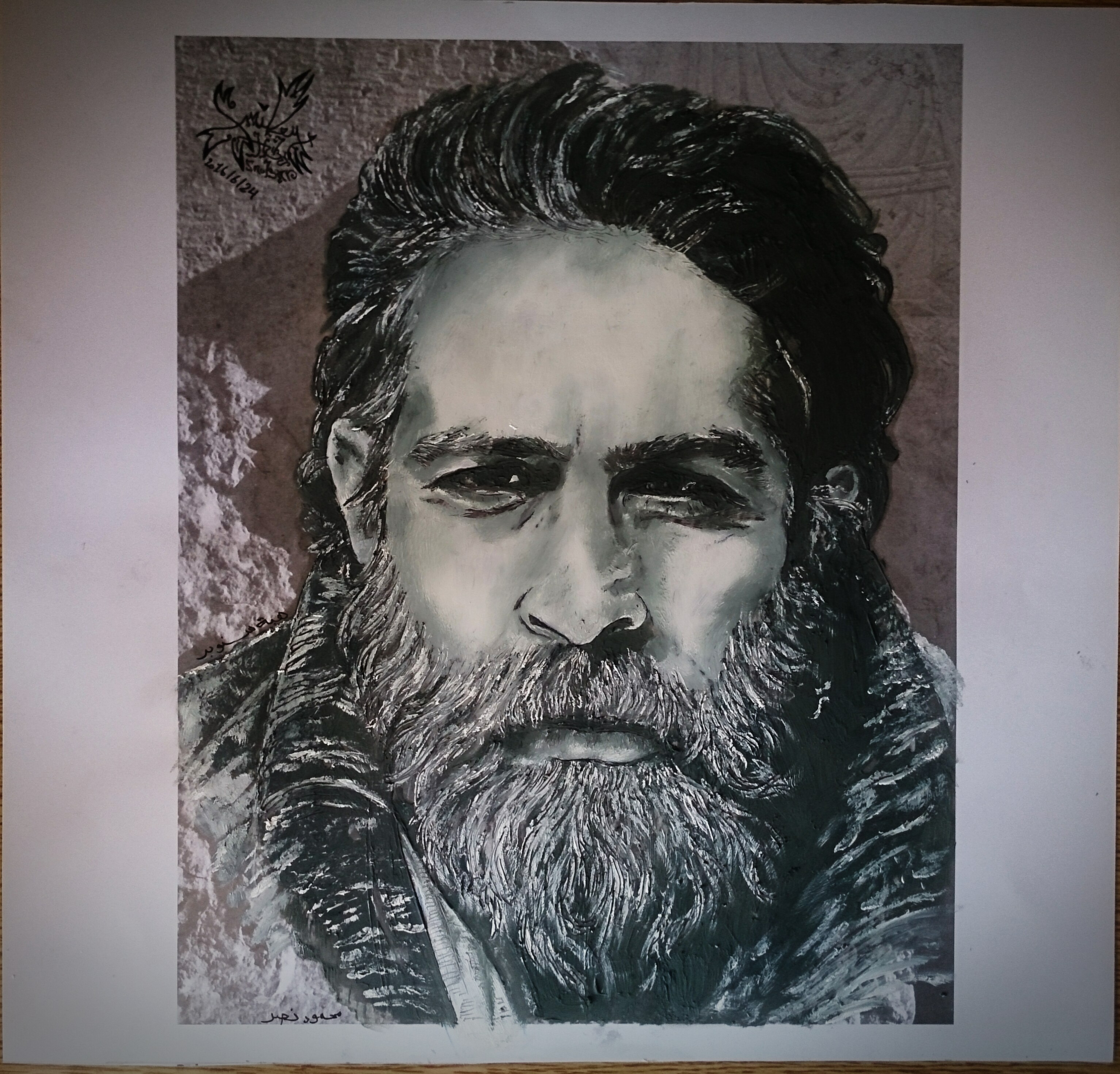
- Citizenship: Egypt
- Occupation: Cinematographer

Mahmoud Nasr (Arabic: محمود نصر) was a critically acclaimed Egyptian cinematographer of the 1950s and 1960s.

He worked in the Egyptian film industry between 1949 and 1969 and shot acclaimed Egyptian films such as Ard el salam (1957), Aghla Min Hayati (1965) and The Man Who Lost His Shadow (1968).

== Filmography ==
- Moutarada gharamia (1968)
- Ragol el-lazi fakad zilloh, El (1968)

... a.k.a. The Man Who Lost His Shadow (International: English title: informal literal title)

- Agazet gharam (1967)
- Moukhareboun, Al (1967)
- Aghla Min Hayati (1965)
- Talata yuhebbunaha, El (1966) (director of photography)

... a.k.a. All Three Love Her (International: English title)

- Morahekan, El (1964)

... a.k.a. The Two Young Men (International: English title)

- Ana hurra (1958)

... a.k.a. I Am Free (International: English title)

- Hatta naltaki (1958)

... a.k.a. I'll See You (International: English title)

- La anam (1958)

... a.k.a. No Tomorrow (International: English title)

- Zoja el azraa, El (1958) (director of photography)

... a.k.a. The Virgin Wife (International: English title)

- Ard el salam (1957)

... a.k.a. Land of Peace (International: English title)

- Kursi el iteraf (1949)

... a.k.a. The Secret of the Confessional (International: English title)
