= Traces in the Sand =

Athar Fi al-Rimal
- Directed by: Gamal Madkoor
- Starring: Imad Hamdi; Faten Hamama
- Release date: 1954
- Country: Egypt
- Language: Arabic

Athar Fi al-Rimal (Arabic: أثار في الرمال, Traces in the Sand) is a 1954 Egyptian drama film directed by Gamal Madkoor. It starred Imad Hamdi and Faten Hamama.

Faten Hamama plays Ragia, a woman who helps Ibrahim (Imad Hamdi) retain his memory and tell the story of his sister's death.
