= The Blazing Sun (1954 film) =

- Theatrical release poster
- Arabic: صراع في الوادي
- Directed by: Youssef Chahine
- Written by: Ali El Zorkani; Helmy Halim
- Produced by: Gabriel Telhamy; Mustafa Hasan
- Starring: Faten Hamama; Omar Sharif; Zaki Rostom; Abdel Waress Assar; Farid Shawki; Hamdy Gheith
- Cinematography: Ahmed Khorshed
- Edited by: Kamal Abou El Ela
- Music by: Fouad El Zahiri
- Production company: Nile Cinema Company
- Distributed by: Nile Cinema Company
- Release date: 25 March 1954 (Cannes)
- Running time: 116 minutes
- Country: Egypt
- Language: Arabic
- Box office: +25.8 million tickets (Soviet Union)

The Blazing Sun (Arabic: صراع في الوادي, Ṣira‘ Fī al-Wādī) is a 1954 Egyptian romance drama film directed by Youssef Chahine and written by Helmy Halim and Ali El Zorkani. Starring Omar Sharif (in his film debut) and Faten Hamama, it follows a class conflict in south Egypt near the Nile, when a wealthy landlord floods a village to prevent the peasant living there from making a profit off their crops.

The film premiered at the main competition of the 1954 Cannes Film Festival, under the name The Blazing Sky. In 1996, during the Egyptian Cinema centennial, this film was selected as one of the 150 best Egyptian films.

== Plot ==
In 1951, Ahmed Salam is a young engineer who works to improve the peasant life and crop, increasing the sugarcane production in their village near the Nile. He is the son of Saber Abdul Salam, a sugarcane peasant, who works for Taher Pasha, a wealthy landlord who feels threatened by the villager's newfound prosperity.

Ahmed shares a forbidden with his childhood sweetheart Amal, the only daughter of the Pasha. As Amal returns from Cairo, she visits the village during a wedding ceremony, but realizes she is overshadowing the party.

Taher, alongside with his nephew, Riad, floods the peasant's sugar cane crops in order to protect his own wealth. After the peasant crops are destroyed, the village Sheikh is the only person to suspect that the Pasha is responsible. The Pasha soon learns of a heated dispute that occurred between Saber and the Sheikh. Using this to his benefit, he allows Riad to steal Saber's rifle and set up a conspiracy killing the Sheikh in his prayer.

Saber Effendi is immediately blamed by the angry villagers and is found guilty by the court after testimony by Hassan, the only witness to Saber's innocence. Unbeknownst to the community, Hassan secretly conspired with the Pasha to kill the Sheikh. Hassan turns against Saber, and he is sentenced to death. Riad forces the Pasha to accept his proposal to marry Amal.

Selim, the Shiekh's son, prepares to kill Ahmed to further avenge the Sheikh's death, and shoots him in the chest. The injured Ahmed pursuits Hassan, who reveals Riad killed the Sheikh, but is struck and killed by a train. Ahmed is escorted by the police to his home, where Salim awaits to kill him.

Saber is executed in the following morning. Amal, running from home after being harassed by Riad, tries to convince Ahmed to runaway and confess her feelings to him. Hiding in an ancient temple in the desert, Ahmed agrees to let Amal find help. She later discovers her father's involvement in Sheikh's death.

Followed to the temple, Amal reveals the truth to Ahmed, but is shot by Riad. Riad attempts to kill Ahmed, and Selim simultaneously holds Ahmed at gun point. Riad kills the Pasha, as he arrives in the temple and reveals the truth to Selim. Selim apologizes to Ahmed, and they both turn Riad over to the police. Ahmed and Amal embrace and walk off into the distance.

== Cast ==
- Faten Hamama as Amal
- Omar Sharif as Ahmed
- Zaki Rostom as Taher Pasha
- Abdel Waress Assar as Saber Abdul Salam, Ahmed's father
- Farid Shawqi as Ryiad
- Hamdy Gheith as Selim
- Abdel Ghani Qamar as Hassan
- Mansi Fahmy as the Sheikh

== Release ==
The film had its world premiere at the main competition of the 1954 Cannes Film Festival, under the name The Blazing Sky. It was a box office hit in the Soviet Union, where it sold 25.8 million tickets in 1956.

In 1996, during the Egyptian Cinema centennial, this film was selected as one of the 150 best Egyptian films.
