= Land of Peace =

- Directed by: Kamal El Sheikh
- Written by: Ali El Zorkani; Helmy Halim
- Produced by: Helmy Halim
- Starring: Omar Sharif; Faten Hamama
- Cinematography: Mahmoud Nasr
- Music by: Muhamed Elmogi
- Release date: 1957
- Country: Egypt
- Language: Arabic

Land of Peace (Arabic: أرض السلام, translit. Ard al-Salam) is a 1957 Egyptian war/drama film directed by Kamal El Sheikh. It stars Omar Sharif and Faten Hamama. In this film, most of the characters speak Palestinian Arabic.

== Plot ==
The film takes place in Palestine and portrays the lives of freedom fighters trying to free their village from the control of the Israelis. Ahmed (Omar Sharif) is an Egyptian freedom fighter who ends up in this village. There, he meets Salma, a girl from the village. Together they try to save the Palestinians and always escape danger. Their friendship evolves into a love relationship and they marry each other.

== Cast ==
Omar Sharif and Faten Hamama in a scene from the film

- Faten Hamama as Salma
- Omar Sharif as Ahmed
- Abdel Salam Al Nabulsy as Hamdan
- Tewfik El Dekn as Khalid
- Abdel Waress Assar as Mazen (Salma's father)
- Fakher Fakher as Abed
- Faida Kamel as neighbor and a singer
- Ehsan Sherif as Rukaya
