= Faten Hamama =

Egyptian actress and producer (1931–2015)

ORE Faten Hamama
- فاتن حمامة
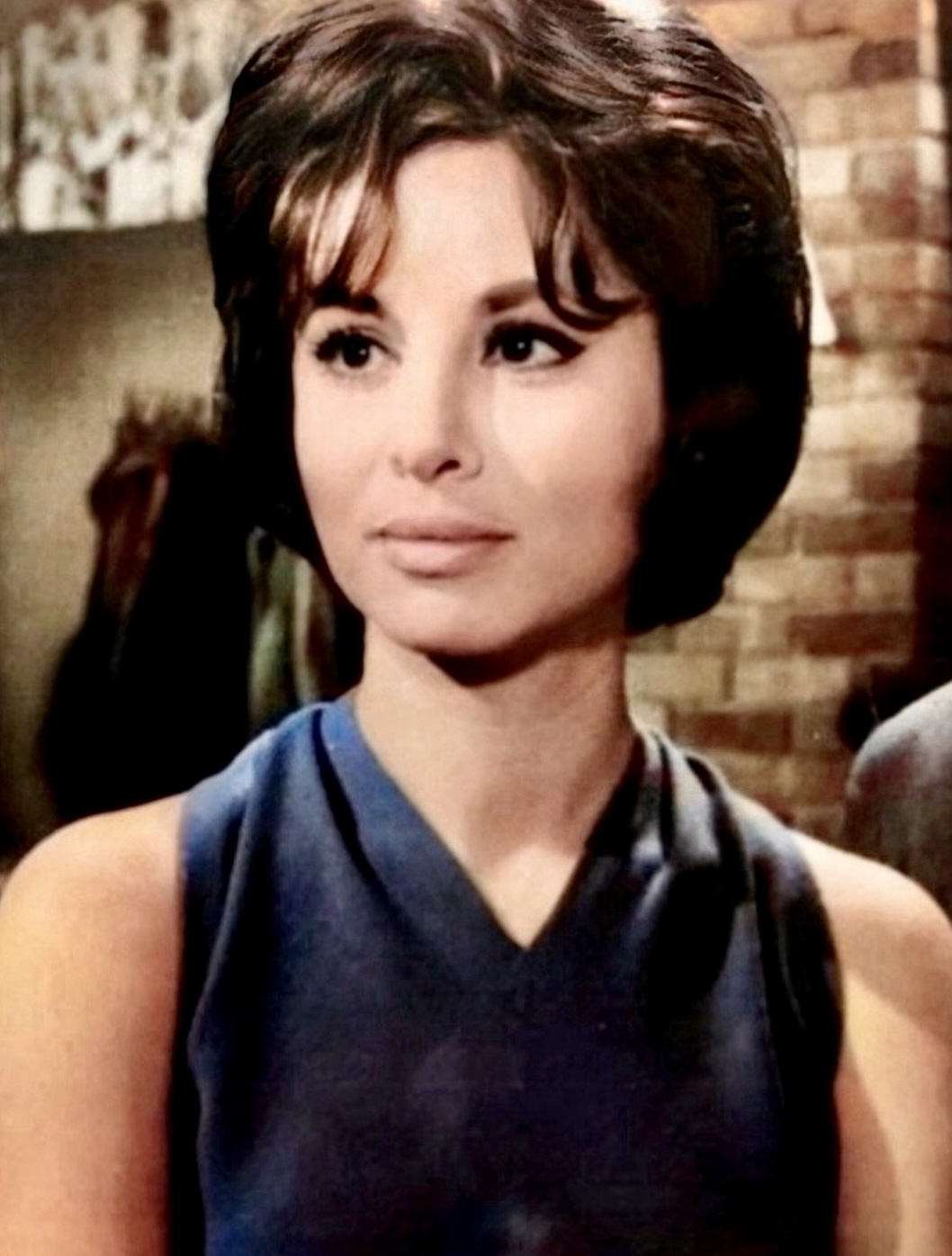
- Hamama in 1963
- Born: Faten Ahmed Hamama; 27 May 1931; El Senbellawein, Kingdom of Egypt
- Died: 17 January 2015 (aged 83); Cairo, Egypt
- Other names: "The First Lady of Egyptian and Arabic Cinema"
- Occupations: Actress; film producer; screenwriter
- Years active: 1940–2001
- Notable work: Full list
- Spouses: Ezz El-Dine Zulficar (m. 1947; div. 1954) Omar Sharif (m. 1955; div. 1974) Mohamed Abdel Wahab Mahmoud (m. 1975)
- Children: 2
- Relatives: Omar Sharif Jr. (grandson)
- Honours: Order of the Republic - Grand Cordon; Order of Sciences and Arts

Faten Ahmed Hamama (Arabic: فاتن أحمد حمامة, pronounced [ˈfæːten ˈæħmæd ħæˈmæːmæ]; 27 May 1931 – 17 January 2015) was an Egyptian film and television actress and film producer. She made her screen debut in 1939, when she was only seven years old. Her earliest roles were minor, but her activity and gradual success helped to establish her as a distinguished Egyptian actress, later revered as an icon in Egyptian cinema. In 1996, nine of the films she starred in were included in the Top hundred films in the history of Egyptian cinema by the cinema critics of Cairo International Film Festival.

After a seven-year hiatus from acting, Hamama returned in 2000 in what was a much anticipated television series, Wageh El Amar (وجه القمر, Face of the Moon). Hamama substantially helped in improving the cinema industry in Egypt and emphasizing the importance of women in cinema and Egyptian society. In 2000, she was selected as Star of the Century by the Egyptian Writers and Critics organization. She was married three times, first to Ezz El-Dine Zulficar and then to Omar Sharif.

== Early life and career ==
Faten Hamama was born in 1931 to an Egyptian lower middle class family in El Senbellawein (according to her birth certificate), but she claimed to have been born in the Abdeen quarter of Cairo. She has an older brother, Mounir, a younger sister, Layla and a younger brother, Mazhar. Her aspiration for acting arose at an early age. When she was six years old, her father took her to the theater to see an Assia Dagher film; when the audience clapped for Assia, she told her father she felt they were clapping for her.

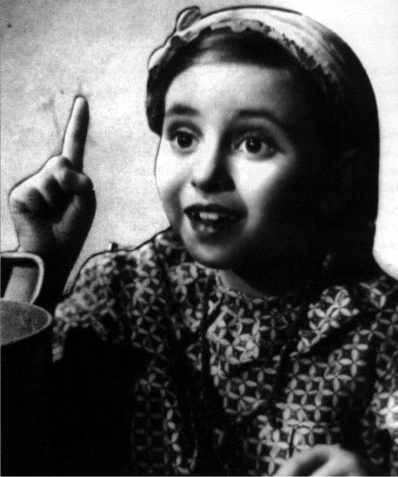
Hamama in her film debut, Happy Day (1940)

When she won a children's beauty pageant in Egypt, her father sent her picture to the director Mohamed Karim who was looking for a young female child to play the role of a small girl with the famous Egyptian actor and musician Mohamed Abdel Wahab in the film Youm Sai'd (يوم سعيد, A Happy Day, 1939). After an audition, Abdel Wahab decided she was the one he was looking for. After her role in the film, people called her "Egypt's own Shirley Temple". The director liked her acting and was impressed with her so much that he signed a contract with her father. Four years later, she was chosen by Karim for another role with Abdel Wahab in the film Rossassa Fel Qalb (رصاصه فى القلب, Bullet in the Heart, 1944) and in another film two years later, Dunya (دنيا, Universe, 1946). After her success, Hamama moved with her parents to Cairo and started her study at the High Institute of Acting in 1946.

== Career ==
Youssef Wahbi, an Egyptian actor and director, recognised the young actress's talent so he offered her a lead role in the 1946 film Malak al-Rahma (ملاك الرحمه, Angel of Mercy). The film attracted widespread media attention, and Hamama, who was only 15 at the time, became famous for her melodramatic role.

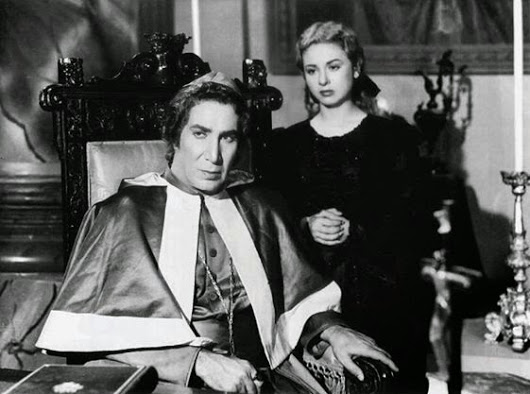
Hamama with Youssef Wahbi in Korsi el-e'traf (1949)

In 1949, Hamama had roles in three films with Wahbi: Korsi el-e'traf (كرسى الاعتراف, Chair of Confession), Al-Yateematain (اليتيمتين, The Two Orphans) and Sitt al-Bayt (ست البيت, Lady of the House). All were successful films. The 1950s were the beginning of the golden age of the Egyptian cinema industry, and Hamama played a significant part. In 1950, she starred alongside Mahmoud Zulfikar in the fantasy film; Akhlaq lil baye (أخلاق للبيع, Virtue for Sale, 1950). In 1951, she starred in the film Lak Yawm Ya Zalem (لك يوم يا ظالم, Your Day will Come) which was nominated at the Cannes Film Festival for the Prix International award. She also played lead roles in Yousef Shaheen's Baba Amin (بابا أمين, Amin, my Father, 1950) and Sira` Fi al-Wadi (صراع فى الوادى, Struggle in the Valley, 1954)l, which was a strong nominee at the 1954 Cannes Film Festival for the Prix International award. Hamama is also known for having played the lead role in the first Egyptian mystery film Al-Manzel Raqam 13 (المنزل رقم 13, House Number 13). In 1959, she starred in the Ezz El-Dine Zulficar's romantic classic, Bain Al Atlal (بين الأطلال, Among the Ruins) with her favorite 1950s co-star Emad Hamdy and Egypt's new rising leading man Salah Zulfikar.

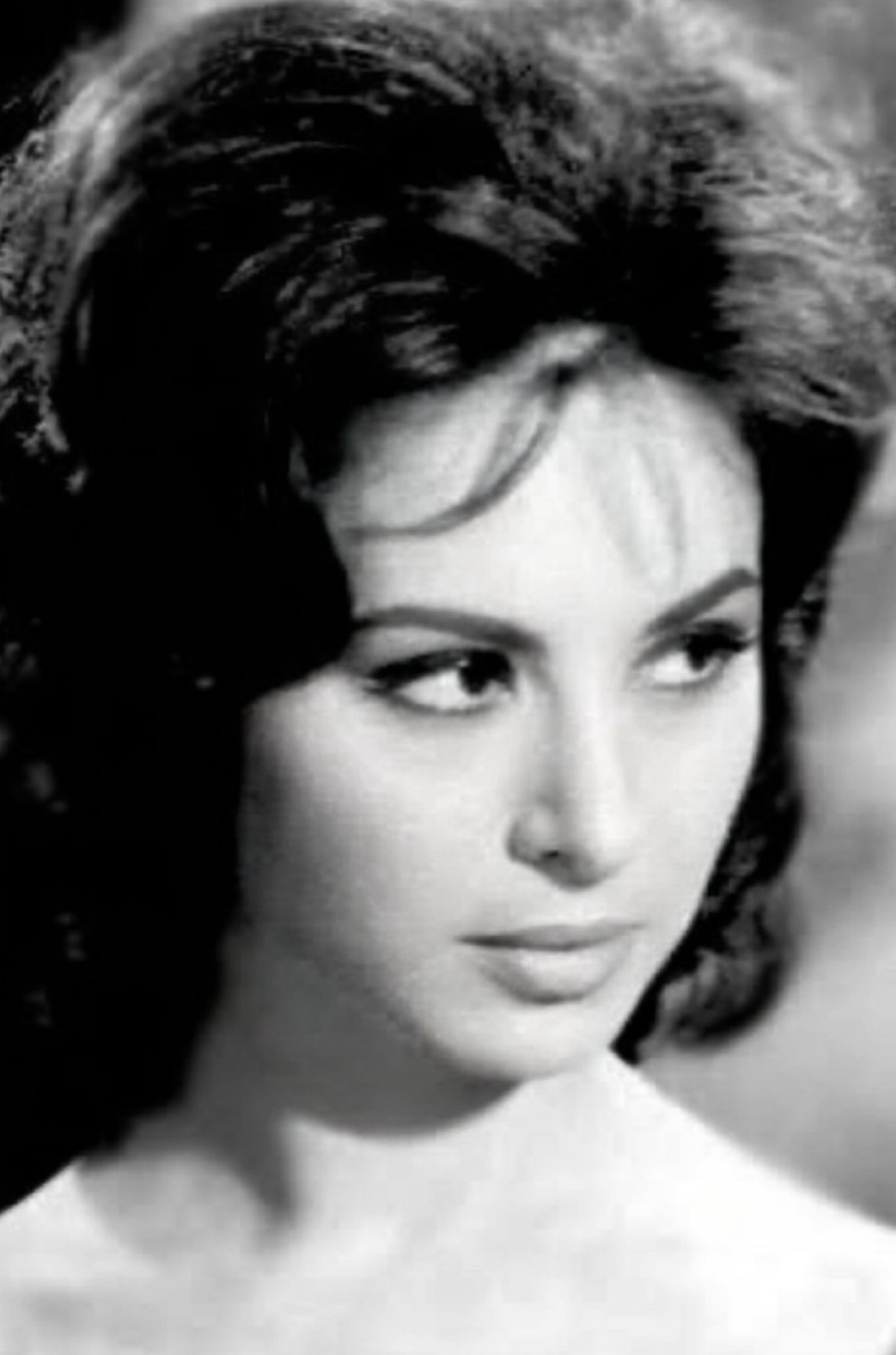
Faten Hamama in 1962

In 1963, she received an award for her role in the political film La Waqt Lel Hob (لا وقت للحب, No Time for Love). Hamama was also able to make it to Hollywood; in 1963 she had a role in the crime film, Cairo. In 1947, Hamama married producer/film director Ezz El-Dine Zulficar while filming the Abu Zayd al-Hilali (أبو زيد الهلالى ) film. They started a production company which produced the film Maw`ed Ma` al-Hayat (موعد مع الحياه, Date with Life) in which she starred. This film earned her the title of the "lady of the Arabic screen". She and Zulficar were divorced in 1954. One year later, she married Egyptian film star Omar Sharif. Meanwhile, Hamama continued to act in films directed by her first husband Zulficar, who was also married in the same year to fellow actress Kawthar Shafik.

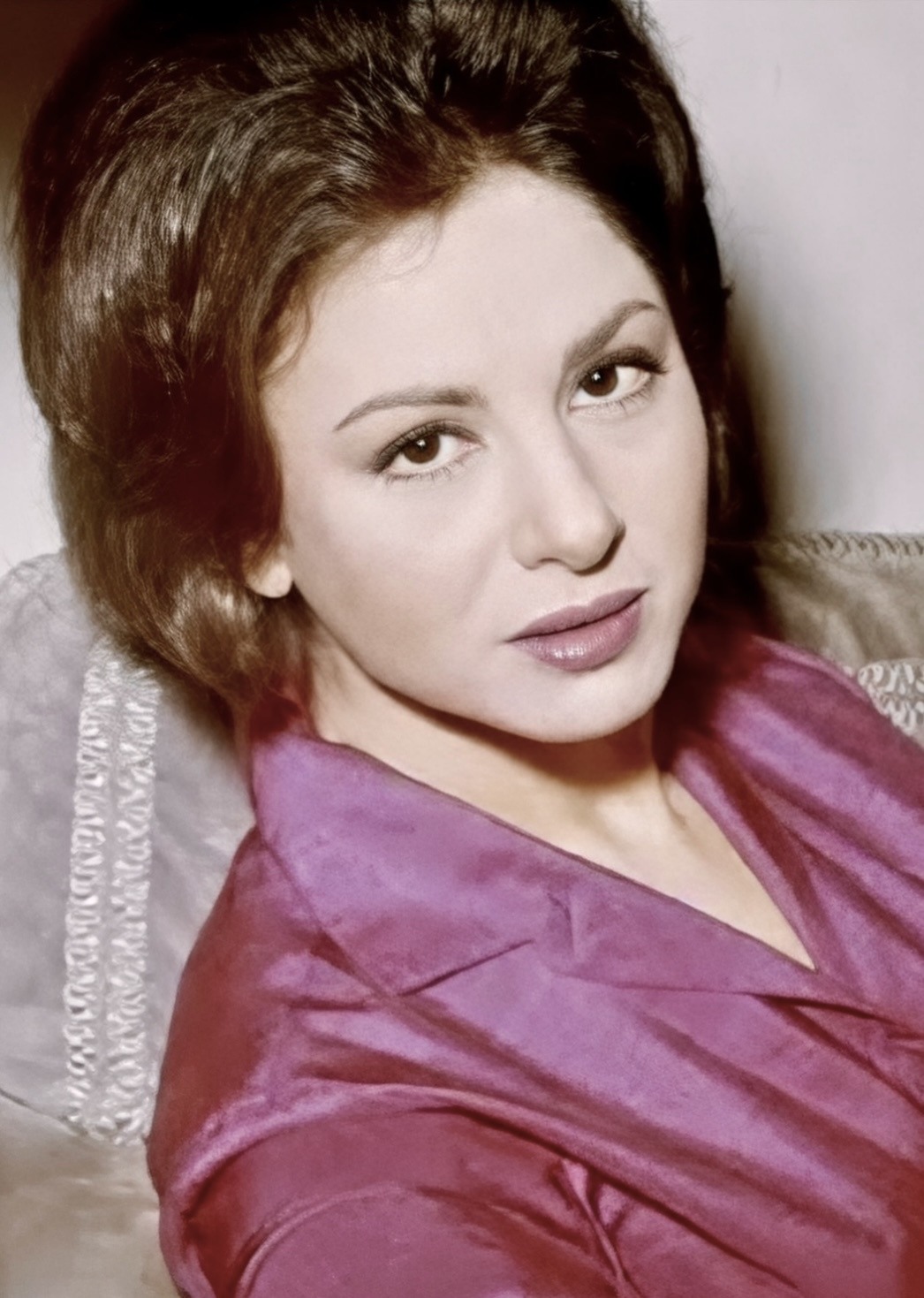
Hamama in 1965

In 1954, while filming a Youssef Chahine film, Struggle in the Valley, Hamama refused to have the Egyptian actor Shukry Sarhan as a co-star, and Chahine offered Omar Sharif the role. Sharif had just graduated from college then and was working for his father; she accepted him as her co-star. Hamama's marriage to Sharif in 1955 started a new era of her career, in which the couple made many films together. Omar Sharif and Faten Hamama were the romantic leads of Ayyamna al-Holwa (أيامنا الحلوه, Our Sweet Days), Ard al-Salam (أرض السلام, Land of Peace), La Anam (لا أنام, Sleepless) and Sayyidat al-Qasr (سيدة القصر, The Lady of the Palace). Their last film together before their divorce was Ezz El-Dine Zulficar's Nahr al-Hob (نهر الحب, The River of Love) in 1960.

=== Controversy in the late 1960s ===
Hamama left Egypt from 1966 to 1970, claiming that she was being harassed by Egyptian Intelligence. She had been a supporter of the 1952 Revolution, but later became an opponent of the Free Officers and their oppressive regime. She said they were "asking her to cooperate" but she apologized and refused. In consequence, she was forbidden to travel or participate in film festivals. She was only able to leave Egypt after many serious disputes, where she lived for a while in Paris, London and Lebanon.

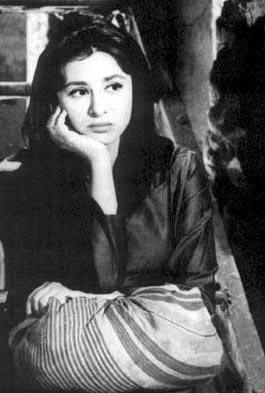
Hamama in Al Haram (1965)

While she was away, then President Gamal Abdel Nasser asked famous writers, journalists and friends to try to convince her to return to Egypt. He called her a "national treasure" and even awarded her an honorary decoration in 1965, which she accepted. However, from 1966, she did not return until February 1970. Following her return she played roles conveying messages of democracy. Her first film after her return to Egypt was alongside the Egyptian leading movie star Salah Zulfikar in the 1971 TV short film named Witch (ساحرة, Sahira), and in the same year, she starred in the 1971 film Thin Thread (الخيط الرفيع, Al Khait Al Rafie). She often criticized the laws in Egypt in her films.

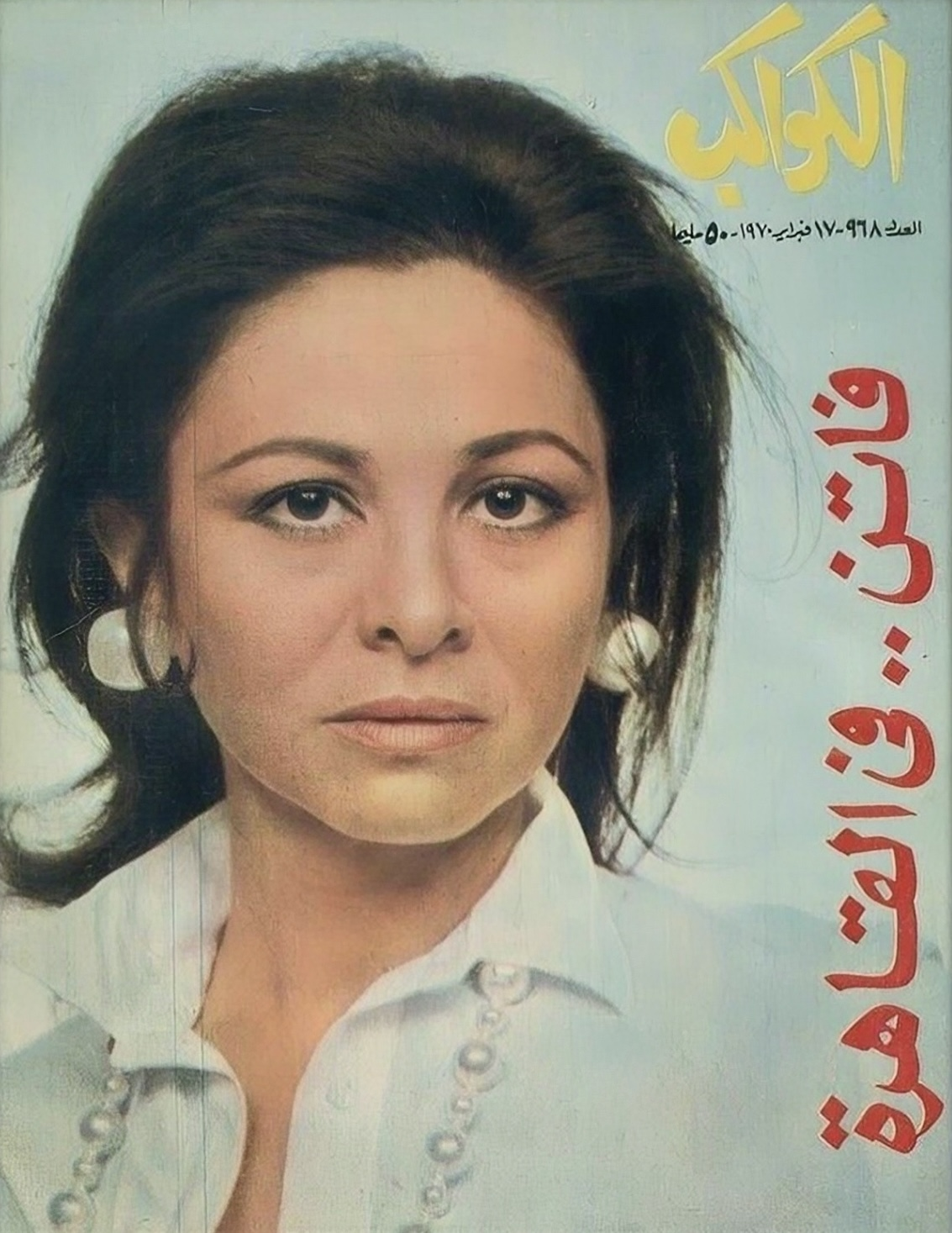
Hamama on the cover of Al Kawakib magazine upon her return to Cairo, February 1970

In the 1972 film Imbratoriyat Meem (إمبراطورية ميم, The Empire of M), Hamama presented a pro-democratic point of view and received an award from the Soviet Union of Women in the Moscow International Film Festival. Her most significant film was Oridu Hallan (أريد حلاً, I Want a Solution), produced by Salah Zulfikar through his production company; Salah Zulfikar Films Company. In this film, she criticised laws governing marriage and divorce in Egypt. After the film, the Egyptian government abrogated a law that forbade wives from divorcing their husbands, therefore allowing khul'.

=== Later career ===
As Hamama aged, her acting roles declined and she made fewer films compared to earlier in her career, but nevertheless her films were successful. She made her first television appearances in her late career. She starred in the TV mini-series Damir Ablah Hekmat (ضمير أبله حكمت, Mrs. Hekmat's Conscience).

After 1993, her career stalled. It was not until 2000 that she returned in the successful TV mini-series Wajh ِِal-Qamar which was broadcast on 23 TV channels in the Middle East. In this mini-series, Hamama portrayed and criticized many problems in Egyptian and Middle Eastern society. Despite some criticisms, the mini-series received much praise and acclaim. Hamama was awarded the Egyptian Best TV Actor of the Year and the mini-series won the Best TV Series Award in the Egyptian Radio and Television Festival. She entered history as the highest-paid actress in an Egyptian television miniseries until 2006, when another actress was paid more.

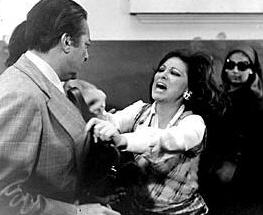
Hamama, with Rushdy Abaza, in I Want a Solution (1974)

Before the 1950s, Hamama had leading roles in 30 films, in which she often played the role of a weak, empathetic, poor girl. After the 1950s, Hamama was in search of her real identity and was trying to establish herself as a distinct figure. During this period, her choice of material and roles was somewhat limited. However, film producers soon capitalised on her popularity with audiences in local and Middle Eastern markets. She began to play realistic, strong women, such as in Sira' Fi Al-Wadi (صراع فى الوادى, Struggle in the Valley, 1954) where she portrayed a rich man's daughter who, contrary to stereotype, was a realistic woman who helped and supported the poor. In the 1952 Mahmoud Zulfikar's production Miss Fatmah (الأستاذه فاطمه), Hamama starred as a law student who believed women were as important as men in society.

In Imbratoriyat Meem (امبراطورية ميم, The Empire M), she played the role of a widow who takes care of her large family and suffers hardship. Her most influential film was Oridu Hallan (أريد حلا, I Want a Solution) which criticized the laws of marriage and divorce in Egypt. A law in Egypt that forbade Khul' (خلع) – a divorce initiated by the wife – was annulled immediately afterwards.

== Acting style ==
Most critics agree that Hamama's most challenging role was in the 1959 film Doaa al-Karawan (دعاء الكروان, The Nightingale's Prayer), which is considered to be one of the best Egyptian films. It is based on the novel of the same name by the prominent Egyptian writer Taha Hussein. In this film, Hamama played the role of Amnah, a young woman who seeks revenge from an engineer who caused her uncle to perform an honour killing of her sister.

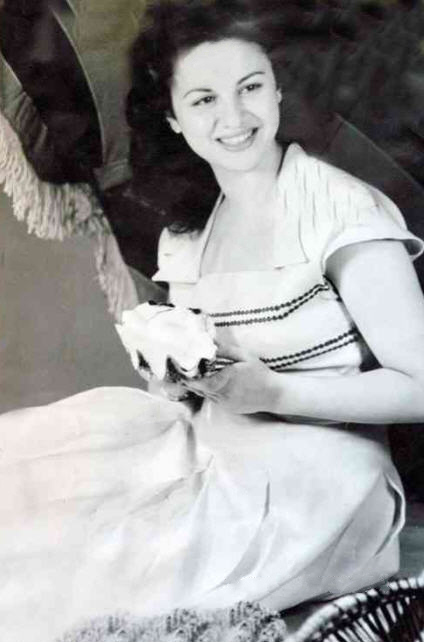
Hamama in 1950

After this film, Hamama carefully picked her roles. In 1960, she starred in the film Nahr Hob (نهر الحب, The River of Love) by Ezz El-Dine Zulficar which was based on Leo Tolstoy's well known novel Anna Karenina and in 1961, she played the lead role in the film La Tutf'e al-Shams (لا تطفئ الشمس, Don't Turn Off the Sun) based on the novel by Ihsan Abdel Quddous.

== Death and funeral ==
Faten Hamama died on 17 January 2015, aged 83. Her son Tarek Sharif did not state the cause of her death.

Tributes soon poured in from across the film industry following her death, as well as from government figures. Egyptian president Abdel Fattah el-Sisi, who was on a visit abroad, mourned her death and sent an envoy to her funeral, while a statement from his office described her as a person of "high creative value." "She will remain a symbol of the genuine Egyptian art and commitment to its ethics," the statement added. The Ministry of Culture ordered a two-day period of mourning and a halt in all artistic activity. Secretary-General of the Arab League, Nabil el-Arabi, called her a "symbol of refined Egyptian and Arab art". The country's dailies gave her prominence in their front pages, with newspaper Al-Akhbar displaying "Farewell to the Lady of the Arabic Screen" as a headline.

The funeral was attended by thousands of mourners who blocked traffic around the mosque where the ceremony was being held. The event was broadcast live on a private channel. Attendees included Minister of Culture Gaber Asfour, former presidential candidate Amr Moussa, as well as several actors and actresses, but not Omar Sharif (who was suffering from Alzheimer's disease, dying at the same age less than six months later). King Mohammed VI of Morocco assigned his country's ambassador in Cairo to attend the funeral.

== Personal life ==
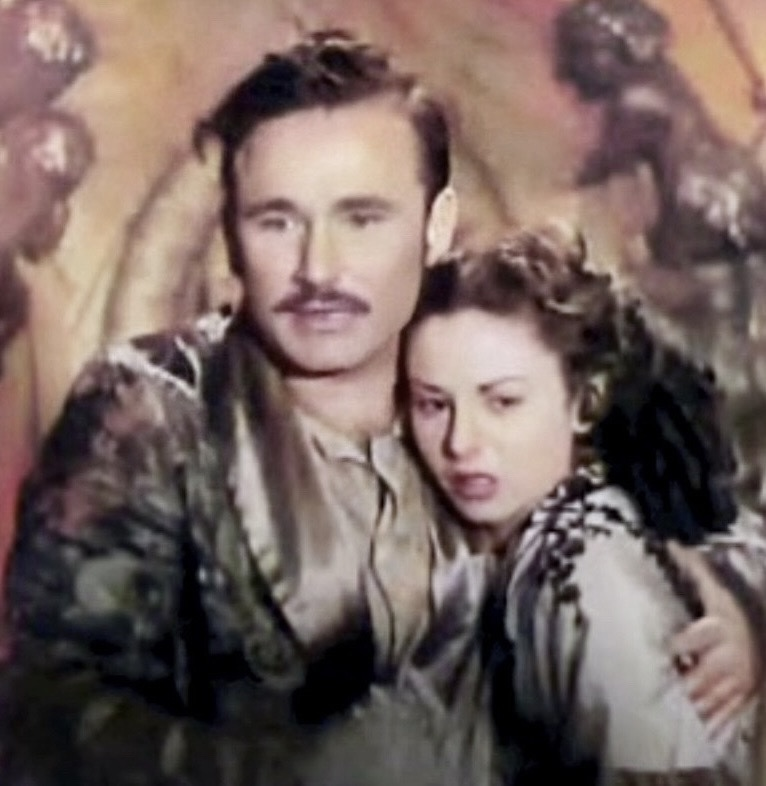
Hamama with her first husband Ezz El-Dine Zulficar in a scene from the 1948 film Khulood

While filming Abu Zayd el-Hilali (أبو زيد الهلالى) in 1947, she and director Ezz El-Dine Zulficar fell in love and wed. The marriage lasted for seven years. They divorced in 1954. Hamama has said that her love for Zulficar was little more than a student's admiration and love for a teacher. The two remained friends, and Zulficar also remarried and Hamama continued to star in his films after the divorce. They had one child, a daughter, Nadia Zulficar.

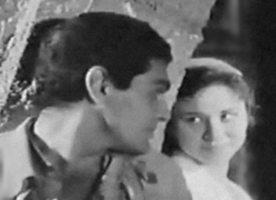
Hamama with her second husband Omar Sharif in a scene from the 1957 film Land of Peace

In 1954, Hamama chose Omar Sharif to co-star with her in a film. In this film, she uncharacteristically agreed to a romantic scene involving a kiss. During the filming, they fell in love. Sharif converted to Islam and married her. The couple co-starred in many films. However, after nearly two decades together, the couple divorced in 1974; they had one son, Tarek Sharif. The couple also have two grandsons from Tarek, Omar Sharif Jr. and Karem Sharif. Omar Sharif Jr. followed in his grandfather's footsteps and now acts in the U.S. in small roles and is an LGBTQ activist.

Hamama later married Mohamed Abdel Wahab Mahmoud, an Egyptian doctor. They resided in Cairo until her death on 17 January 2015 following a short illness.

Hamama was fluent in French, as she did an interview in French in Lebanon in 1963. She was a practicing Muslim.

== Awards, nominations and honours ==
Throughout Hamama's career, she received numerous accolades for best actress, and was nominated for the Cannes Film Festival's Prix International for her role in 1951's Your Day Will Come.

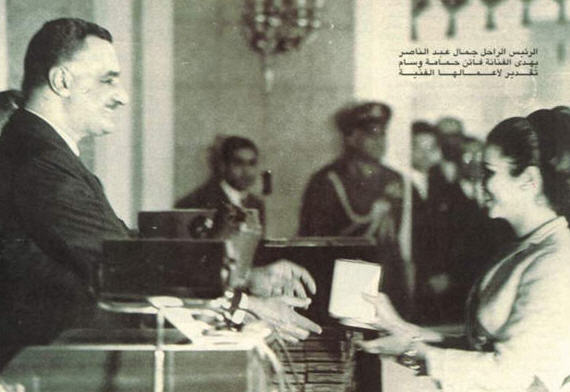
Egyptian president Gamal Abdel Nasser awarding Faten Hamama the Order of the Republic, 1965.

She received her first award in 1951 for her role in I'm the Past, which was presented to her by different venues, including the Egyptian Catholic Center for Cinema Festival. The country's Ministry of Guidance also awarded her the title of Best Actress in both 1955 and 1961. These were followed by many different awards for best actress from various national and international events. International ones included special awards at the first Tehran International Film Festival in 1972 for her role in The Thin Thread, and again at the 1977 Tehran Film Festival for her role in Mouths and Rabbits. In 1973, she received the Special Award at the Moscow International Film Festival for her role in Empire M (1972). Hamama's other international accolades included the Best Actress awards at the Jakarta International Film Festival in 1963 for her role in The Open Door, and at the Carthage Film Festival in 1988 for her role in Bitter Days, Nice Days.

Hamama was also a recipient of the Lebanese Order of Merit in 1984 for her role in The Night of Fatma's Arrest. She was later presented lifetime achievement awards, including one at the Montpellier Mediterranean Film Festival in 1993, and another at the Dubai International Film Festival in 2009. In 2001, the Egyptian Writers and Critics Organization chose her as "Star of the Century" at the Alexandria International Film Festival, honouring her lengthy career in Egyptian cinema.

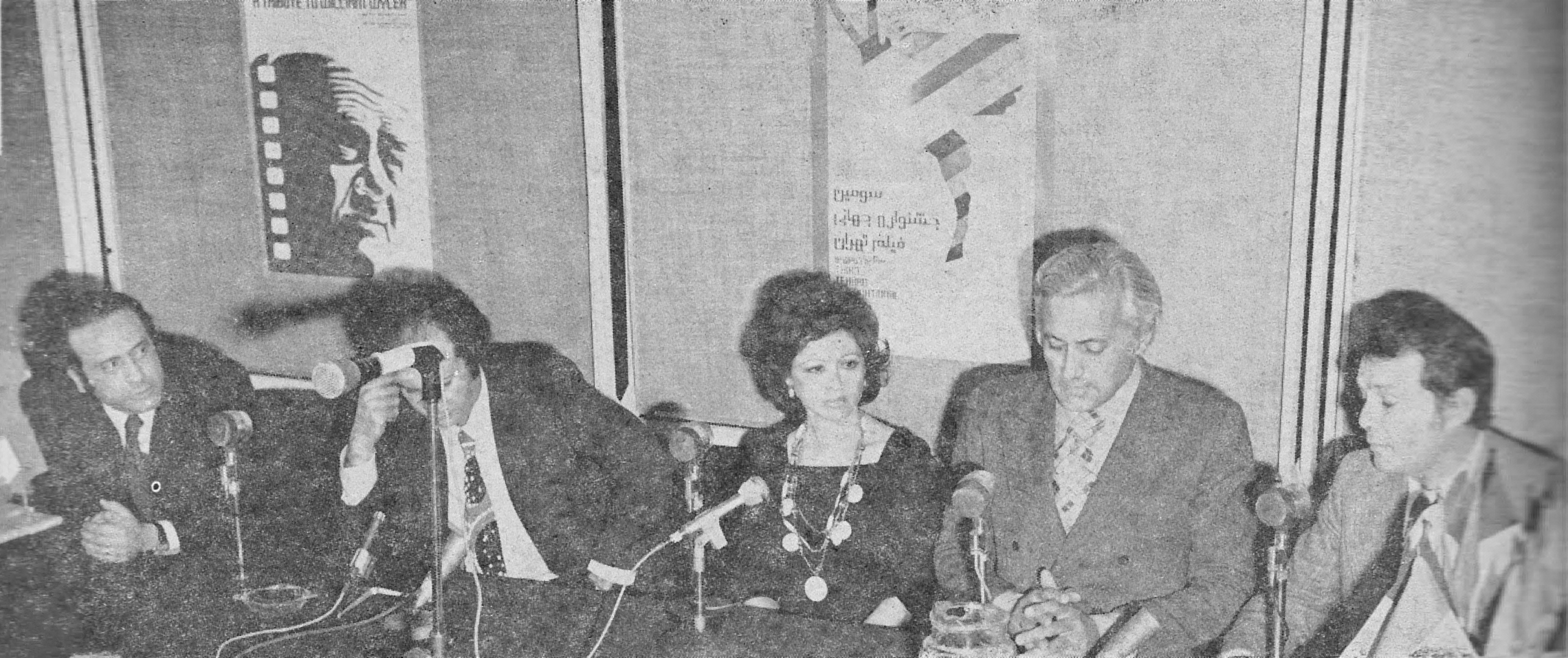
I Want a Solution Press conference for the third Tehran International Film Festival. From right to left: Salah Zulfikar (Producer of I Want a Solution), Manuchehr Anwar, Faten Hamama, Said Mazrouk, Egyptian translator (1974).

Hamama was also honoured on several other occasions. Some of those include:

- Decoration of Creativity of First Degree, from Lebanese Prime Minister Prince Khaled Chehab (1953)
- Order of the Republic of First Degree for Art, from Egyptian President Gamal Abdel Nasser (1965)
- Decoration of the State of the First Order, from Egyptian President Anwar Sadat (1976)
- Decoration of the Cedar, from Lebanese President Émile Lahoud (2001)
- Decoration of Intellectual Competence, from King Mohammed VI of Morocco (2001)
- On 14 June 2013, the American University of Beirut awarded Faten Hamama with an honorary doctorate. The University President Peter Dorman introduced the Egyptian actress as an "icon, legend, and luminary." However, "I feel a great happiness, today, greater than any gift that I have ever received. Currently, there is a massive attack on art, culture and anything related to literature. So this honorary doctorate will not only make me happy, but will bring happiness to all the artists and cultured people in Egypt and the Arab world." said Hamama.
- Order of Sciences and Arts, 2014
- A Google Doodle on 27 May 2016 commemorated Hamama's 85th birth anniversary.

== Selected filmography ==
=== Film ===
Year	International title	Arabic title	Role
1939	Happy Day	Yom Sa'id, يوم سعيد	Anisa
1944	Bullet in the Heart	Rosasa fi el Alb, رصاصه فى القلب	Nagwa
1946	Angel of Mercy	Malak el-Rahma, ملاك الرحمه	Thoraya
1947	Abu Zayd al-Hilali	Abu Zed el-Helali, أبو زيد الهلالى	Caliph's daughter
1948	The Small Millionaire	El-Millionerah el-Soghayyarah, المليونيره الصغيره	Pilot's girlfriend
1948	Immortality	Khulood, خلود	Laila / Amal
1948	The Two Orphans	El-Yatimaten, اليتيمتين	Ne'mat
1948	Towards Glory	Nahw el-Magd, نحو المجد	Soher
1949	Chair of Confession	Korsi el-E'teraf, كرسى الاعتراف	Phileberta
1949	Lady of the House	Sett el-Bet, ست البيت	Elham
1949	Every House Has a Man	Koll Bet Loh Ragel, كلّ بيت له راجل	Faten
1950	Virtue for Sale	Akhlaq Lel Be' , أخلاق للبيع	Amina
1951	Son of the Nile	Ebn el-Nile, ابن النيل	Zebeda
1951	Your Day Will Come	Lak Yom Ya Zalem, لك يوم يا ظالم	Ne'mat
1951	I'm The Past	Ana el-Madi, أنا الماضى	Elham's daughter
1952	House Number 13	El-Manzel Raqam 13, المنزل رقم 13	Nadia
1952	Immortal Song	Lahn el-Kholud, لحن الخلود	Wafa'
1952	Miss Fatimah	El-Ostazah Fatmah, الأستاذه فاطمه	Fatmah
1953	A'isha	'Esha, عيشه	'Esha
1953	Date with Life	Maw'ed Ma' al-Hayat, موعد مع الحياة	Amal
1954	Pity My Tears	Irham Dmoo'i, ارحم دموعى	Amal
1954	Traces in the Sand	Athar Fi el-Remal, أثار فى الرمال	Ragia
1954	The Unjust Angel	El-Malak el-Zalem, الملاك الظالم	Nadia
1954	Always with You	Dayman Ma'ak, دايما معاك	Tefida
1954	Date with Happiness	Maw'ed Ma'a el-Sa'adah, موعد مع السعاده	Ehsan / Amal
1954	Struggle in the Valley	Sera' Fi el-Wadi,صراع فى الوادى	Amal
1955	Our Beautiful Days	Ayyamna el-Helwa, أيامنا الحلوه	Hoda
1955	Love and Tears	Hobb W Demu' , حب و دموع	Fatimah
1956	Love Date	Maw'ed Gharam, موعد غرام	Nawal
1956	Struggle in the Pier	Sira' Fi al-Mina, صراع فى الميناء	Hameedah
1957	Road of Hope	Tariq el-Amal, طريق الأمل	Faten
1957	Land of Peace	Ard el-Salam, أرض السلام	Salma
1957	Sleepless	La Anam, لا أنام	Nadia Lotfi
1958	The Barred Road	El-Tari' el-Masdud, الطريق المسدود	Fayza
1958	The Virgin Wife	El-Zogah el-Azra', الزوجه العذراء	Mona
1958	Lady of the Castle	Sayyidat al-Qasr, سيدة القصر	Sawsan
1959	Among the Ruins	Ben el-Atlal, بين الأطلال	Mona
1959	The Nightingale's Prayer	Do'a el-Karawan, دعاء الكروان	Amnah
1960	River of Love	Nahr el-Hobb, نهر الحب	Nawal
1961	I Will Not Confess	Lan A'tref, لن أعترف	Amal
1961	Don't Set the Sun Off	La Totfe' el-Shams, لا تطفئ الشمس	Layla
1962	The Miracle	El-Mo'geza, المعجزه	Layla
1963	Cairo (USA)	Cairo	Amina
1963	No Time For Love	La Waqt Lil Hob, لا وقت للحب	Fawziyah
1963	The Open Door	El-Bab el-Maftooh, الباب المفتوح	Laila
1963	The Last Night	El-Lela el-Akhira , الليله الأخيره	Nadia / Fawziyya
1965	The Sin	El-Haram, الحرام	Azizah
1965	Story of a Lifetime	Hikayet al-'Omr Kolloh, حكاية العمر كلّه	Nadia
1965	The Confession	El-E'treaf, الاعتراف	Nawal
1966	Something in My Life	Shai' Fi Hayati, شىء فى حياتى	A'ida
1970	The Great Love	El-Hobb el-Kabir, الحب الكبير	Hanan
1971	Witch	Sahera, ساحره	So'ad
1971	The Thin Thread	El-Khet el-Rofayya' , الخيط الرفيع	Mona
1972	M Empire	Imbratoriyat Meem, امبراطورية ميم	Mona
1974	My Love	Habibati, حبيبتى	Samia
1974	I Need a Solution	Oridu Hallan, أريدُ حلاً	Fawziyah
1977	Mouths and Rabbits	Afwah wa Araneb, أفواه و أرانب	Ne'mat
1979	No Condolences for Ladies	Wa La 'Aza' Lel Sayyidat, و لا عزاء للسيدات	Rawya
1985	The Night of Fatima's Arrest	Lelet el-Abd 'ala Fatmah, ليلة القبض على فاطمه	Fatimah
1988	Sweet Days.. Bitter Days	Yom Morr Yom Helw, يوم مر.. يوم حلو	Esha
1993	Land of Dreams	Ard el-Ahlam, أرض الأحلام	Narges

=== Television ===
Year	Title	Arabic	Role
1991	Miss Hekmat's Conscience (mini-series)	Damir Ablah Hekmat, ضمير أبله حكمت	Hekmat
2000	Face of the Moon (mini-series)	Wagh el-Amar, وجه القمر	Ebtesam el-Bostani

== See also ==
- Bahiga Hafez
- Fatima Rushdi
- Nadia Lutfi
- Lists of Egyptians
- Egyptian films of the 1950s
- Egyptian films of the 1960s

== Sources ==
=== Published sources ===
- Ayoub-Geday, Paul (2002). Egypt Almanac 2002–2003: The Encyclopedia of Modern Egypt. American University in Cairo Press. ISBN 977-5893-02-X.
- Darwish, Mustafa (1998). Dream Makers on the Nile: A Portrait of Egyptian Cinema. Columbia University Press. ISBN 977-424-429-X.
- Farid, Samir (1995). Faten Hamama. Egyptian Cultural Development Fund. ISBN 977-235-329-6.
- Karnouk, Liliane (June 2005) [2003]. Modern Egyptian Art:1910–2003. American University in Cairo Press. ISBN 977-424-859-7.

=== Online sources ===
- El Abnoudi, Abdel Rahman (2001). "The Star of all Stars".
- El Sabban, Rafik (2001). "Faten... The Legend".
- El Shenawy, Tarek (2001). "The Star of the Century".
- Ma'ati, Yousef (2000). "Voice of the Moon".
- Wahba, Saad El Din (1995). "Faten Hamama ... A National Wealth!".
