= Every House has its Man =

1949 film

Kul Bayt Lahu Rajel كل بيت له رجل
- Faten Hamama
- Directed by: Ahmed Kamel Morsi
- Written by: Magdi Farid; Ahmed Kamel Morsi
- Produced by: Magdi Farid
- Starring: Faten Hamama; Mahmoud El Meliguy; Amina Rizk
- Cinematography: Umberto Lanzano
- Release date: 1949
- Country: Egypt
- Language: Arabic

Kul Bayt Lahu Rajel (Arabic: كل بيت له راجل, Every House Has Its Man) is a 1949 Egyptian drama film. It starred Abdel Alim Khattab, Faten Hamama, Mahmoud El Meliguy, and Amina Rizk. The film was directed by Ahmed Morsi.

The film is about a man who dies leaving behind a widow and her daughter. One day, the mother meets a man, who she later falls in love with. Her daughter also loves him, and is devastated after discovering that she left her boyfriend for a man who is having a relationship with her mother.

== Cast ==
- Faten Hamama as Faten
- Mahmoud El-Meliguy as Amin
- Amina Rizk as the Mother
- Abdel Alim Khattab
