= Dunia (1946 film) =

1946 film

- Directed by: Mohammed Karim
- Written by: Mohammed Karim
- Starring: Dawlad Abiad
- Cinematography: M. Abdelazim
- Release date: 1946
- Country: Egypt
- Language: Arabic

Dunia is a 1946 Egyptian film directed by Mohammed Karim. It was entered into the 1946 Cannes Film Festival.

== Cast ==
- Dawlad Abiad
- Faten Hamama
- Raqiya Ibrahim
- Suleiman Naguib (as Soliman Bey Naguib)
- Ahmed Salem
