= Salah Zulfikar Films Company =

Egyptian film production company

ِSalah Zulfikar Films
- Trade name: ِSalah Zulfikar Films
- Native name: شركة أفلام صلاح ذو الفقار
- Type: Private sector
- Industry: Film
- Founded: 1962
- Founder: Salah Zulfikar
- Defunct: 1978
- Headquarters: 37 Emad El-Din street, Downtown Cairo, Cairo, Egypt
- Area served: Middle East • North Africa
- Key people: Salah Zulfikar
- Products: Motion pictures
- Services: Filmmaking
- Owner: Salah Zulfikar

Salah Zulfikar Films Company (Arabic: شركة أفلام صلاح ذو الفقار, aka: Salah Zulfikar Films) is a film production company established in 1962 in Cairo, Egypt. It operated in the Middle East and North Africa since 1962 until 1978.

== History ==
Salah Zulfikar Films Company was established by Salah Zulfikar (1926–1993), It was created to produce feature films. Their goal was to focus on film sales, but as the founder stated in a 1969 television interview, aired on Channel 1 of the Egyptian television "I am a professional cinematic actor, however, I consider film production as my hobby, I produce what I believe".

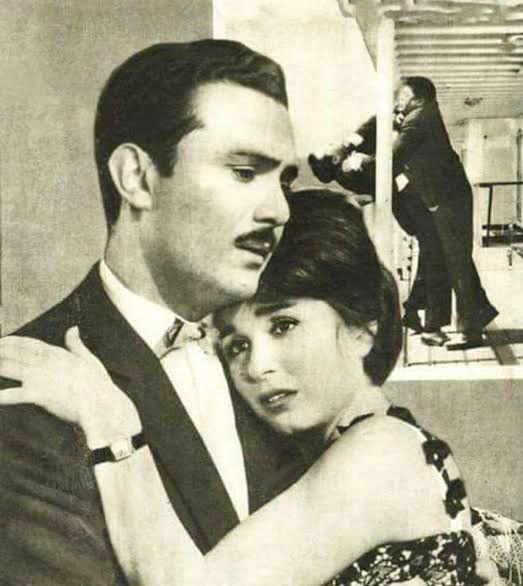
Publicity still of actor Salah Zulfikar and actress Soad Hosny in A Date at the Tower (1962), Salah Zulfikar Films' first venture.

Their goal was to focus on film sales, with their first venture being Ezz El-Dine Zulficar's A Date at the Tower (1962), signing Soad Hosny; the rising female movie star at the time opposite Salah Zulfikar. The film made high numbers and was a financial success for the newly born company.

Zulfikar succeeded to sign with Farid Shawqi who was a bankable star in the 50s and 60s to star in their second film; I’m the Fugitive (1962) and it was a box office hit. Followed by another box office hit; A Letter from Unknown Woman (1962) with Farid al-Atrash and Lobna Abdel Aziz in the leading roles. With those three films in just the first year of operations, it was considered a great start. Zulfikar, the company's founder who was a famous leading actor himself, had no difficulty in convincing Egypt's movie stars to sign one after another.

In 1966, Salah Zulfikar Films produced My Wife, the Director General (1966). The film did justice to the main female character and allowed her to be a director over men. It was a huge commercial and critical success for Zulfikar himself as the lead actor and the film production company's owner. Three years later, the company produced A Taste of Fear (1969), starring Shadia, who was Zulfikar's wife at the time. It was one of the highest grossing films of the year and the film was a masterpiece and became an Egyptian cinematic classic. After producing films in Syria and Lebanon, the company produced I Want a Solution (1975), an award winning film starring Faten Hamama and Rushdy Abaza, grossing numbers in the Arab world. The film contributed in changing the personal status law in Egypt at the time in favor of women.

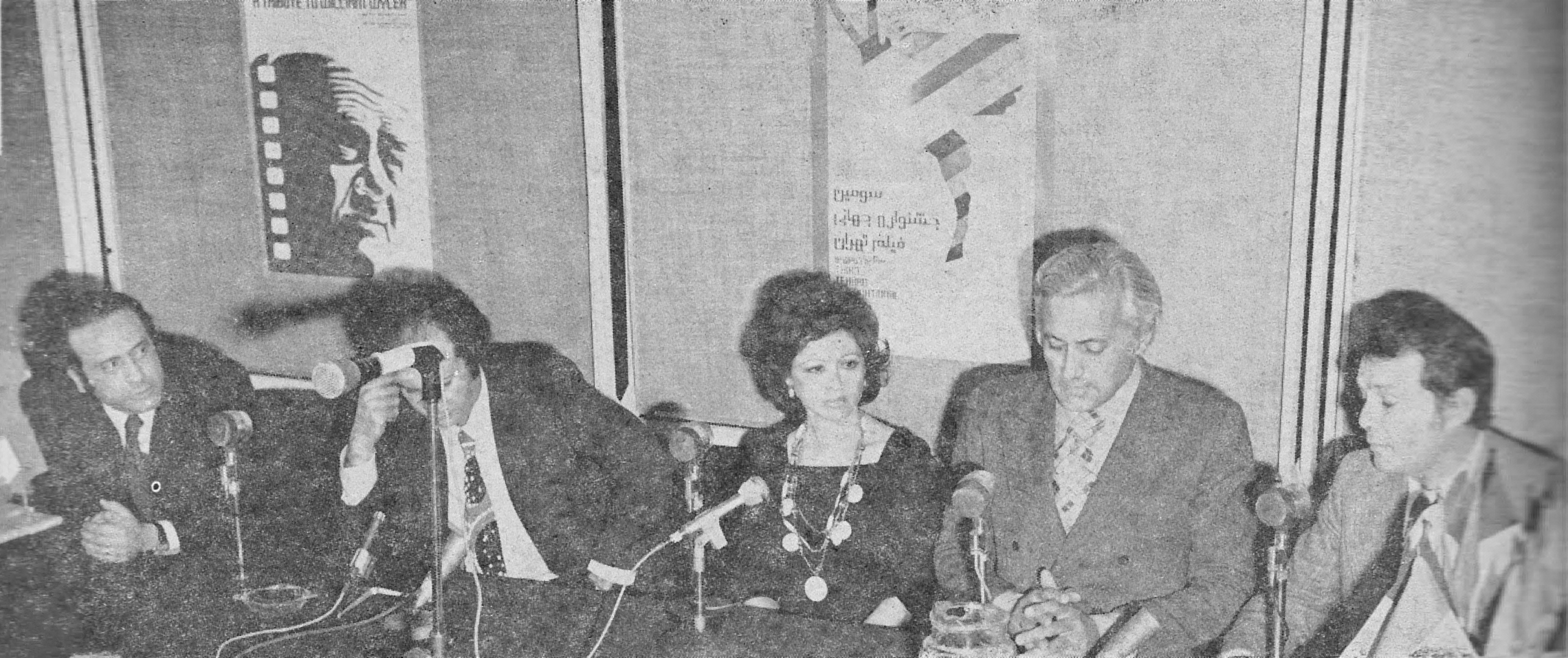
Salah Zulfikar (right) attending an I Want a Solution (1975) press conference for the third Tehran International Film Festival. From right to left: Zulfikar (on behalf of Salah Zulfikar Films), Manuchehr Anwar, Faten Hamama, Said Mazrouk, and Egyptian translator, 1974.

The company operated for almost 16 years with a film production portfolio of 10 films and two TV shorts through the 1960s and 1970s. Due to major alteration in Egyptian Cinema starting from mid 1970s, Zulfikar stated that he's considering retirement from the film production career and concentrate only on his acting career.

Despite the box office success in almost all films produced by Salah Zulfikar Films. The company went defunct in 1978, leaving behind a huge legacy and missing Salah Zulfikar's dream to produce a war film showing Egyptian patriotic and heroic roles towards his country. In 1996, for the centenary of Egyptian cinema, three Salah Zulfikar films were listed among the top hundred Egyptian films of the 20th century.

== Founder ==
Salah Zulfikar (1926–1993) was an Egyptian actor and film producer. He started his career as a police officer in the Egyptian National Police, before becoming an actor in 1956. He is regarded as one of the most influential actors in the history of Egyptian film industry. Zulfikar had roles in more than hundred feature films in multiple genres during a 37-year career, mostly as the leading actor.

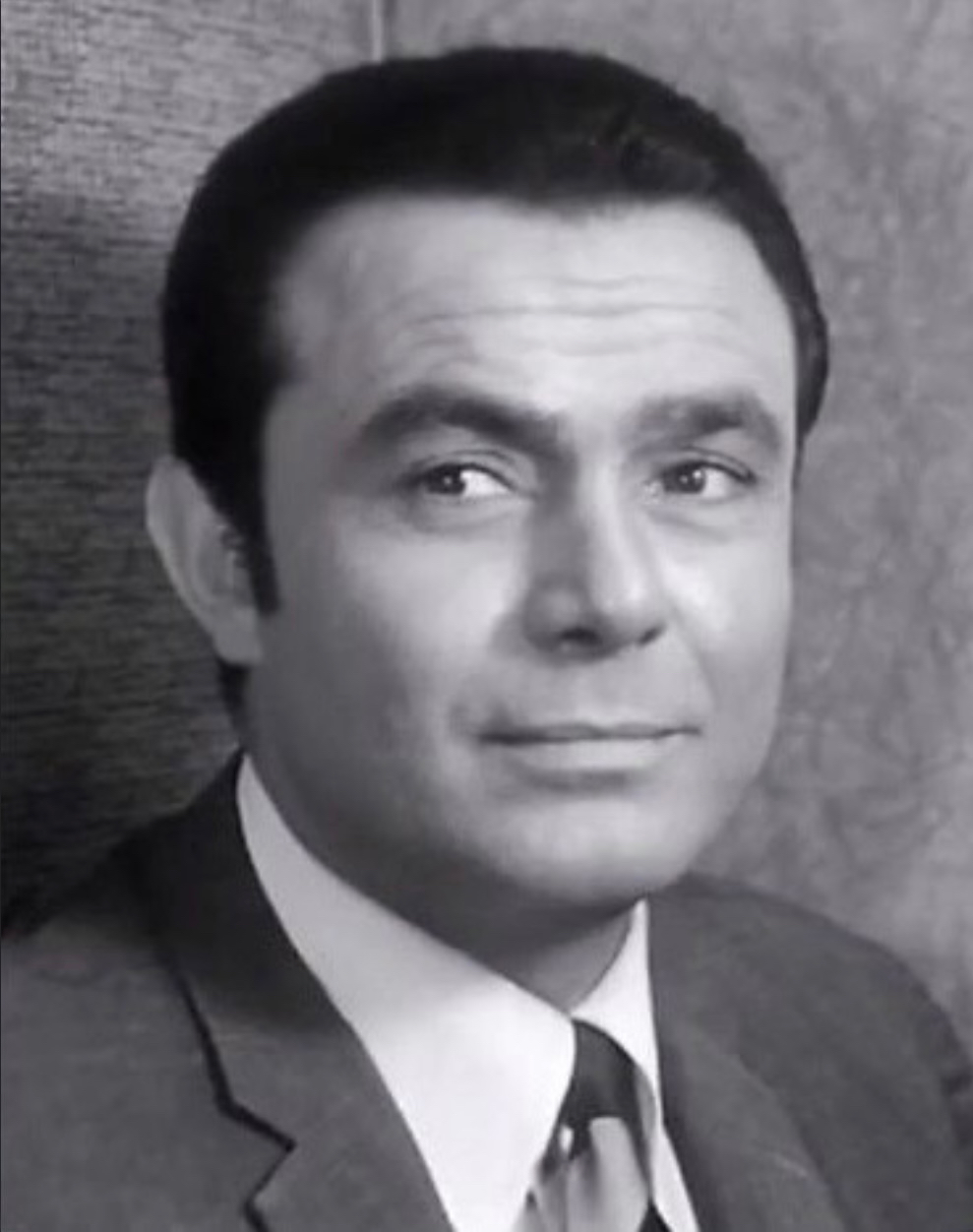
Salah Zulfikar

Zulfikar established his first film production corporation with elder brother Ezz El-Dine Zulficar in 1958. He ran his new business under the trade name of Ezz El-Dine Zulficar Films. In 1962, he founded Salah Zulfikar Films company and operated in Egypt and Arab world for almost 16 years. Through Zulfikar's two productions corporations he ran in his 20-year career as a film producer, he won numerous awards and 5 of his productions were listed in the Top 100 Egyptian films of the 20th century.

== Films ==
=== Feature films ===
| Year | English title | Original title | Note(s) |
|---|---|---|---|
| 1962 | A Date at the Tower | Maww'ed Fil-Borg موعد في البرج | First production |
| 1962 | Letter from an Unknown Woman | Ressalah men Imraa Maghoula رسالة من امرأة مجهولة | |
| 1962 | I am the Fugitive | Ana El Hareb أنا الهارب | |
| 1966 | My Wife, the Director General | Mirati Modeer Aam مراتي مدير عام | Best Producer Award of 1966 from Ministry of Culture, Best Picture in Egyptian Catholic Center Festival, 1966 |
| 1966 | Three Thieves | 3 Losoos ٣ لصوص | |
| 1969 | A Taste of Fear | Shey min El Khouf شئ من الخوف | Best Picture in Egyptian Catholic Center Festival, 1969 |
| 1972 | A Journey of Suffering | Rihlat Azab رحلة عذاب | |
| 1973 | The Other Man | Al Ragol Al Akhar الرجل الآخر | |
| 1975 | I Want a Solution | Orid Hallan أريد حلًا | Best Producer Award of 1975 from Ministry of Culture |

=== TV shorts ===
| Year | English title | Original title | Note(s) |
|---|---|---|---|
| 1973 | I Want This Man (TV short film) | Oreedo Hatha Al-Rajul أريد هذا الرجل | Executive |
| 1973 | Death Song (TV short film) | Oghneyat El Moot أغنية الموت | Executive |

== See also ==
- Egyptian cinema
- Lists of Egyptian films
