= Lady of the House (1949 film) =

1949 film

Sitt al-Bayt
- Poster
- Directed by: Ahmed Kamel Morsi
- Written by: Abo El Seoud El Ebiary
- Starring: Faten Hamama; Emad Hamdy; Zeinab Sedky
- Release date: 1949
- Country: Egypt
- Language: Arabic

Sitt al-Bayt (Arabic: ست البيت, Lady of the House) is a 1949 Egyptian drama film. It starred Faten Hamama, Emad Hamdy, and Zeinab Sedky. The film, which was written by Abo El Seoud El Ebiary and directed by Ahmed Morsi, was nominated for the Prix International Award in the Cannes International Film Festival.

== Plot ==
Elham (Faten Hamama) marries Nabil (Emad Hamdy) and moves with him to his mother's house, which is where problems arise between Elham and her mother-in-law. Nabil's mother believes Elham is an intruder to her personal life because she is more the "lady of the house" than she was. The hatred forces Nabil's mother to try to convince her son to marry another woman, Madiha (Mona), especially after discovering that Elham might be sterile.

Elham decides to leave the house, but as she was leaving she trips while going down the stairs and is rushed to the hospital. Her doctor tells Nabil that Elham was actually pregnant when she fell, and that she had miscarried as a result. Nabil is devastated and blames his mother for the result. The mother recognizes the mistakes she has made and apologizes to Elham and asks for forgiveness.

== Cast ==
- Faten Hamama as Elham
- Emad Hamdy as Nabil
- Zeinab Sedky as Nabil's mother
- Mona as Madiha
- Mohammed Kamel
- Thuraya Fakhri
