= Empire M =

1972 film

- Directed by: Hussein Kamal
- Written by: Ihsan Abd al-Qudus; Mustafa Samy
- Produced by: Murad Ramsis Nagib
- Starring: Faten Hamama
- Cinematography: Wahid Farid
- Release date: 1972
- Country: Egypt
- Language: Arabic

Empire M (Arabic: إمبراطورية ميم, translit. Emberatoriet meem) is a 1972 Egyptian drama film directed by Hussein Kamal. The film was entered into the 8th Moscow International Film Festival in 1973. It was also selected as the Egyptian entry for the Best Foreign Language Film at the 46th Academy Awards, but was not accepted as a nominee. The film was remade in a Turkish as Benim Altı Sevgilim in 1977.

== Cast ==
- Faten Hamama as Mother (Mona)
- Ahmed Mazhar
- Dawlad Abiad as Granny
- Seif Abol Naga as Mostafa (as Khaled Abol Naga)
- Hesham Selim as Son
- Hayat Kandeel as Daughter

== See also ==
- List of submissions to the 46th Academy Awards for Best Foreign Language Film
- List of Egyptian submissions for the Academy Award for Best Foreign Language Film
