= Your Day Will Come =

Lak Yawm Ya Zalem
- Directed by: Salah Abouseif
- Starring: Faten Hamama; Mahmoud El-Meliguy; Mohammed Tawfik; Mohsen Sarhan
- Release date: 1951
- Country: Egypt
- Language: Arabic

Your Day Will Come (Arabic: لك يوم يا ظالم, Lak Yawm Ya Zalem; sometimes referred to in English as Your Day Is Coming) is a classic 1951 Egyptian crime thriller film directed by Salah Abouseif. It starred Faten Hamama, Mahmoud el-Meliguy, Mohammed Tawfik and Mohsen Sarhan and was chosen as one of the best 150 Egyptian film productions in 1996, during the Egyptian Cinema centennial. The film was presented in the Berlin International Film Festival.

The film is inspired by Zola's novel Thérèse Raquin.

== Plot ==
A greedy man betrays his friend and falls in love with his wife, who is a rich lady. He kills him and marries the widow. He steals her money and jewelry and mistreats her. He is then arrested by the police and receives his punishment.

== Cast ==
- Mohammad Tawfik
- Faten Hamama
- Mahmoud Al Meleji
- Muhsen Sarhan
