= Lady of the Palace (film) =

1958 film

Sayyidat al-Qasr
- Sawsan (Faten Hamama) and Adel (Omar Sharif) in Sayyidat al-Qasr
- Directed by: Kamal El Sheikh
- Written by: Hussein Helmy Almohandes
- Produced by: Hassan Ramzi
- Starring: Faten Hamama; Omar Sharif
- Cinematography: Abdelhalim Nasr
- Release date: November 17, 1958
- Country: Egypt
- Language: Arabic

Sayyidat al-Qasr (Arabic: سيدة القصر, English: Lady of the Palace) is a 1958 Egyptian romance film starring Faten Hamama and Omar Sharif. The film is directed by the Egyptian film director Kamal El Sheikh and written by Hussein Helmy Almohandes.

== Plot ==
Faten Hamama plays Sawsan, a middle-class orphan who meets Adel (Omar Sharif), a rich man, at an auction hall. He tries to approach her, but she refuses him. Eventually, he marries her. His playboy friends, Shafeek and Malak (among others), feel uncomfortable with Sawsan being around, as she condemns the style of life that they lead, and therefore Adel orders her to stay at home. While staying alone at home, Sawsan works on some land Adel owns, with the help of one of Adel's old friends, Mustafa (Omar El-Hariri). Adel's playboy friends try to destroy Adel's marriage by telling him that Sawsan is having an affair with his friend, Mustafa. Adel's friends try to exploit Adel for his fortunes and convince him to sell his land. Mustafa talks to Adel and convinces him not to sell his land to his exploiter friends. Adel realizes his mistake, expels his friends, and returns to his wife.

== Cast ==
- Faten Hamama as Sawsan
- Omar Sharif as Adel
- Zouzou Mady as Malak hanem
- Stephan Rosti as Shafeek
- Ferdoos Mohammed as the mother
- Omar El-Hariri as Mustafa
