= Happy Day (film) =

Yawm Said
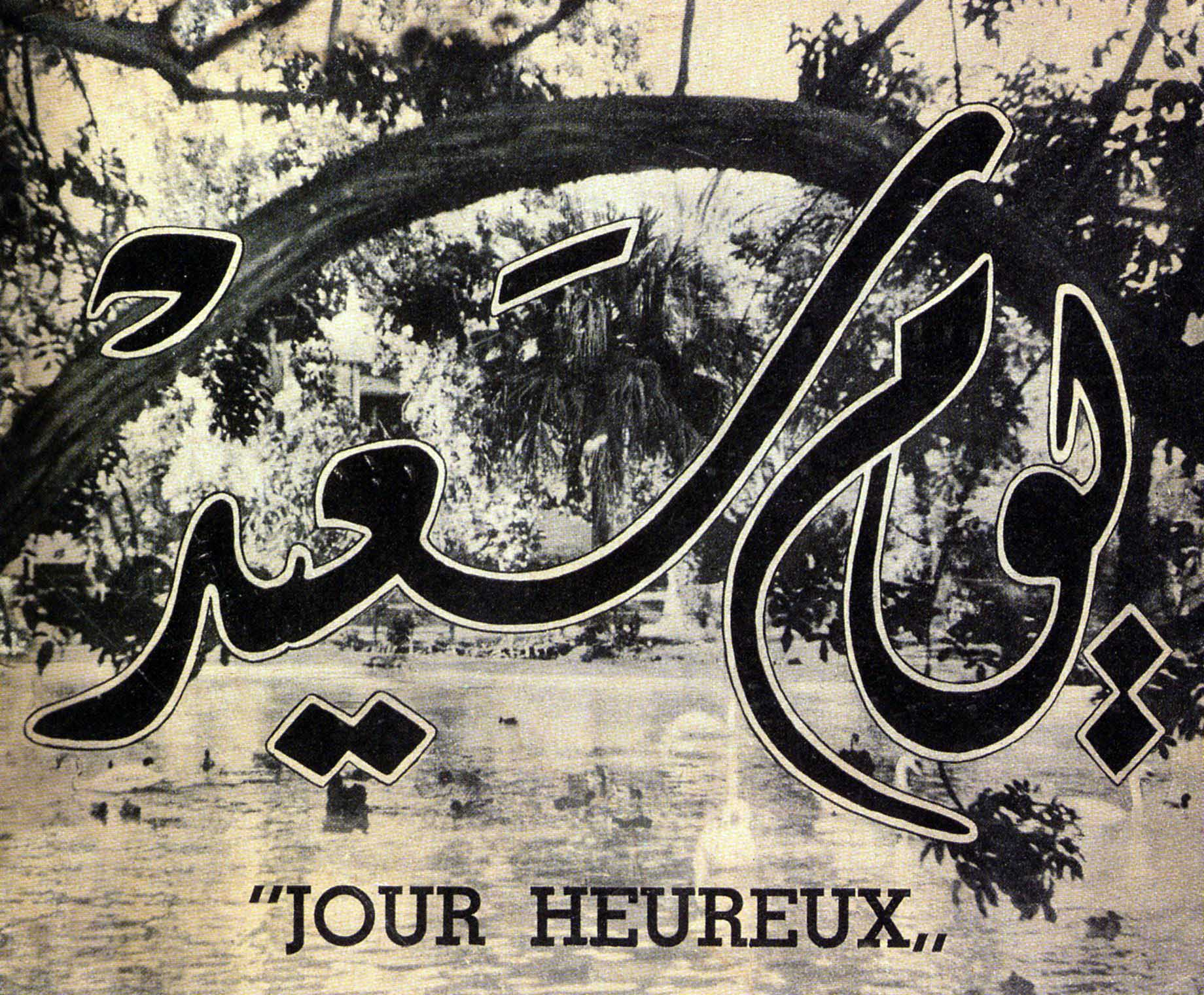
- Movie poster
- Directed by: Mohammed Karim
- Produced by: Mohammed Karim
- Starring: Faten Hamama; Samiha Samih; Mohamed Abdel Wahab
- Release date: 1939 (Egypt)
- Country: Egypt
- Language: Arabic

Yawm Sa'id (Arabic: يوم سعيد, Happy Day) is a 1939 Egyptian drama film directed by Mohammed Karim and starring Egyptian actor and musician Mohamed Abdel Wahab. This was also the first movie that Faten Hamama, who was only eight years old then, acted in.

== Plot ==
Abdel Wahab plays the role of a young man who is unlucky to be fired from his job. He meets a beautiful lady and falls in love with her. The lady's parents do not approve of the man. The young man earns a good reputation and becomes famous and a rich lady, secretly having a crush for him, asks him for music lessons, only to get closer to him. The rich lady discovers that he is in love with another woman and tries to ruin their relationship, but fails and the lovers remain together. After what happens, the lady's parents are convinced of the man's loyalty and love so they accept him as her husband.

== Cast ==
- Mohamed Abdel Wahab
- Faten Hamama
- Samiha Samih
