= The Unjust Angel =

- The Unjust Angel poster
- Directed by: Hassan el-Imam
- Written by: Ali El Zorkani
- Produced by: Amir Film
- Starring: Faten Hamama; Kamal Al-Shennawi; Seraj Munir; Mahmoud el-Meliguy; Hind Rostom
- Release date: 1954
- Country: Egypt
- Language: Arabic

The Unjust Angel (Arabic: الملاك الظالم, translit. Al-Malak al-Zalem) is a 1954 Egyptian crime/drama film directed by Hassan el-Imam. It starred Kamal Al-Shennawi, Seraj Munir, Faten Hamama, and Mahmoud el-Meliguy.

== Plot ==
Nadia's (Faten Hamama) father is prisoned for a murder crime he didn't commit. His lawyer fails to get him out of jail, and decides to raise his daughter. Years later, after Nadia has finished her school education, she enters college, where she is assigned to do a research on prisoners and their social effect. In prison, she meets a prisoner who claims to be her father. At first she doesn't believe him, but after checking his documents and ID, she discovers that he's not lying, that he is actually her real father.

She, with the help of her fiancé, played by Kamal Al-Shennawi, seek to free him and prove his innocence. Through their research and after obtaining evidence from old newspapers, they discover that the murderer was not the father, but instead another man (Mahmoud El-Meliguy), who has conspired against the father. In court, the father is proved to be innocent, and the true murderer is jailed. Nadia then marries her love.
