= Liliane Karnouk =

Egyptian artist and author (born 1944)

- Born: Egypt
- Education: University of British Columbia
- Occupation: fine art

Liliane Karnouk (born 12 November 1944) is an Egyptian-Canadian artist and author based in Vancouver, Canada.

== Biography ==
Karnouk was born in Cairo, Egypt. She is a graduate of the Academy of Fine Arts in Rome, Italy, the Université du Quebec à Montreal, Canada, and the University of British Columbia, Canada where she acquired an M.A in art and communications (1971). Though Karnouk lives in Vancouver, her art has been exhibited across Canada, Egypt, Germany, Italy, France and the United States. Returning temporarily to Egypt in 1980, Karnouk founded an art program at the American University in Cairo, Egypt.

== Background ==
Karnouk is a multi-lingual Egyptian Canadian, growing up middle class in Cairo as the eldest of three siblings.

== Artworks ==
Karnouk's art pieces and installations utilize several non-traditional techniques, including mixed media and collages in her 1981 piece "Untitled". She also employed macropropagation in her 1994 exhibition "Time Machine" at the British Museum in London, England, placing cemetery railings around the granite sarcophagus of Nesisut with test tubes of the macropropagated plants strung along the railings. The National Gallery of Canada granted her a fellowship in art and science (1996) for her work "Time Machine".

== Books published ==
- Liminal Country: A Novel (2018)
- The Shatranj Web (2013)
- Modern Egyptian Art: 1910–2003 (2005)
- Contemporary Egyptian Art (1995)
