= Farid Shawqi =

Egyptian actor, screenwriter, and film producer

- فريد شوقي
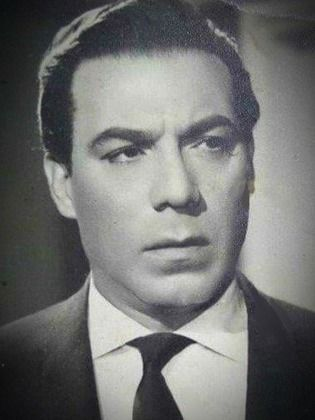
- Born: July 30, 1920; El Sayyeda Zainab, Cairo, Sultanate of Egypt
- Died: July 27, 1998 (aged 77); Maadi, Cairo, Egypt
- Other names: "The Screen Monster"; "The King of the Third Class"; "The Giant"; Abu Ali; Abu el-Banat
- Occupations: Actor; screenwriter; film producer
- Years active: 1946–1996
- Height: 6 ft 1.5 in (1.87 m)
- Spouses: Zainab Abdel Hadi (m. 1941; div. 1945) Sania Shawqi (m. 1945; div. 1950) Huda Sultan (m. 1951; div. 1969) Soheir Turk (m. 1970)
- Children: 5, including Rania
- Relatives: Nahed El Sebai (granddaughter)

Farid Shawqi Mohammad Abdou Shawqi (Arabic: فريد شوقي محمد عبده شوقي; July 30, 1920 – July 27, 1998) was an Egyptian actor, screenwriter and film producer. He acted in 351 films, 27 plays and 17 television series; wrote 25 film scripts and produced 30 films. He is considered to be one of the greatest actors in the Middle East.

He was also known as "Malek El Terso" ("The King of the Third Class" – a reference to his popularity among the poor, who bought third-class seats in movie theatres), as "Wahsh ash-Shashah al-Arabiyah" ("The Monster of the Arab Silver Screen" – in honor of his various roles of beloved hero, as "Farid Bay" ("Sir Farid", an informal title of respect), as "Abu el-Banat" ("Father of All Girls", a reference to his having five daughters and no sons), and other names. ُُ The closet title to Farid Shawqi's heart was "The King"; he was named this after his movie Night's Devils that was released in 1966, directed by Niazi Mostafa. He was known as "The King" among his colleagues.

== Career ==
In a career spanning almost 50 years, Shawqi starred, produced, or wrote the scenario of over 400 films - more than the films produced collectively by the whole Arab world - in addition to theatre, television and video plays. His popularity covered the whole of the Arab World and the Middle East, including Turkey where he acted in some films there, and directors always addressed his as ' Farid Bay' (Sir Farid) as a sign of respect. As he worked with over 90 Film directors and producers.

For the first ten years he typically cast as a villain. By the late 1940s his name alongside that of the late Mahmoud El-Meliguy guaranteed a box-office success. In 1954 he changed that image forever, playing the leading role in Ga'aloony Mujriman ("They Made Me a Criminal"), his own script in which he tackled the problem of homeless children and the first crime thus exposing the failure of government policy and the corruption of state run orphanages and young offenders institutions.

Disliked by the establishment, the film was later awarded the State Prize; Shawqi went on to collect 10 best actor awards in many festivals, and four other awards for his scripts in the next thirty years.

Critics referred to him as the "John Wayne" or "Anthony Quinn" of Egyptian cinema and of the Arabic speaking World", and to the masses he was the Beast of the Silver Screen, who championed the underdog, especially women, and the dispossessed using an effective mixture of cunning, physical strength, personal charm, and unbending principles, to overcome the wicked aggressors. With an illiteracy of over 80 per cent at the time, the "Screen Beast" personified the masses' dreams of defeating the wealthy, who were above the law thanks to an unjust class system.

Screenwriter Abd-el-Hay Adeeb once had to rewrite a scene in a film after it had been released: Shawqi's character was slapped on the back of the neck, which is a sign of contempt in southern Mediterranean countries; the cinema audience in the city of Assiut rioted in protest, destroying the building.

In 1969, Youssef Chahine's film al-Ard ("The Land") ended with the main character being dragged to his death behind the horse of a corrupt police officer. Audiences called for the "Beast" - Shawqi - to come to his rescue, despite the fact that Shawqi did not appear in that film.

A number of critics spent a great deal of time discussing the phenomenon as it was clear that Shawqi lived in the psyche of the nation as an image greater than reality and he represented hope and implementation of justice during the totalitarian military rule in the 1950s and 60's, such as the two films; Ana El-Hareb ("I'm the Fugitive") (1962) and Thalath Losoos ("Three Thieves") (1966), both produced by Salah Zulfikar Films, owned by Shawqi's friend and prominent film producer, movie star Salah Zulfikar. With the influence of Egyptian cinema on the whole of the Middle Eastern cinema, the "Beast of the Silver Screen" had a similar status in all Arabic-speaking nations, where the main entertainment was, and still to a large degree, Egyptian films.

Film producers and financiers called Shawqi - Malek el-Terso - or the King of the Third Class (Terso is an Egyptian slang word derived from the Italian word referring to the cheap third class seats in the cinema from which the bulk of the box office takings came). Shawqi was born in July 1920 in El Baghghala neighborhood of Cairo's popular quarter of Al-Sayyedah Zynab, where the majority of residents were the terso- film goers when Egyptian cinema started turning into a big industry. Shawqi worked as a civil servant as the Second World War broke out. He was given small parts in Ramsis Theatre group headed by Youssef Bay Wahby, then he worked with Anwar Wagdy doing small parts on the silver screen. He also formed a local theatre group `The National League of Acting' which included his young wife actress Zainab Abd-el-Hady whom he married in 1941, they had one daughter Mona. They were divorced four years later, when he married his second wife, dancer Saneya Shawqi, whom he also divorced in 1950.

By 1943 the NLA became The 20 Theatre as the members grew to 20 all became household names in Egyptian theatre and cinema for decades to come. The group specialized in presenting Chekov's plays, and Shawqi excelled in playing the leading parts and before, he played plenty of villain roles such as his role in Ana al-Madi ("I'm the Past") (1951) of Ezz El-Dine Zulficar - later on he loved to play classic parts in screenplays of novels by Nobel Prize holder Naguib Mahfouz. One of them was playing the role of Sultan in the film Bidaya wa nihaya (1960).

With success in theatre, and small parts in films, Shawqi left his post at the civil service in 1946. Few months later the 20 Theatre became the nucleus of the Higher Institute of Drama. In 1947 he made his mark in the film “Mala’eka Fi Gohanam” 'Angels in Hell' of Hassan Al-Imam. With his third wife, singer and actress Huda Sultan, whom he married in 1951, they made a famous partnership in more than 80 films. The marriage lasted 18 years and produced two daughters Maha and Nahed who is a successful film producer in her own right. He was working on a script for his daughter Abir in film dealing with homeless young people just before he died.

== Personal life ==
Shawqi's brother was the late General Staff of Egyptian police Ahmad Shawqi.

Shawqi married Huda Sultan and had two daughters with her; one of them, Nahed Shawqi, is now a movie producer.

In 1970, he married Soheir Tork, they stayed together until he died, she gave him two daughters, Abeer, who is a film director, and Rania, who is a well-known actress.

He was survived by wife Soheir Turk and five daughters Mona, Nahed, Maha, Abeer and Rania.

== Tribute ==
On July 30, 2014, Google showed a Doodle celebrating what would have been his 94th birthday.
