= Youssef Wahbi =

Egyptian film director and actor

- يوسف وهبي
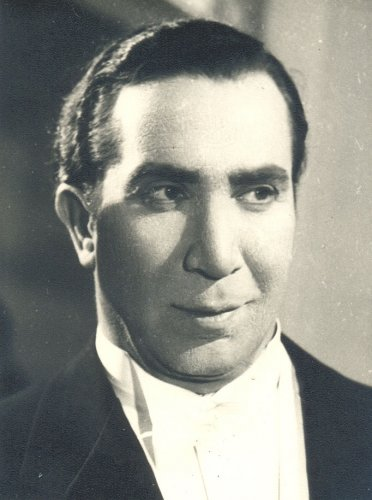
- Born: Youssef Wahby; 14 July 1902; Fayoum, Egypt
- Died: 17 October 1982 (aged 80); Cairo, Egypt
- Occupation: Actor • director • producer
- Years active: 1932–1978

Youssef Abdallah Wahbi Qotb (Arabic: يوسف عبد الله هديب وهبي قطب) (14 July 1902 – 17 October 1982) was an Egyptian stage, film actor and director, a leading star of the 1930s and 1940s and one of the most prominent Egyptian stage actors of all time, who also served on the jury of the Cannes Film Festival in 1946.

He was born to a high state official in Egypt but renounced his family's wealth and traveled to Rome in the 1919 to study theatre, married with Elena Lunda. Besides his stage work, he acted in around 50 films in Egyptian cinema, starting with Awlad al-Zawat (Sons of Aristocrats, 1932) to "Iskanderiya... lih?" (Alexandria... Why?, 1978).

== Early life ==
Youssef Wahbi was born into an Egyptian family, from the Fayoum region. He was named after the place where he was born, Bahr Yussef and his father worked as the chief inspector in Fayoum for the Ministry of Water Resources and Irrigation.

== Career ==
In 1926, Turkish filmmaker Vedat Örfi Bengü approached Wahbi to play the role of the Prophet Muhammed in a European film which would be financed by the Turkish government and a German producer. Whilst the President of Turkey, Mustafa Kemal Atatürk, and the Istanbul council of ulamas gave their approval to the film, the Islamic Al-Azhar University in Cairo published a juridical decision stipulating that Islam forbids the representation of the prophet and his companions. Thereafter, King Fouad warned Whabi that he would be exiled and stripped of his Egyptian citizenship if he took part in the film. Consequently, the film was later abandoned.

Wahbi started acting in the golden age of the Egyptian Cinema in 1932, he has also starred in several plays which he translated into many languages due to his fluency in English, French, and Italian, along with his native Arabic tongue. He played many roles that were different and unusual for both Egyptian film and plays. He once played the Devil and he later on wanted to play Muhammad but the media and Al-Azhar University, the authoritative institution on Sunni Islam, were opposed to the idea and he was forbidden from going through with it.

== Social Advocacy ==
As a playwright, director, and actor, Wahbi, had critiqued colonialism as well as Egyptian social customs and norms. He also was a strong social advocate with his calls to repeal the then mandated rule that a married women must live with her husband in a house of his choice. He advocated for women to have a choice in where they lived as well as for equal labor rights for women.

== Death ==
He died in 1982 at the age of 84 in Cairo, Egypt, sick with arthritis and with a fractured pelvis. He was survived by his wife.

Even though he came from a very rich family, throughout his career and life his focus was the film industry.

== Selected filmography ==
Year	Film	Role	International English Name(s)
1932	Awlad el zawat	Actor	a.k.a. the Spoiled Children or Sons of Aristocrats
1935	Al Defaa	Actor and director	a.k.a. The defense
1937	El Magid el khalid	Actor	a.k.a. Eternal Glory
1938	Saet el tanfiz	Actor	a.k.a. The Hour of Fate
1940	Leila momtera	Actor	a.k.a. Stormy night
1941	Leila, bint el rif	actor	a.k.a. Leila, the schoolgirl
1941	Areess min Istambul	Actor	a.k.a. A Suitor from Istanbul
1944	Gharam wa intiqam	Actor and director	a.k.a. Love and Revenge
1944	Berlanti	Actor, writer and director	a.k.a. Berlanti
1945	Safeer Gohannam	Actor and director	a.k.a. The Ambassador of Hell
1946	Malak Elrahma	Actor and director	a.k.a. The Angel of Mercy
1949	Ghazal Al Banat	Actor (as himself)	a.k.a. The Flirtation of Girls
1951	Amina	Actor	a.k.a. Amina
1955	Hayat ou maut	Actor	a.k.a. Life or Death
1955	Bahr El-Gharam	Actor	a.k.a. Sea of Love
1960	Mal Wa Nissa	Actor	a.k.a. Money and Women
1960	Isha't Hub	Actor	a.k.a. A Rumor of Love
1967	Come rubammo la bomba atomica	Actor	
1973	Al-Bahth 'An Fadiha	Actor	Searching for a Scandal
1979	Iskanderija... lih?	Actor	a.k.a. Alexandria... Why?
