= List of Egyptian films of 1960 =

A list of films produced in Egypt in 1960. For an A-Z list of films currently on Wikipedia, see Category:Egyptian films.

Title	Director	Cast	Genre	Notes
Bidaya wa Nihaya (Beginning and End)	Salah Abu Seif	Amina Rizk, Omar Sharif, Sanaa Gamil, Farid Shawki	Drama	Novel by Naguib Mahfouz; entered into the 2nd Moscow International Film Festival
El Ragol El Thani (The Second Man)	Ezzel Dine Zulficar	Sabah, Salah Zulfikar, Rushdy Abaza	Suspense	
Eshaet Hob (A Rumor of Love)	Fatin Abdel Wahab	Soad Hosni, Omar Sharif, Youssef Wahbi	Comedy	
Mal wa Nisaa (Money and Women)	Hassan El Imam	Salah Zulfikar, Soad Hosny, Youssef Wahbi	Drama	
Hobbi al-Wahid (My Only Love)	Kamal El Sheikh	Omar have Sharif, Nadia Lutfi, Kamal Al-Shennawi	Romance	
Nahr al-Hob (The River of Love)	Ezzel Dine Zulficar	Faten Hamama, Omar Sharif	Drama	
Kholkhal Habiby (My Lover's Anklet)	Hassan Reda	Rushdy Abaza, Taheyya Kariokka, Mahmoud el-Meliguy	Drama	
Wa Aad Al Hob (And Love Returned)	Fatin Abdel Wahab	Samia Gamal, Ahmed Mazhar, Mahmoud el-Meliguy, Mohamed Tawfik	Romance	
Abou El Leil (Father of Darkness)	Hossam El Din Mostafa	Samia Gamal, Ahmed Ramzy, Zizi El Badrawy, Mahmoud el-Meliguy	Crime, Suspense	
El Imlak (The Giant)	Mahmoud Zulfikar	Farid Shawki, Mariam Fakhr Eddine, Emad Hamdy, Mahmoud El-Meliguy	Drama	
Bein Edeik (Take Me in Your Arms)	Youssef Chahine	Magda al-Sabahi, Shoukry Sarhan	Drama, Comedy	
Bahiya	Ramses Naguib	Lobna Abdel Aziz, Rushdy Abaza, Hussein Riad	Drama	
Hagenony (They're Driving Me Crazy)	Fatin Abdel Wahab	Ismail Yassine, Samia Gamal, Karima	Comedy	
Zawga men El Share (Wife of the street)	Hassan El Imam	Huda Sultan, Emad Hamdy, Kamal el-Shennawi	Crime, Drama	
Gharamyat Imraa	Tolba Radwan	Kamal el-Shennawi, Soad Hosny, Ahmed Ramzy	Drama	
Inni Attahim	Hassan El Imam	Zubaida Tharwat, Salah Zulfikar, Emad Hamdy		
Halak El-Sayedat (Ladies Barber)	Fatin Abdel Wahab	Ismail Yassine, Abdel Salam Al Nabulsy, Karima	Comedy	
Nisaa' wa Zi’ab (Women and Wolves)	Hossam El Din Mostafa	Hend Rostom, Emad Hamdy, Hassan Youssef		
El Nas Eli That (The People Downstairs)	Kamel El-Telmissany	Youssef Wahby, Mary Moneib	Comedy	
Sokar Hanem	El Sayed Bedir	Samia Gamal, Kamal el-Shennawi, Abdel Moneim Ibrahim, Omar Al Hariri	Comedy	
Lokmet El-Aish (A Scrap of Bread)	Niazi Mostafa	Salah Zulfikar, Maha Sabry, Adel Khairy	Comedy	
Shahr Asal Basal (The Honeymoon Fell Flat)	Issa Karama	Ismail Yassine, Mary Moneib, Kariman	Comedy	
Thalath Regal wa Imraa (3 Men and a Woman)	Helmy Halim	Sabah, Kamal el-Shennawi, Abdel Salam Al Nabulsy, Soad Hosny		
Gharam Fi El-Cirq (Romance in the Circus)	Hussein Fawzy	Ismail Yassine, Berlanty Abdel Hamid, Nagwa Fouad	Comedy	
Lawet El-Hob (Agony of Love)	Salah Abu Seif	Shadia, Ahmed Mazhar, Omar Sharif	Drama, Romance	
Wadaa Ya Hob (Farewell to Love)	Hossam El Din Mostafa	Mariam Fakhr Eddine, Muharram Fouad, Nagwa Fouad	Drama,	
Hoby El-Wahid (My Only Love)	Kamal El Sheikh	Omar Sharif, Nadia Lutfi, Kamal el-Shennawi	Drama, Romance	
El-Fanoos El-Sehry (The Magic Lantern)	Fatin Abdel Wahab	Ismail Yassine, Abdel Salam Al Nabulsy, Kariman	Comedy	
Bein El-Sama Wel Ard (Between Heaven and Earth)	Salah Abu Seif	Hend Rostom, Abdel Moneim Ibrahim, Abdel Moneim Madbouly	Comedy, Drama, Suspense	
Malaak wa Shaytan (Angel and Devil)	Kamal El Sheikh	Rushdy Abaza, Zaki Rostom, Mariam Fakhr Eddine	Drama	
Saedat Al-Rigal	Hassan El Imam	Huda Sultan, Shukry Sarhan, Mahmoud El-Meliguy	Drama	
Ser Imraa (Woman's Secret)	Atef Salem	Huda Sultan, Salah Zulfikar, Emad Hamdy	Drama, Crime, Suspense	
Nida’ El Oshaq	Youssef Chahine	Shukry Sarhan, Berlanty Abdel Hamid, Farid Shawky	Drama	
Amalekt El Bihar	El Sayed Bedir	Ahmed Mazhar, Nadia Lutfi,	Drama	
