= List of Egyptian films of 1956 =

A list of films produced in Egypt in 1956. For an A-Z list of films currently on Wikipedia, see Category:Egyptian films.

Title	Director	Cast	Genre	Notes
Maw`ed Gharam (Appointment with Love)	Henry Barakat	Faten Hamama, Abdel Halim Hafez, Rushdy Abaza	Drama / musical	
Uyoon Sahrana (Wakeful Eyes)	Ezz El-Dine Zulficar	Salah Zulfikar, Shadia	Drama, Romance	
Sira` Fi al-Mina (Struggle in the Pier)	Youssef Chahine	Faten Hamama, Omar Sharif, Ahmed Ramzy	Drama, Romance	
Shabab emraa (The Leech)	Salah Abu Seif	Taheyya Kariokka, Shoukry Sarhan, Shadia	Drama	Entered into the 1956 Cannes Film Festival
