= List of awards and nominations received by Faten Hamama =

Throughout Faten Hamama's career, she has received numerous accolades for best actress, and was nominated for the Cannes Film Festival’s Prix International for her role in 1950's Your Day Will Come. She received her first award in 1951 for her role in I'm the Past, which was presented to her by different venues, including the Egyptian Catholic Center for Cinema. The country's Ministry of Guidance also awarded her the title of Best Actress in both 1955 and 1961.

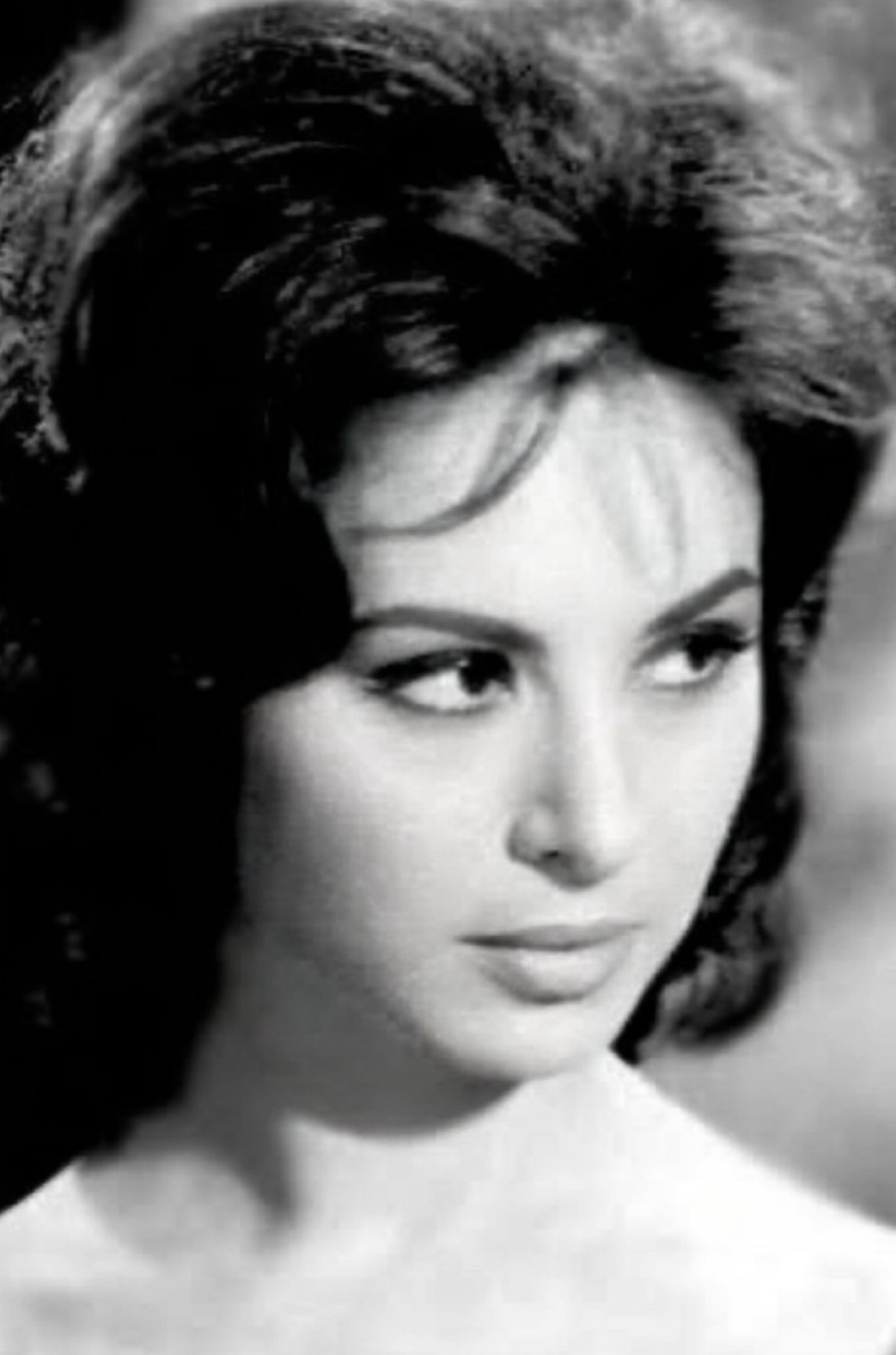
Faten Hamama

These were followed by many different awards for best actress from various national and international events. International ones included special awards for acting at the first Tehran International Film Festival in 1972 for her role in The Thin Thread, and in 1977 for her role in Mouths and Rabbits. In 1973, she received the Special Award at the Moscow International Film Festival for her role in Empire M. Other international accolades include the Best Actress awards at the Jakarta International Film Festival in 1963 for her role in The Open Door, and at the Carthage Film Festival in 1988 for her role in Bitter Days, Nice Days. Hamama was also a recipient of the Lebanese Order of Merit in 1984 for her role in The Night of Fatma's Arrest. She was later presented lifetime achievement awards, including one at the Montpellier Mediterranean Film Festival in 1993, and another at the Dubai International Film Festival in 2009.

== Awards won ==
Throughout Hamama's career, she has won many awards for her acting roles:

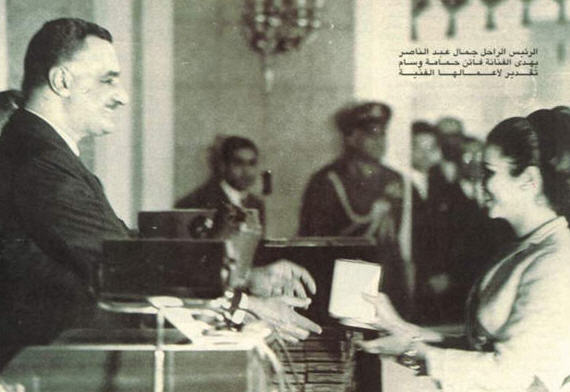
Honored by Order of the Republic for Art (first degree) from President Gamal Abdel Nasser (1965)

=== 1950s ===
- First prize of acting for the movie Ana al-Madi (I'm the Past) (1951)
- First prize of acting and best Egyptian movie presented in Beirout for Irham Dmoo'i (Have Mercy) (1954)
- Maw'ed Maa al-Sa'ada (Appointment with Happiness) receives Prize of acting from the Egyptian Catholic Center for Cinema Festival (1954)
- Irham Dmoo'i receives first Prize of acting from Ministry of Guidance for movies that covered season 1954-1955 (1955)
- Al-Tareeq al-Masdood (Dead end) & Hatta Naltaqi (Until we meet) receive prizes of acting from the Egyptian Catholic Center for Cinema (1958)
- Prize of acting on her role in the movie Bain al-Atlal (Among the Ruins) (1959)

=== 1960s ===
- Doaa al-Karawan (The Nightingale's Prayer) receives the Prize of Acting from Ministry of Guidance (1961)
- Doaa al-Karawan received First Prize of acting from the National State award that covered movies from seasons 1959, 1960, 1961, 1962 (1963)
- Best actress award from the Jakarta International Film Festival on her role in Albab aL-Maftouh (The Open Door) (1963)
- First Prize of acting from the National State award for the movie Al Leila Al Akhira (The Last Night) (1965)

=== 1970s ===
- Al-Kheit al-Rafee (The Thin Thread) received the Special Award in the first Tehran International Film Festival (1972)
- Special award from the Soviet Union of Women for the movie, Empire M, in the Moscow International Film Festival (1973)
- A Diploma of honor and the Diploma of recognition for her role and the idea for Oreedo Hallan (I Need a Solution) in the third Tehran International Film Festival (1974)
- The Organization of Film Critics and Writers' Prize of Recognition for her role in Oreedo Hallan (1975)
- The Prize of Excellence in the Festival of Egyptian Films for her role in Oreedo Hallan (1976)
- Best Actress award from the Tehran International Film festival on her role for Afwah Wa Araneb (Mouths and Rabbits) (1977)
- Best actress award from the Second Cairo International Film Festival, (Golden Nefertiti Award) for her role in Afwah Wa Araneb (1977)
- Special Recognition award from President Anwar Al Sadat for her role inAfwah Wa Araneb (1977)

=== 1980s ===
- USSR Cinema Prize in Moscow (1983)
- Lebanese Golden Order of Merit Prize for her role in the movie Leilet Al Qabd Ala Fatma (The Night of Fatma's Arrest) (1984)
- Prize of Recognition and Life Achievement Award from the Organization of Cinematic Art for her role in the movie Leilet Al Qabd Ala Fatma (1984)
- Best Actress award from Carthage International Film Festival, Tunisia for her role inYawm Mor.. Yawm Helo (Bitter Days.. Nice Days) (1988)
- Best actress award from the Organization of Film for her role inYawm Mor.. Yawm Helo (1989)

=== 1990s ===
- Best Artistic Achievement award from the Cairo International Festival (1991)
- Lifetime Achievement Award from the Montpelier Mediterranean Film Festival (1993)
- Best actress award from the Egyptian Catholic Center during its celebration for her role in Ard al-Ahlam (Land of Dreams) (1994)
- Best Actress award from Cairo International Festival for her contribution to the Egyptian Cinema where 18 of her films were selected amongst the best 150 movies ever made until 1996 during the celebration of a 100 years of cinema (1996)

=== 2000 and later ===
- The Honorary Award from The Radio and Television Festival for her role in Wajh al-Kamar (2001)
- The Prize and award of the First Arabic Women presented by Nazik Hariri and Bahia Hariri (2001)
- Prize of recognition from first Sala international film festival, Morocco, for her contribution to women's issues through her artistic career (2004)

== Nominations ==
=== 1940s ===
- Sitt Elbait (Lady of the House) presented in Cannes International Film Festival (1949)

=== 1950s ===
- Ebn Elnile (Son of the Nile) presented in Venice International Film Festival (1951)
- Ebn Elnile nominated in Cannes International Film Festival for the Prix International award (1952)
- Lak youm Ya Zalem (Your Day will Come) selected in Berlin International Film Festival to be part of main competition (1953)
- Cannes Film Festival selects the movie Serai Fil Wadi (Struggle in the Valley), to be part of main competition for the Prix International award (1954)

=== 1960s ===
- Berlin International Film Festival selects the movie Doaa al-Karawan (The Nightingale's Prayer), to be part of main competition (1960)
- Karlovy Vary International Film Festival selects the movie La Totf'e al-Shams (The Sun Will Never Set), to be part of main competition (1962)
- Cannes Film Festival selects the movie Al Leila Al Akhira (The Last Night), to be part of main competition for the Prix International award (1964)
- Cannes Film Festival selects the movie Al Haram (The Sin) to be part of main competition for the Prix International award (1965)

== Honors ==
Hamama was also honored on several occasions:

=== 1950s ===
- Honored by the Decoration of Creativity of first degree from prime minister, Prince Khaled Shehab, Lebanon (1953)

=== 1960s ===
- A Guest of Honor in Moscow International Film Festival. In that event she also had an interview with Yuri Gagarin (first human in space) for the Egyptian Radio (1961)
- Selected as Jury Member for the Berlin International Film Festival (1964)
- Honored by the Decoration of Republic of first degree for Art from president Gamal Abdel Nasser (1965)

=== 1970s ===
- Honored by the Decoration of State of the first order from President Mohamed Anwar Sadat during first Art festival (1976)
- Jury Member for Carthage International Film Festival (1978)

=== 1990s ===
- Jury Member for Cairo International Film Festival (1991)
- Selected as the President of Juries for the first Paris Biennale of Arab Cinema (1992)
- Honorary award from the Egyptian National Festival for Cinema for her long distinguished cinematic career (1995)
- Prince Talal bin Abdulaziz selects Faten Hamama as an Honorary advisory member in the organization of Children development (1999)
- PhD from the American University in Cairo (1999)

=== 2000 and later ===
- Lifetime achievement award as the Star of the Century in Egyptian cinema at the Alexandria International Film Festival (2001)
- Honored by the Decoration of "Al-Arz" (Lebanese Cedar) from Lebanese President Émile Lahoud (2001)
- Honored by the Decoration of Competence and Creation from King Mohamed El Hassan the Sixth of Morocco (2001)
- On June 14, 2013, the American University of Beirut awarded Faten Hamama with an honorary doctorate. The University President Peter Dorman introduced the Egyptian actress as an “icon, legend, and luminary.” However, “I feel a great happiness, today, greater than any gift that I have ever received. Currently, there is a massive attack on art, culture and anything related to literature. So this honorary doctorate will not only make me happy, but will bring happiness to all the artists and cultured people in Egypt and the Arab world.” said Hamama, after receiving her doctorate from Beirut, Lebanon.
