= Ezz El-Dine Zulficar Films Company =

Egyptian film production company

ِEzz El-Dine Zulficar Films
- Trade name: ِEzz El-Dine Zulficar Films
- Native name: شركة أفلام عز الدين ذو الفقار
- Type: Private sector
- Industry: Film
- Founded: 1958
- Founder: Ezz El-Dine Zulficar, Salah Zulfikar
- Defunct: 1963
- Headquarters: Cairo, Egypt
- Area served: Middle East • North Africa
- Key people: Ezz El-Dine Zulficar, Salah Zulfikar
- Products: Motion pictures
- Services: Filmmaking
- Owner: Ezz El-Dine Zulficar, Salah Zulfikar

Ezz El-Dine Zulficar Films Company (Arabic: شركة أفلام عز الدين ذو الفقار, aka: Ezz El-Dine Zulficar Films) is a film production company founded in Cairo by Ezz El-Dine Zulfikar and Salah Zulfikar in 1958. The company operated in the Middle East and North Africa since 1958 until 1963.

== History ==
In 1958, the Zulfikar brothers; Ezz El-Dine Zulficar and Salah Zulfikar established a film production corporation under the trade name of Ezz El-Dine Zulficar Films. Salah took over the administrative side. The Zulfikar brothers produced their first film; Among the Ruins (Bain Al Atlal) (1959) starring Faten Hamama, Emad Hamdy and Salah Zulfikar. The film was directed by Ezz El-Dine Zulficar and was commercially and critically successful. Later, it was listed later in the Top 100 Egyptian films. Their second venture was The Second Man (Al Ragol Al Thani) (1959) directed by Ezz El-Dine Zulficar, featuring Salah Zulfikar in two roles alongside Rushdy Abaza, Samia Gamal and Sabah. The film was a box-office hit.

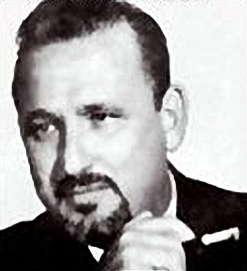
Ezz El-Dine Zulficar

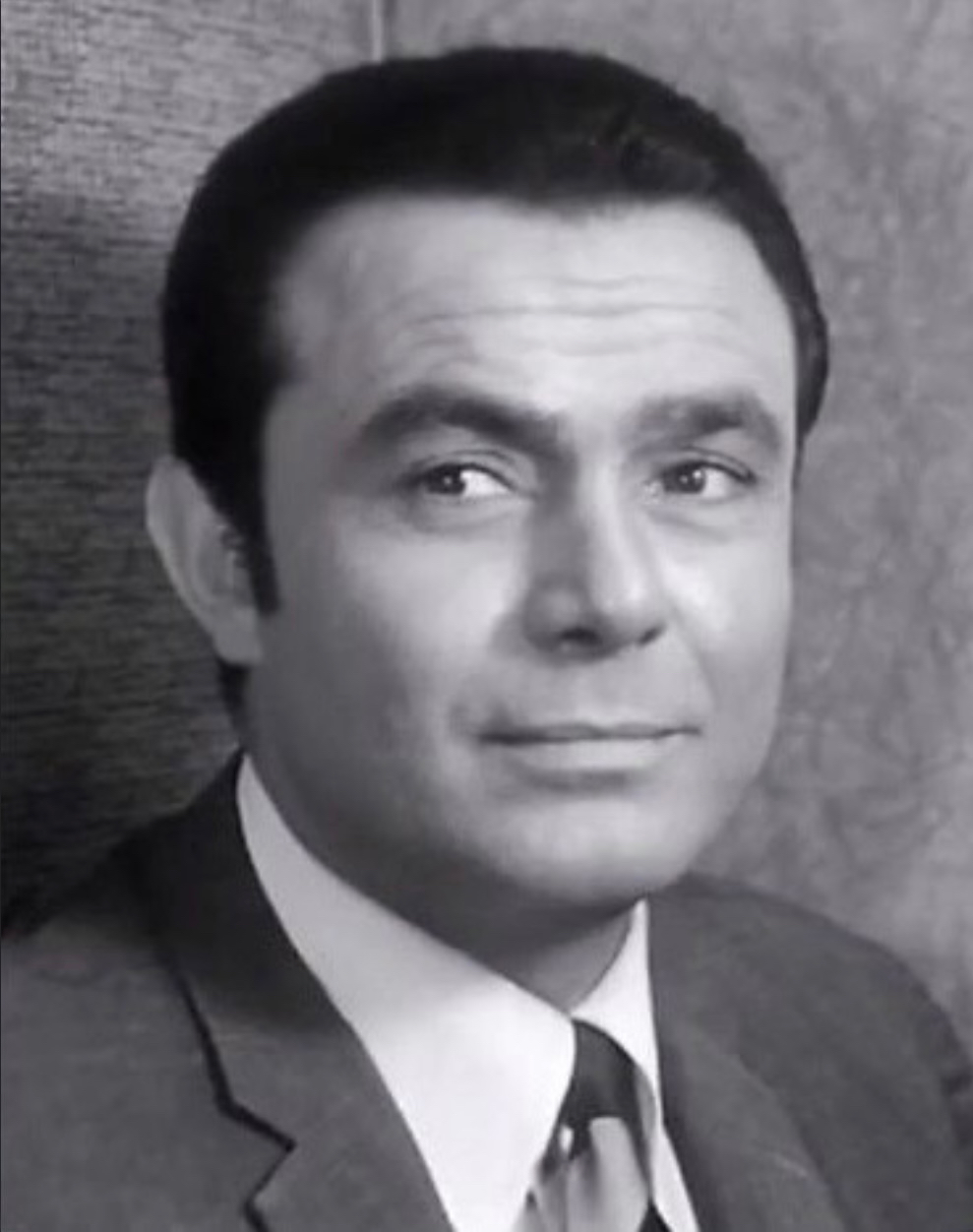
Salah Zulfikar

In 1960, they produced Angel and Devil (Malaak wa Shaytan) starring Rushdy Abaza and directed by Kamal El Sheikh. The film was another breakthrough to Rushdy Abaza after his success in The Second Man. Followed by The Holy Bond (Al Rabat Al Moqaddas) (1960) starring Sabah, Salah Zulfikar, Emad Hamdy, and directed by their older brother Mahmoud Zulfikar, the film later became an Egyptian cinematic classic. Their next venture was Tewfik Saleh's Struggle of the Heroes (1962) (Sir'a Al-Abtal), which was later listed in the Top 100 Egyptian films. The company’s final venture was Black Candles (Al-Shomoo' Al-Sawdaa) (1962) featuring Nagat, Saleh Selim and Fouad El-Mohandes, the film was a financial and critical success.

In 1996, in the centenary of Egyptian cinema, two productions of Ezz El-Dine Zulficar Films were listed in the Top hundred Egyptian films of the 20th century.

== Films ==
Year	Title	Native Title
1959	Among the Ruins	Bayn al Atlal, بين الأطلال
1959	The Second Man	Al Rajul al Thani, الرجل الثاني
1960	Angel and Devil	Malaak wa Sheitan, ملاك وشيطان
1960	The Holy Bond	Al Rebat Al Moqaddas, الرباط المقدس
1961	Without Tears	Bela Domoo', بلا دموع
1962	Struggle of the Heroes	Sira’ Al-Abtal', صراع الأبطال
1962	The Black Candles	Al Shumou Al Sawda', الشموع السوداء

== See also ==
- Egyptian cinema
- Lists of Egyptian films
- List of film production companies
