= Khulood =

- Film poster
- Directed by: Ezz El-Dine Zulficar
- Written by: Ezz El-Dine Zulficar
- Produced by: Hassan Mustafa
- Starring: Ezz El-Dine Zulficar; Kamal al-Shennawi; Faten Hamama; Ismail Yasseen
- Cinematography: Mostafa Hassan
- Production company: Cairo Films Company
- Distributed by: Cairo Films Company
- Release date: 1948
- Country: Egypt
- Language: Arabic

Khulood (Arabic: خلود, English: Immortality, also transliterated Khulud and Kholud) is an Egyptian 1948 romance film written, directed by and starring Ezz El-Dine Zulficar. It also stars Faten Hamama and Kamal al-Shennawi. It is the only film that Zulficar has acted in.

== Plot ==
A man named Mahmoud falls in love with Layla, a beautiful lady. Another man, Hasan, has also fallen in love with Layla. Layla is shot as a consequence of their vying for her affections. Amal, Layla's daughter, also loves Nabil, Hasan's son.

== Cast ==
- Ezz El-Dine Zulficar as Mahmoud.
- Faten Hamama as Layla / Amal.
- Kamal al-Shennawi as Hasan / Nabil.
- Ismail Yasseen as Ismail.
