= The Road of Hope =

1957 film

Tareeq al-Amal طريق الأمل
- Poster
- Directed by: Ezz El-Dine Zulficar
- Written by: Youssef Gohar
- Produced by: Helmy Rafla
- Starring: Faten Hamama; Rushdy Abaza; Shukry Sarhan
- Release date: 1957
- Running time: 105 minutes
- Country: Egypt
- Language: Arabic

Tareeq al-Amal (Arabic: طريق الأمل, The Road of Hope) is a 1957 Egyptian romance/drama film directed by the Egyptian film director Ezz El-Dine Zulficar. It starred Rushdy Abaza, Shukry Sarhan, and Faten Hamama.

== Plot ==
Saneya (Faten Hamama) is a young woman whose mother suffers from a malicious disease that forbids her from working. This leaves her and her mother with no money, which forces her to work as a prostitute. One day she meets a Hussein (Shukry Sarhan) who sympathizes with her situation and decides to save her from this unpleasant work. He falls in love with her and decides to marry her, but his mother (Ulweya Gameel) does not allow him because of who she is. Saneya returns to working as a prostitute. One day, she saves her lover's sister (Zahret El-Ula) which convinces his mother who accepts her as her son's wife.
