= Appointment of Love =

Appointment with Love
- Maw`ed Gharam poster
- Directed by: Henry Barakat
- Written by: Ali El Zorkani; Helmy Halim
- Produced by: Wahid Farid; Ramsis Najib
- Starring: Faten Hamama; Abdel Halim Hafez; Rushdy Abaza; Zahrat El-Ola; Imad Hamdi
- Release date: January 3, 1956
- Country: Egypt
- Language: Arabic

Appointment with Love (Arabic: موعد غرام, translit. Maw`ed Gharam) is a 1956 Egyptian romance/musical film directed and co-written by the Egyptian film director Henry Barakat. It stars Abdel Halim Hafez, Faten Hamama, Rushdy Abaza, Zahrat El-Ola, and Imad Hamdi.

== Plot ==
Faten Hamama plays Nawal, a journalist who meets Samir, a young man. She encourages him to pursue a singing career and he does. He starts a successful career and becomes famous. Nawal gets paralyzed and, not willing to hinder his progress, tries to end their relationship without telling him the truth. Samir finds about the truth. Recognizing her great sacrifice, he returns to her and marries her.

== Main cast ==
- Faten Hamama as Nawal
- Abdel Halim Hafez as Samir
- Imad Hamdi as Kamal
- Zahrat El-Ola as Zahrah
- Rushdy Abaza
