= The Small Millionaire =

Al-Millionairah al-Saghirah المليونيرة الصغيرة
- Al-Millionairah al-Saghirah poster
- Directed by: Kamal Barakat
- Written by: Kamal Barakat
- Starring: Faten Hamama; Rushdy Abaza
- Release date: 1948
- Country: Egypt
- Language: Arabic

The Small Millionaire (Arabic: المليونيرة الصغيرة, translit. Al-Millionairah al-Saghirah) is an Egyptian 1948 drama film directed and written by Kamal Barakat. It stars Rushdy Abaza and Faten Hamama.

== Plot ==
A beautiful, young lady falls in love with a pilot officer and wants to marry him, but her grandmother, of a Turkish aristocratic family, doesn't concur and would not allow her to marry the man. One of the family members tries to convince the grandmother to accept this. The grandmother dies and the woman inherits some of her wealth. Her lover becomes hesitant towards their marriage, thinking everybody might assume he married her for her wealth. She convinces him that this is not true and trusts him and loves him, so they marry each other.

== Cast ==
- Faten Hamama as the young woman.
- Rushdy Abaza as the pilot officer.
- Mary Munib
- Fouad Shafiq
