= Abu Zayd al-Hilali (film) =

Abu Zayd al-Hilali أبو زيد الهلالي
- Faten Hamama in Abu Zayd al-Hilali
- Directed by: Ezzel Dine Zulficar
- Written by: Ezzel Dine Zulficar; Abu Buthaina
- Produced by: Mohamed Amin
- Starring: Faten Hamama; Seraj Munir; Amina al-Sharif
- Release date: 1947
- Country: Egypt
- Language: Arabic

Abu Zayd al-Hilali (Arabic: أبو زيد الهلالي) is a 1947 Egyptian film that portrays the life of the tenth-century Arab leader Abu Zayd al-Hilali. It was directed by Ezzel Dine Zulficar and written by Zulficar and Abu Butheina. It stars Faten Hamama, Seraj Munir, and Amina al-Sharif. It was one of Hamama's earliest starring roles.

== Plot ==
Abu Zayd al-Hilali's son and wife escape and years later, after his son has grown into a powerful and idealistic man, a battle between the two tribes starts. The son fights his father but is not aware who he is fighting. The Banu Hilalis defeat the Banu Zahlanis. Back home, Abu Zayd is greeted as a hero. A huge war then starts with the Zirids, who had abandoned Shiism. The Banu Hilalis weaken the Zirid state and plunder their lands.

== Cast ==
- Seraj Munir as Abu Zayd al-Hilali
- Faten Hamama as daughter of the Caliph
- Amina Sharif as Abu Zayd's mother
- Lula Sidqi
- Ahmed El Bey
- Fakher Fakher
