= Andre Ryder =

Greek-Egyptian composer

ORE Andre Ryder
- Also known as: Andre Ryder, Andrea Ryder
- Born: Andreas Anagnostou (Ανδρέας Αναγνώστου); 10 August 1908; Greece
- Died: 5 March 1971 (aged 62) Buenos Aires, Argentina
- Genres: Film score
- Occupation: Composer

Andre or Andrea Ryder, born Andreas Anagnostou or Anagnostis (Egyptian Arabic: اندريا رايـدر; Greek: Ανδρέας Αναγνώστου/Αναγνώστης; 1908–1971) was a Greek-Egyptian composer who lived and worked in Egypt in his later years.

== Biography ==
Ryder travelled to Egypt and lived there and worked as a film composer, and was granted Egyptian citizenship in 1970. He composed music for 61 Egyptian films and 6 Greek films. His Egyptian films include; El Ard el Tayeba (1954), Wakeful Eyes (1956), The Second Man (1959), Forbidden Women (1959), Malaak wa Shaytan (1960), Woman's Secret (1960), El Hub Keda (1961), Letter from an Unknown Woman (1962), Aghla Min Hayati (1965), and The Man Who Lost His Shadow (1968).

Ryder was awarded the Order of the Republic by President Gamal Abdel Nasser. He was celebrated as Best Composer in The Centenary of Andre Ryder held at Bibliotheca Alexandrina in 2008.

Ryder was killed in a fight in Buenos Aires, Argentina, during one of his tours on 5 March 1971.
