= Malaak wa Shaytan =

1961 film

- Directed by: Kamal El Sheikh
- Written by: Sabry Ezzat
- Screenplay by: Sabry Ezzat; Kamal El Sheikh
- Produced by: Salah Zulfikar; Ezz El-Dine Zulficar
- Starring: Rushdy Abaza; Zaki Rostom
- Cinematography: Masoud Eissa
- Music by: Andre Ryder
- Production company: Ezz El-Dine Zulficar Films Company
- Distributed by: El Sharq Film Distribution
- Release date: 22 February 1960 (Egypt)
- Running time: 107 minutes
- Country: Egypt
- Language: Egyptian Arabic

Malaak wa Shaytan (Arabic: ملاك وشيطان, Malak wa shaitan, English: Angel and Devil) is a 1960 Egyptian drama film directed by Kamal El Sheikh and starring Rushdi Abaza. The film is produced by Salah Zulfikar and Ezz El-Dine Zulficar for Ezz El-Dine Zulficar Films Company and released in Egypt on 22 February 1960 by El Sharq Film Distribution.

== Plot ==
Shawkat and Samira gave birth to a girl of between five or six years old. They are happy and well-off. Shawkat works as a jewelry seller. One day, thieves attacked them for stealing money and others. They were surprised by a money safe inside the house. When they tried to break the safe, the child saw them, so they ran away with it.

== Crew ==
- Directed by: Kamal El Sheikh
- Story: Sabry Ezzat
- Screenplay: Sabry Ezzat, Kamal El Sheikh
- Cinematography: Andre Ryder
- Producer: Salah Zulfikar, Ezz El-Dine Zulficar
- Production studio: Ezz El-Dine Zulficar Films
- Distribution: El Sharq Film Distribution

== Cast ==
- Rushdy Abaza as Ezzat
- Zaki Rustom as Shahhat
- Nagwa Fouad as Khairia
- Salah Zulfikar as Guest Appearance as Shawkat Selim
- Mariam Fakhr Eddine as Guest Appearance as Shawkat's wife
- Iman Zulfikar as Sawsan
- Ahmed Luxer as Detective
- Memo Ramses as Abu Sheffa
- Thoraya Fakhry as Dada

== Awards and nominations ==
The film was nominated for a Golden Bear at the 11th Berlin International Film Festival.

== See also ==
- Salah Zulfikar filmography
- List of Egyptian films of 1960
- List of Egyptian films of the 1960s
- List of submissions to the 33rd Academy Awards for Best Foreign Language Film
- List of Egyptian submissions for the Academy Award for Best Foreign Language Film
