= The Mamelukes =

1965 film

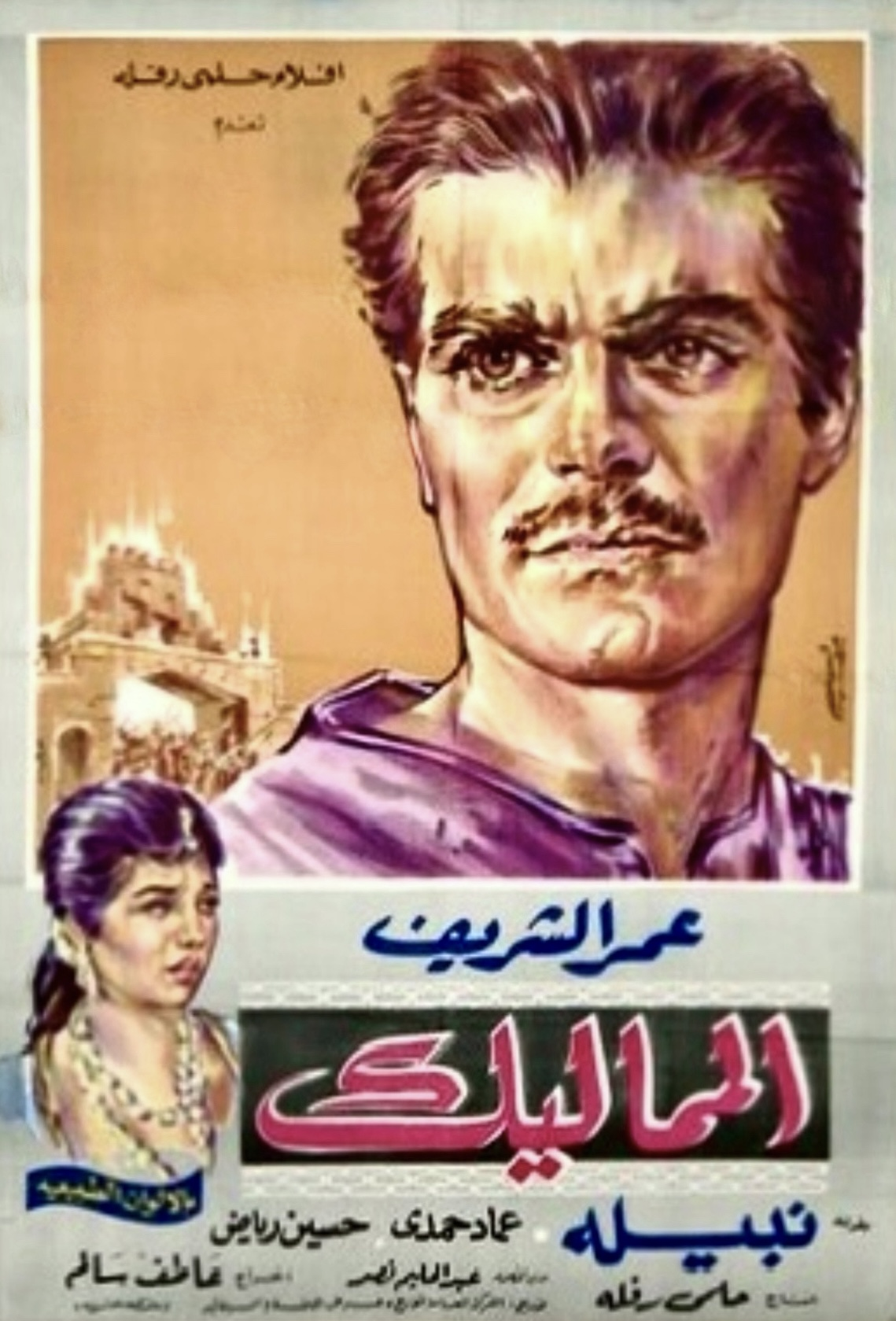
- Theatrical release poster
- Directed by: Atef Salem
- Written by: Nayruz Abdel Malek (story); Mohammed Mostafa Samy (dialogue)
- Screenplay by: Abdul Hai Adib
- Produced by: Helmy Rafla
- Starring: Omar Sharif; Nabila Ebeid; Emad Hamdy
- Cinematography: Mohsen Nasr
- Edited by: Albert Naguib
- Music by: Ali Ismael
- Production company: Al Qahera Cinema
- Distributed by: El Sharq Distribution
- Release date: 4 October 1965 (Egypt)
- Running time: 110 minutes
- Country: Egypt
- Language: Egyptian Arabic

The Mamelukes is a 1965 Egyptian epic film directed by Atef Salem and starring Omar Sharif, Nabila Ebeid and Emad Hamdy. It is written by Abdul Hai Adib (screenplay) and Mohammed Mostafa Samy (dialogue). The film is based on a story by Nayruz Abdel Malek, inspired by true events from the Mamluk Egypt period. The Mamelukes was produced by Helmy Rafla for Al Qahera Cinema and was released on October 4, 1965 by El Sharq Distribution.

The film received mixed reviews, with much publicity going towards the film being Omar Sharif's comeback to Egyptian cinema since 1961.

== Synopsis ==
After the Egyptians suffered from the oppression of the Mamluks, the people united and organized popular resistance to eliminate them and get rid of the Circassian ruler and the commander of his guard. The beloved Ahmed and Qamar joined the resistance despite the torment they were subjected to. Ahmed was determined to avenge the death of his mother at their hands.

== Crew ==
- Directed by: Atef Salem
- Story: Nayruz Abdul Malik
- Screenplay: Abdul Hai Adib
- Dialogue: Muhammad Mustafa Sami
- Cinematography: Abdel Halim Nasr
- Music: Ali Ismael
- Editing: Albert Naguib
- Producer: Helmy Rafla
- Production studio: Al Qahera Cinema
- Distribution: El Sharq Distribution

== Cast ==
- Omar Sharif as Ahmed
- Nabila Ebeid as Qamar
- Emad Hamdy as Minister Jaafar
- Hussein Riad as Circassian ruler
- Salah Jahin as Sheikh Saeed
- Amina Rizk as Ahmed's mother
- Fakhir Fakhir as Mahmoud El-Hadaad, Qamar's father
- Salah Nazmi as Aybak
- Muhammad El-Sabaa as Sheikh of the Mosque
- Ahmed El-Haddad as Bahloul
- Saeed Khalil as Assistant Minister Jaafar
- Mohamed Al-Toukhi as Sheikh Misbah
- Hussein Ismail as merchant
- Ibrahim Heshmat as Ismail Al-Durra
- Nahed Sabry as One of the slave girls
- Mohamed Sobeih
- Samia Rushdi
- Jamal Ismail
- Amal Sadiq
- Enas Abdullah
- Ali Kamel
- Abdul Nabi Muhammad

== See also ==
- Egyptian cinema
- List of Egyptian films of the 1960s
