= Appointment with Life =

1953 film by Ezzel Dine Zulficar

- Theatrical release poster
- Arabic: موعد مع الحياة
- Directed by: Ezz El-Dine Zulficar
- Written by: Ezz El-Dine Zulficar
- Screenplay by: Ezz El-Dine Zulficar
- Produced by: Ezz El-Dine Zulficar
- Starring: Faten Hamama; Shukry Sarhan; Shadia
- Cinematography: Wahid Farid
- Release date: 1953
- Running time: 115 minutes
- Country: Egypt
- Language: Egyptian Arabic

Appointment with Life (Arabic: موعد مع الحياة, Maw`ed Ma` al-Hayat) is a 1953 Egyptian drama film directed, written and produced by Ezz El-Dine Zulficar. The film stars Faten Hamama, Shoukry Sarhan and Shadia.

== Plot ==
(Faten Hamama) plays Amal, the only daughter of a famous doctor, who lives with Fatimah (Shadia). Fatimah has a crush on Mamdouh, Amal's father, and Amal is in love with Ahmed (Shoukry Sarhan), an engineer. Amal's father learns of a deadly disease that his daughter has, and decides to hide the truth from her. The doctors have told him that she has only about six months to live, if she can not be cured. Amal finds out and her father faces her with the truth. He requests a talented foreign specialist, who was actually able to cure her disease. She, after recovering, marries her longtime love, Ahmed.

== Primary cast ==
- Faten Hamama
- Shukry Sarhan
- Shadia
- Hussein Riad
- Omar El-Hareery
