= Struggle of the Heroes =

- صراع الأبطال
- Directed by: Tewfik Saleh
- Written by: Ezz El-Dine Zulficar; Abdel Hay Adib
- Screenplay by: Tawfik Saleh; Sabry Ezzat; Mohammed Abu Youssef
- Produced by: Ezz El-Dine Zulficar; Salah Zulfikar
- Starring: Shoukry Sarhan
- Cinematography: Salah Karim
- Edited by: Emil Bahary
- Music by: Fouad El Zahery
- Production company: Ezz El-Dine Zulficar Films Company
- Distributed by: General Egyptian Corporation for Cinema Production
- Release date: June 23, 1962 (Egypt)
- Country: Egypt
- Language: Egyptian Arabic

Struggle of the Heroes (aliases: Clash of the Heroes; Arabic: صراع الأبطال, translit: Sira’ Al-Abtal) is a 1962 Egyptian film directed by Tewfik Saleh, who also co-wrote the screenplay. It is listed in the Top 100 films in the Egyptian cinema of the 20th century list and Bibliotheca Alexandrina's 100 Greatest Egyptian Films.

== Plot ==
The film revolves around the newly graduated young doctor Shukri, who heads to live in that remote village in the countryside, and his goal is not only to relieve the population of their diseases, but to help them stave off poverty and hunger, for which he believes that predestination and backwardness are responsible. However, what Shukri will gradually discover, is that the responsibility for these two matters is not fatalistic, but is linked to the feudal Adel Bey who is pushing the people at every moment to live and act according to his will. Thus, when the young doctor understands this fact, he begins to confront the Adel Bey, helping the residents to claim their rights, and healing them, which creates a friendship between him and them, creating at the same time a conflict between him and the feudal lord, but also, between him and the local midwife Umm Hilal, who finds him a strong competitor to her. He won the hearts of the peasants and almost cut off their livelihood. At the same time, there are the English soldiers, who do not hesitate to throw the leftovers of their food to the peasants, which causes the spread of a disease that begins to infect people, only to be discovered by the doctor later that it is cholera, which quickly becomes an epidemic. When the doctor asks the residents here to stop eating the food thrown at them, the peasants abandon their obedience's. And here, instead of this conclusive evidence being a way to expose the doctor's credibility and push the population to obey his instructions to survive this epidemic. Shukri becomes society's enemy number one, he would almost give up had it not been for the Ministry of Interior to send him a force to protect him, as well as to surround the population in order for them to get out with their illness, Thanks to all of this, Shukri is able to heal the residents and thus prove that he was right. The Ministry appoints him in charge of fighting cholera, which causes him to move to another village, this time with his wife, to do the same.

== Main cast ==
- Shoukry Sarhan as Shoukry
- Samira Ahmed as Afaf
- Laila Taher
- Zozo Hamdi Al-Hakim as Umm Hilal
- Nigma Ibrahim
- Salah Nazmi
- Hussein Qandil
- Muhammad Badr Al-Din
- Iskandar Mansi
- Abdul Ghani Al-Nagdy
- Abbas Younes
- Laila Fahmy
- Abdel Moneim Saudi
- Aida Abdel Aziz
- Hussein Ismail
- Abdel Moneim Ismail
- Khairiya Ahmed
- Hayat Qandeel
- Badr Nofal
- Kawthar Ramzi
