= Helmy Rafla =

Egyptian film director (1909–1978)

- حلمي رفلة
- Born: May 15, 1909; Kingdom of Egypt
- Died: April 22, 1978 (aged 68); Lyon, France
- Occupations: Film director, screenwriter, film producer, make-up artist

Helmy Rafla (May 15, 1909 – April 22, 1978; Arabic: حلمي رفلة) was an Egyptian film director, screenwriter, film producer, and make-up artist. He is considered to be one of the most prominent Egyptian filmmakers.

== Biography ==
Helmy Rafla was born on 15 May 1909 in the Kingdom of Egypt.

Rafla did make-up for actress Umm Kulthum in many of her films, which allowed him travel to France to learn the art of make-up. After he returned to Cairo, businessman Talaat Harb asked Rafla to work as an assistant to some foreigners from Europe that were working at Studio Misr, a Cairo-based film studio established by Harb.

Rafla continued to work in Studio Misr, until 1936 when the Egyptian Ministry of Education announced they were dispatching Egyptians to France and England in order to learn more about the art of theatre and cinema, including cosmetology. This training was in preparation for the opening of the Egyptian National Theatre Troupe (now the National Theater of Egypt). He studied in France photography, set decoration, and film directing, and upon returning to Egypt he focused on working as a make-up art in the theater for five years. Around 1938, Rafla pivoted to working in make-up for cinema. He did make-up for more than 40 films.

Rafla began his film career in 1942 as an assistant to various film directors such as Ahmed Kamel Morsi, Ibrahim Emara, Abbas Kamel (filmmaker), and Hussein Fawzi (filmmaker). He produced, directed, composed and composed many films, most of them in Egypt and some of them in Lebanon, Turkey, and Nigeria.

== Filmography ==
=== As director ===
- The Doves of Peace (1947), as director
- The Mind is on a Vacation (1947), as director
- Love and Madness (film) (1948)
- The Millionaire, as director
- The Girl from Paris (1950), as director
- The Pretty Mothers-in-law (1953), as director
- Crime and Punishment (1957), as director
- Idol of the Masses (1967), as director
- A Touch of Tenderness (1971), as director

=== As producer ===
- Love and Madness (film) (1948)
- The Road of Hope (1957), as producer
- The River of Love (1960), as producer
- I Will Not Confess (1961), as producer
- The Mamelukes (1965), as producer

=== As screenwriter ===
- Love and Madness (film) (1948) (story, screenplay, and dialogue)
