= Zaki Rostom =

Egyptian actor

Zaki Moharram Mahmoud Rostom زكي محرم مـحـمود رستم
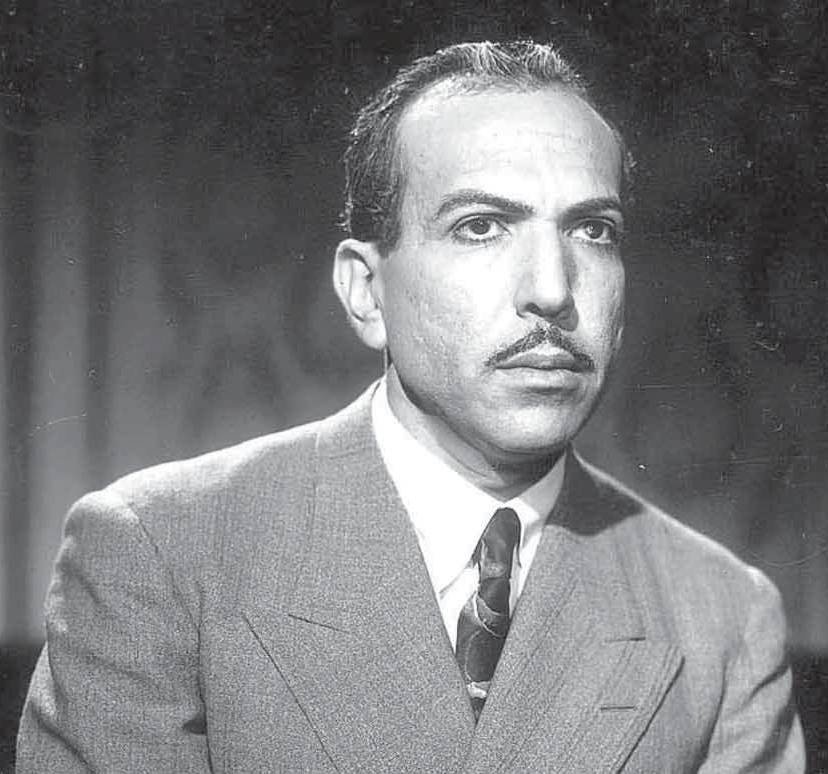
- Zaki Rostom
- Born: Zaki Moharram Mahmoud Rostom; March 5, 1903; Cairo, Egypt
- Died: 15 February 1972 (aged 68); Cairo, Egypt
- Occupation: Actor
- Relatives: Magda El-Khatib (niece)

Zaki Rostom (Arabic: زكي رستم) (1903–1972) was an Egyptian actor. A method actor known for portraying intimidating and often asocial villains, Zaki is regarded as one of the influential and important actors of Egyptian cinema.

== Biography ==
Zaki Rostom was born on March 5, 1903, to an aristocratic family of prominent position in Egypt, where his father and grandfather were Pashas of Egypt, and his grandfather also served in the Egyptian army. His father was appointed minister in the era of Khedive Ismail, and died when Zaki was still a young boy.

He was brought up by a friend of his father, Mustafa Nageeb, the father of the Egyptian artist Soliman Nageeb (Arabic: سليمان نجيب (1892–1955), where a strong relationship started between him and some artists of the theater at that time, including fellow actor Abdel Wareth Assar (1894–1982).

His hobby of acting started when he was a student in the baccalaureate; in 1924 he joined the National theater group, and in 1925 joined the Ramses theater group.

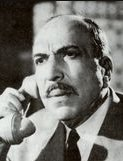
Zaki Rostom

Rostom's best known roles include an aristocrat tyrant husband in the Egyptian adaptation of Anna Karenina; Ezz El Dine Zulficar's The River of Love (1960), a powerful brutal landlord in Youssef Chahine's Struggle in the Valley (1954), a bully merchant opposite Farid Shawki in The Tough (1957), a sneaky drug lord in Pier No. 5 (1957), and the loving father opposite Salah Zulfikar who played the villain role instead in Ana wa Banati (1961).

He was chosen by the Paris Match French magazine in the mid 1940s as one of the best ten international actors.

In the last 10 years of his life he suffered from hearing impairment and severe depression. He lived in isolation and spent his time reading until he suffered a heart attack and died on February 16 of 1972 at the age of 68 years.

== Filmography ==
- Zaynab (1930) .... Hassan
- Dahayat, El (1933) ... a.k.a. The Victims (International: English title)
- Kaferi am khatiatak (1933)... a.k.a. Pay for Your Sins (International: English title)
- El Warda El Bayda (1933)... a.k.a. The White Rose (International: English title)
- El-ittihâm (1934)... a.k.a. The Accusation (International: English title)
- Layla bint el sahara (1937)... a.k.a. Leila, Daughter of the Desert (International: English title)
- El-Azeema (1939)... a.k.a. The Will (International: English title)
- El-charid (1942)... a.k.a. The Wanderer (International: English title)
- El-muttahama (1942)... a.k.a. The Suspect (International: English title)
- Hadamat beyti (1943)... a.k.a. I Ruined My House (International: English title)
- Haza ganahu abi (1945) ... a.k.a. This Was My Father's Crime (International: English title)
- Suq al-Soda', al- (1945) .... Abu Mahmud ... a.k.a. Black Market
- El-hanim (1946)
- Dahaya el madania (1946) ... a.k.a. Victims of Modernism (International: English title)
- Ab, El (1947)... a.k.a. The Father (International: English title)
- Ghurub (1947)... a.k.a. Sunset (International: English title)
- Ana al maadi (1951)... a.k.a. I Am the Past (International: English title)
- Awladi (1952) ... a.k.a. My Children (International: English title)
- Aisha (1953) .... Madbouli (the father)
- Siraa Fil-Wadi (1954) .... Taher Pasha ... a.k.a. Struggle in the Valley ... a.k.a. The Blazing Sky ... a.k.a. The Blazing Sun
- Hub wa demoue (1956)... a.k.a. Love and Tears (International: English title)
- Rasif rakam khamsa (1956) ... a.k.a. Platform No. 5 (International: English title)
- Fatawa, El (1957) ... a.k.a. The Tough (International: English title)
- Emraa fil tarik (1958) ... a.k.a. A Woman on the Road (International: English title)
- Malaak wa Shaytan (1960) ... a.k.a. Angel and Devil (International: English title)
- Aaz el habaieb (1961) ... a.k.a. I Want Love (International: English title)
- Nahr el hub (1961) .... Taher Pasha... a.k.a. The River of Love (International: English title)
- Ana wa Banati (1961) .... Mahmoud... a.k.a Me and My Daughters (International: English title)
- Haram, El (1965) ... a.k.a. The Sin (International: English title)
- Aguazet seif (1967) .... Farid

== See also ==
- Egyptian films of the 1960s
- List of Egyptians
