= Among the Ruins =

1959 film

Among the Ruins بين الأطلال
- Directed by: Ezz El-Dine Zulficar
- Written by: Yusuf Sibai; Mohamed Osman; Ezz El-Dine Zulficar
- Produced by: Salah Zulfikar
- Starring: Faten Hamama; Emad Hamdy; Salah Zulfikar
- Cinematography: Wahid Farid
- Edited by: Albert Naguib
- Production company: Ezz El-Dine Zulficar Films Company
- Release date: November 17, 1959
- Country: Egypt
- Language: Arabic

Among the Ruins (Arabic: بين الأطلال, translit. Bain el Atlal) is a 1959 Egyptian romance film directed by the Egyptian film director Ezz El-Dine Zulficar and produced by the Egyptian film producers; Salah Zulfikar and Ezz El-Dine Zulficar.

The film is based on a novel written by Yusuf Sibai. It stars Faten Hamama, Emad Hamdy and Salah Zulfikar. Hamama received an award for her performance and the film was listed in the Top 100 Egyptian films in 1996.

== Plot ==
Mona (Faten Hamama) is a university student who falls in love with her professor Mahmoud (Emad Hamdy), who is also a gifted writer. Mahmoud proposes to Mona but her mother refuses and Mona marries another man and leaves the country. Years later after she returns, Mona visits a sick Mahmoud in a hospital. Mahmoud expresses his love to Mona as he lies in his deathbed. And Mona’s son Kamal (Salah Zulfikar) falls in love with Mahmoud’s daughter (Sophie Tharwat).

== Cast ==
- Faten Hamama as Mona
- Emad Hamdy as Mahmoud
- Salah Zulfikar as Kamal
- Fouad El-Mohandes as Abdel Moneim
- Sophie Tharwat as Mona Mahmoud
- Rawhiyya Khaled
- Samiha Ayoub
