= The Second Man (1959 film) =

1959 film by Ezz El-Dine Zulficar

- Egyptian Arabic: الرجل الثاني
- Directed by: Ezz El-Dine Zulficar
- Written by: Youssef Gohar; Ezz El-Dine Zulficar
- Produced by: Salah Zulfikar; Ezz El-Dine Zulficar
- Starring: Samia Gamal; Sabah; Salah Zulfikar; Rushdy Abaza
- Cinematography: Wahid Farid
- Edited by: Albert Naguib
- Music by: Andre Ryder
- Production company: Ezz El-Dine Zulficar Films Company
- Distributed by: Al Sharq Films Distribution
- Release date: 24 December 1959 (Egypt)
- Country: Egypt
- Language: Egyptian Arabic

The Second Man is 1959 Egyptian action film written and directed by Ezz El-Dine Zulficar. It features an ensemble cast that includes Samia Gamal, Sabah, Salah Zulfikar and Rushdy Abaza. The film was produced by Salah Zulfikar and Ezz El-Dine Zulficar for Ezz El-Dine Zulfikar Films Company and released in Egypt on December 24, 1959 by Al Sharq Films Distribution.

== Plot ==
Ismat Kazem is the second man in an international gang which is active between Cairo and Beirut. No one actually knows who the first man is, who lives most of his time in a cabaret. Around him is his mistress, the dancer Samra. The leader does not want to recognize his daughter from Samra, and instead attributes her to a bar worker. He falls in love with Lamia, but she ignores his feelings and decides to marry a rich man.

The first man issues an order to kill Ibrahim, Lamia's brother, because he went out of his way, so Lamia reports to the police and asks to know who the killers of her brother are. Here comes the police officer Kamal who impersonates her second brother, Akram, who lives in Brazil, and Lamia returns to the cabaret to work, causing others to Samra. Kamal manages to enter the gang's den as the most honorable brother of Lamia, and while he is there, he begins to feel love for Lamia, and apparently she loves him back. Out of hatred towards Ismat, Samra helps Kamal in his chase to arrest Ismat, but Ismat turns to the first man to smuggle him, but the first man surprises Ismat by eliminating him, as he is the only one he knows and thus represents the greatest danger to him. Then Kamal arrives and manages to arrest the first man red-handed with the killing of Ismat. And Kamal finally wins the love of Lamia.

== Staff ==
- Directed by: Ezz El-Dine Zulficar
- Story and script: Youssef Gohar, Ezz El-Dine Zulficar
- Dialogue: Youssef Gohar
- Cinematography: Waheed Farid
- Editing: Albert Naguib
- Soundtrack: Andre Ryder
- Produced by: Salah Zulfikar, Ezz El-Dine Zulficar
- Executive Producer: Ezz El-Dine Zulficar
- Production studio: Ezz El-Dine Zulficar Films
- Distribution: Al Sharq Films Distribution

== Cast ==
- Samia Gamal: (Samra / Sakina El-Feki)
- Sabah: (Lamia Sukkar)
- Salah Zulfikar: (Officer Kamal / Akram)
- Rushdy Abaza: (Ismat Kazem)
- Salah Nazmi: (Hussam)
- Mahmoud Farag: (Asfour)
- Badr Nofal: (Darwish al-Attar / Dewars)
- Abdul-Ghani Al-Nagdi: (the mayor)
- Qadariyya Qadari: (Qadariyyah)
- Gamil Ezz El-Din: (Akram Sukkar)
- Waza: (the little girl, Mona Darwish)
- Nasr El-Din Mustafa: (Director of Investigations)
- Abdul-Azim Kamel: (Doctor)
- Mohammed Sobeih: (Police man)
- Abdul-Khaleq Salih: (Sherif / First Man)
- Hussein Ismail: (Al-Shawish Muhammad)
- Hassan Hamed: (Camelo)
- Hussein Qandil: (customs officer)
- Abdul Moneim Ismail: (The man of the suit)
- Rashad Hamed: (Mahgoub)
- Nageeb Abdo: (customs officer)
- Sayed Al Arabi: (One of the gangsters)
- Abdel Moneim Bassiouni: (Owner of the autograph)
- Ahmed Ghanem: (The Magician Rabadar Gamahara)
- Toson Moatamed: (Vest in port)
- Mukhtar al-Sayyid: (The autograph man)
- Sherif Hamdi: (Among the gang men)

== Songs ==
All songs performed by Sabah

- 'Thirsty

Written by Fatehi Qora, composed by Mounir Mourad

- Oh, from his eyes.

Written by Fatehi Qora, composed by Mounir Murad

- Tell me aye

Written by Mamoun El-Shennawy, composed by Mohamed El-Mougui
