= I'm the Past =

Ana al-Madi أنا الماضي
- Theatrical poster
- Directed by: Ezzel Dine Zulficar
- Written by: Ezzel Dine Zulficar
- Starring: Faten Hamama; Imad Hamdi; Zaki Rostom; Farid Shawqi
- Release date: 1951
- Running time: 125 minutes
- Country: Egypt
- Language: Arabic

Ana al-Madi (Arabic: أنا الماضي, I'm the Past) is a classic 1951 Egyptian crime film. The film was written and directed by Ezzel Dine Zulficar. It starred Imad Hamdi, Zaki Rostom, Farid Shawqi, and Faten Hamama.

== Plot ==
Hamed is released from prison after serving 20 years for a crime he did not commit. The crime was the murder of his close friend, Kamel. Kamel's murder was the result of an affair that his wife, Elham, was having with another man, Fareed, who was the murderer. Elham covered up for her lover's murder and Hamed was falsely jailed for the murder.

Hamed wants to take his revenge for what Elham has done to his life. He looks for the couple, but he discovers that they have died. The only way to get his revenge would be from their daughter. He starts a relationship with her and marries her. After their marriage, Hamed starts bedeviling and harassing her. He treats her as a crazy woman and an object. One day, she gets pregnant. Hamed's conscience puts a stop to his evil behavior and the emotions of becoming a father overcome him.
