= The River of Love (1960 film) =

1960 film

- VHS cover
- Arabic: نهر الحب
- Directed by: Ezz El-Dine Zulficar
- Written by: Yussef Issa; Ezz El-Dine Zulficar
- Screenplay by: Ezz El-Dine Zulficar
- Based on: Anna Karenina by Leo Tolstoy
- Produced by: Helmy Rafla
- Starring: Faten Hamama; Omar Sharif
- Cinematography: Wahid Farid
- Edited by: Hussein Ahmed
- Music by: Andre Ryder
- Release date: December 12, 1960
- Running time: 120 minutes
- Country: United Arab Republic
- Language: Egyptian Arabic

The River of Love (Arabic: نهر الحب, romanized: Nahr al-Ḥub, Nahr el hob) is a 1960 Egyptian romance film starring Faten Hamama and Omar Sharif. It was directed by Ezz El-Dine Zulficar and based on Leo Tolstoy's 1877 novel, Anna Karenina. The film was listed in the top 100 Egyptian films in 1996.

== Plot ==
Taher Pasha (Zaki Rostom), a wealthy and powerful man, falls in love with Nawal (Faten Hamama) and decides to marry her. She accepts in order to save her brother from jail due to unpaid debts. After their wedding, Nawal's life turns into a miserable one, living lonely in the Pasha's house. She gets pregnant and gives birth to her only child. A young military officer named Khalid (Omar Sharif) falls in love with Nawal, who returns his love.

For months the lovers keep their relationship a secret, until Taher Pasha finds out that his wife might be having an affair. She faces her tyrant husband and demands a divorce, but he refuses. Nawal's brother threatens to publicly reveal Taher's wrongdoings and transgressions to the press if he won't divorce Nawal. Nawal travels with Khalid to Lebanon. Taher Pasha sends some of his people to spy on her and receives pictures clearly showing Nawal with Khalid. Furious, Taher divorces her and keeps custody of their child. Khalid dies in a battle in the war. Nawal returns to Egypt and tries to get her child back, but fails. Despairing and devastated, Nawal commits suicide by binding herself to a railroad.

== Cast ==
- Faten Hamama as Nawal
- Omar Sharif as Khalid
- Zaki Rostom as Taher Pasha
- Omar El-Hariri as Mamdouh
- Zahret El-Ola as Safeya
- Amina Rizk as Fatma Hanim
- Fuad Al Mohandes as Fuad, Khalid's friend
- Soher El Bably as Mervat
