= Shadia =

Egyptian actress/singer (1931–2017)

OSA Shadia
- شادية
- Born: Fatma Ahmad Kamal Shaker فاطمه أحمد كمال شاكر; 8 February 1931; Cairo, Kingdom of Egypt
- Died: 28 November 2017 (aged 86); Cairo, Egypt
- Other names: Idol of the Masses; Guitar of the Arabic Song; The Golden Guitar
- Occupations: Actress; singer
- Years active: 1947–1984
- Spouses: Emad Hamdy (1953–1956); Aziz Fathi (1958–1958); Salah Zulfikar (1964–1970)
- Honours: Order of Sciences and Arts

Fatma Ahmad Kamal Shaker (Arabic: فاطمة أحمد كمال شاكر; 8 February 1931 – 28 November 2017), better known by her stage name Shadia (Arabic: شادية, Shādya), was an Egyptian actress and singer. She was famous for her roles in light comedies and drama in the 1950s and 1960s. She was the third wife of Salah Zulfikar. Shadia was one of the iconic actresses and singers in Egypt and the Middle East region and a symbol of the golden age of Egyptian cinema and is known of her many patriotic songs.

Shadia's films and songs are popular in Egypt and all the Arab world. Critics consider her the most successful comprehensive Egyptian and Arabic artist of all time. Her first appearance in a film was in "Azhar wa Ashwak" (Flowers and Thorns), and her last film was "La Tas'alni Man Ana" (Don't Ask Me Who I Am).

She is also known for her patriotic song "Ya Habibti Ya Masr" (Oh Egypt, My Love.) Her breakthrough leading role came in the 1959 Egyptian film "Al Maraa Al Maghoula" (The Unknown Woman) directed by Mahmoud Zulfikar. Six of her movies are listed in the top 100 Egyptian movies of the 20th century.

In April 2015, Shadia became the first actress to be awarded an honorary doctorate by the Egyptian Academy of Arts. She was given the nickname "Idol of the Masses" following her successful movie "Ma'budet el Gamahir" (Idol of the Masses). Other notable nicknames include "The Guitar of the Egyptian Singing" (Arabic: جيتارة الغناء) and "The Golden Guitar" (Arabic: الجيتارة الذهبية).

== Early life ==
Shadia was born "Fatma Ahmad Kamal Shaker" on 8 February 1931, in Elhelmiyya Elgedida, in Cairo, Egypt, to an Egyptian father Ahmed Kamal Sahker from Sharqia and a mother of Turkish origin. In 1947, she fell in love with an Egyptian officer from Upper Egypt, and was heartbroken by his death during the 1948 war. Shadia had five sisters and brothers. She was the youngest of her sisters and the second youngest among all her siblings. Since her childhood, Shadia loved to sing and was encouraged to pursue music at primary school.

== Career ==
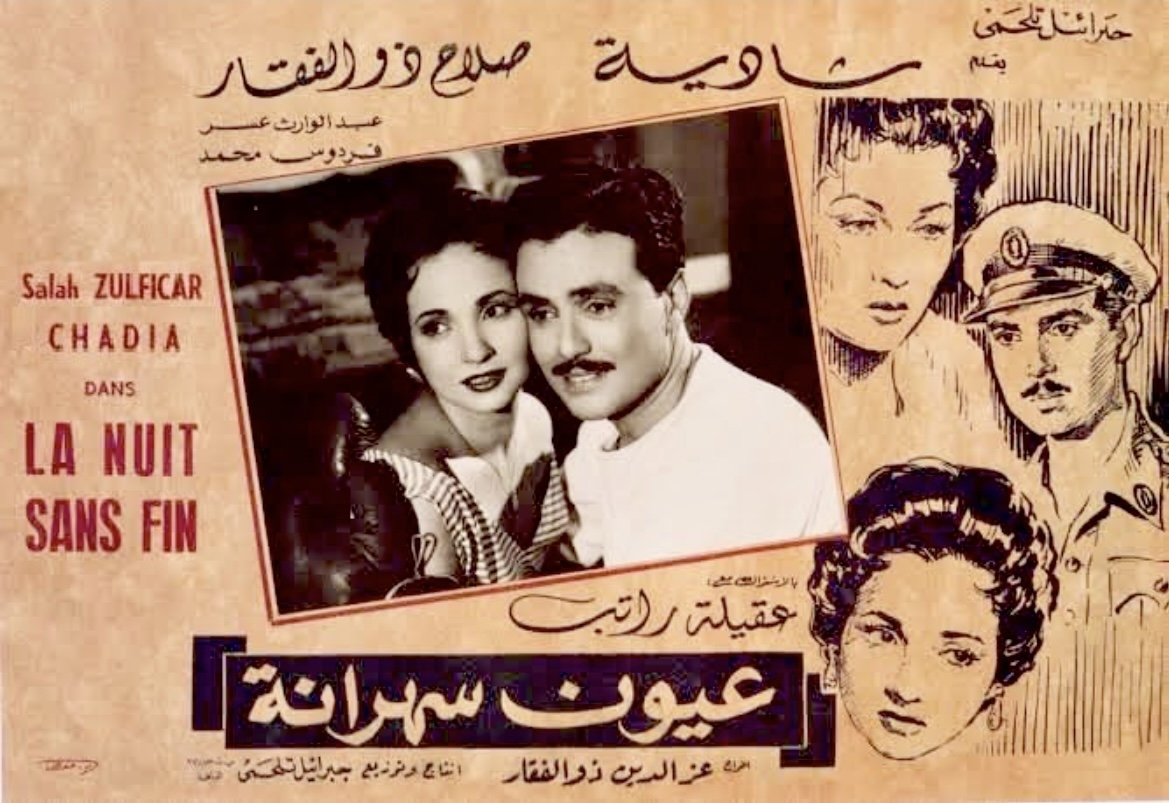
Lobby Card for Wakeful Eyes (1956), with Salah Zulfikar and Shadia

Shaker gave herself the stage name "Shadia", after the name of a newborn of one of her family's friends. She began acting at the age of fifteen. In her heyday during the 1950s and 1960s, Shadia acted in numerous melodramas, romance, and comedy films. However, it was her singing talent that established Shadia as one of the most important Egyptian cinema stars of her era.

Overall, as "Shadia", she performed in more than 100 films. Shadia is credited for acting alongside leading man Salah Zulfikar in his film debut, "Oyoun Sahrana" (Wakeful Eyes, 1956). Later, she paired with Zulfikar in six films, forming a famous duet, achieving major commercial and critical success, and becoming an Egyptian cinema classic. She also starred in more than 30 films with the actor Kamal El Shennawy, and sang opposite Farid El Atrash and Abdel Halim Hafez, such as in "Ma'boudat El Gamaheer" (The People's Idol, 1967). She appeared with Faten Hamama in Ezz El-Dine Zulfikar's "Mawe'd Ma'a El Hayah" (Appointment with Life, 1954), and in "El Mar'a El Maghula" (The Unknown Woman, 1959) by Mahmoud Zulfikar, she played the role of Fatma in a heavy melodrama.

Other films she starred in include "El les we El Kelab" (The Thief and the Dogs, 1962) with Shoukry Sarhan, where she played the role of a prostitute for the first time. She starred in comedy roles in films such as "El Zouga raqam 13" (Wife Number 13, 1962). She also starred alongside Salah Zulfikar in the romantic drama "Aghla Min Hayati" (Dearer than My Life, 1965), and the film was a success and it turned out to be a romantic classic in Egyptian cinema and the two main characters of Ahmed and Mona became a symbol of love and affection among Egyptians.

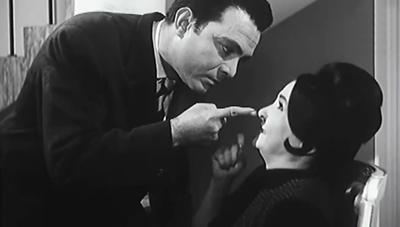
With Salah Zulfikar in My Wife, the Director General (1966)

Her famous trilogy alongside Salah Zulfikar; "Merati Modir 'Am " (My Wife, the Director General, 1966), "Karamat Zawgaty" (My Wife's Dignity, 1967) and "Afrit Merati" (My Wife's Goblin, 1968), were huge successes. Shadia was often cast in cunning and cheeky roles, however, she also played serious roles, such as in Salah Zulfikar Films production; "Shey Min El Khouf" (A Taste of Fear, 1969) and "Uyoon Sahranah" (Wakeful Eyes, 1956) by Ezz El-Dine Zulfikar and "El Tareeq" (The Road, 1964) based on a book by Naguib Mahfouz, and "Lamset Hanan" (A Toutch of Tenderness, 1971), her last film opposite Salah Zulfikar.

Shadia performed in the 1985 stage version of "Raya and Sakina", which was based on the 1953 film and true story of two Alexandrian serial killers, directed by Salah Abu Seif. She produced two films, and appeared in several films in Japan.

As a singer, Shadia was called "the voice of Egypt". During hard and war times, she was famous for her Egyptian patriotic songs, especially "Ya Habibti Ya Masr" (Oh Egypt, My Love) and "Aqwa Mn El Zaman" (Stronger Than Time). She participated in many operettas about Egypt and the Arab world along with other Egyptian and Arabic singers, including: "Al Watan Al Akbar" (The Great Nation), "El Geel El Sa'ed" (The Rising Generation), and "Soot El Gamaheer" (The Voice of the Masses). Her mega hit song "Ya Habibti Ya Masr" (Oh Egypt, My Love), was considered one of the best patriotic songs ever. During a TV-interview, Shadia said regarding her famous patriotic song: "When I am singing to my homeland, it is even way more romantic and more honest than any romantic song. Here I am singing to my home, my land. There was a period when Egypt's name was erased (Nasser's era), Egypt’s name will never get erased from our hearts". After almost 25 years of retirement, Shadia's song became an anthem of the Egyptian Revolution of 2011.

Upon returning from the premiere of "Raya and Sakina", Shadia stated that she gave serious thought that night to the idea of repentance. The following morning, she informed her producers that she wanted no part in the play from then on, but eventually promised to finish her work when they insisted that she do so. Thereafter, Shadia retired from the film and music industry, and went on a Umrah to Mecca, where she met the popular Egyptian Azhari scholar Sheikh El Shaarawy. Her meeting with El-Shaarawy influenced Shadia to reach her final decision to start wearing the hijab.

=== Retirement ===
Shadia retired at the age of 50, citing the reason for her retirement as religious. She explained that she had been through many hard periods and rough circumstances throughout her life including struggling with cancer and depression that had veered her from her career. She decided to dedicate the rest of her life to caring for orphan children, stating that was her life's greatest joy. She also donated to charities, a decision she said she never once hesitated to make.

== Personal life ==
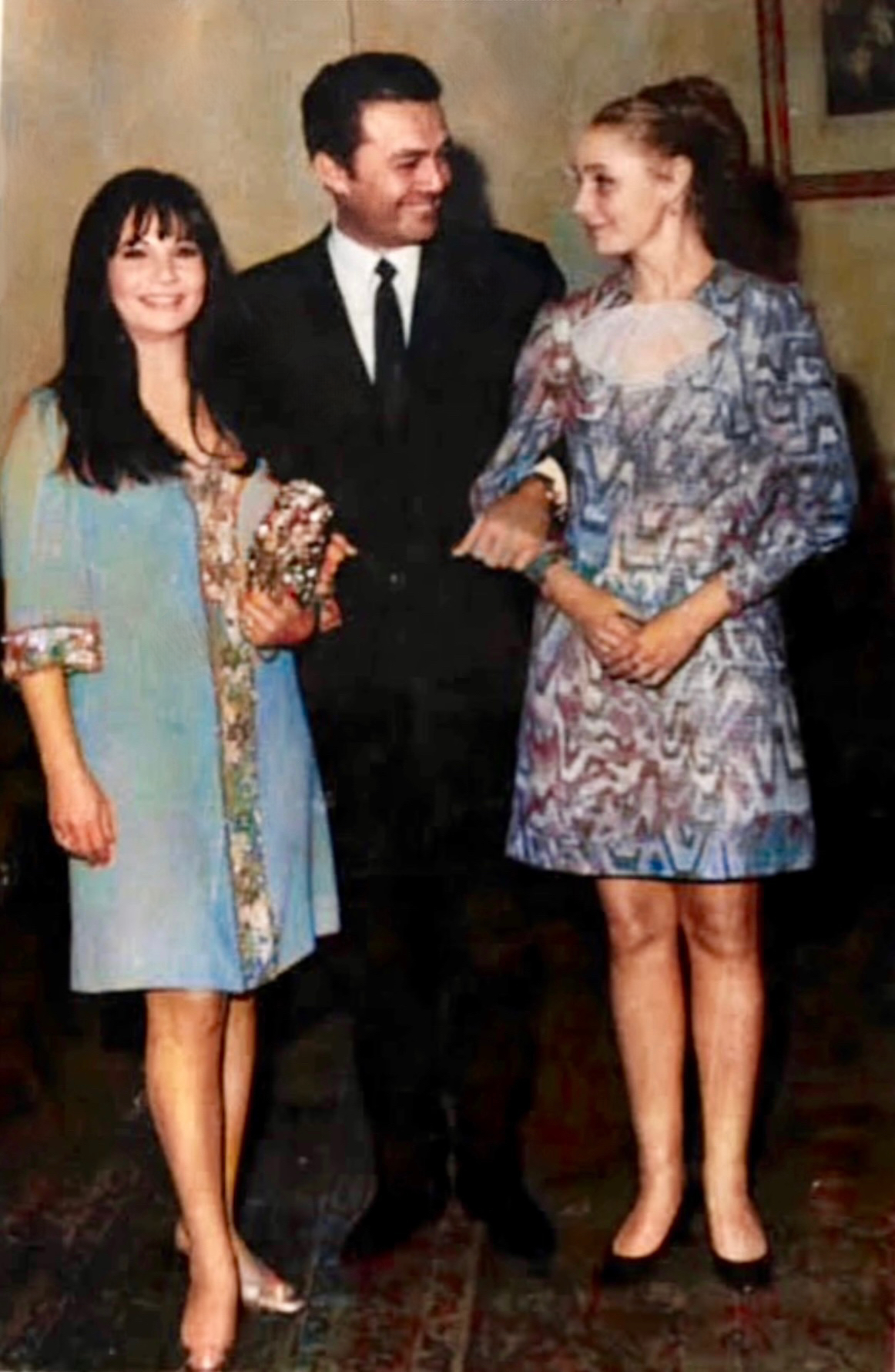
Shadia with her husband Salah Zulfikar and a Russian actress at a cinematic event for A Taste of Fear in Semiramis InterContinental Hotel, Cairo in 1969

Shadia fell in love with an army officer who was killed during the battles of the 1948 Palestine War. Years later, In 1953, she was married to actor Emad Hamdy. This marriage lasted for 3 years and ended with divorce on good terms. In 1958, Shadia married Aziz Fathi, who was a radio engineer. He was several years younger than Shadia, and it did not take long until problems arose between Shadia and her husband. She filed a lawsuit that continued for a long time in courts and was sentenced to divorce after a marriage that lasted 3 years.

Shadia's third and final marriage came after a highly publicized love story with actor and producer Salah Zulfikar. She fell in love with Zulfikar in 1964 while filming Aghla Min Hayati (1965) and they married in the same year. Zulfikar, who was a box-office star, shared the lead with Shadia in highly successful ventures mid-1960s. In one of her press interviews, she stated that he was the love of her life and he was the only man with whom she wished to have children. Unfortunately, she became pregnant three times and suffered a miscarriage each time. This turned out with depression though Zulfikar who already had children from his first marriage, tried to help her overcome her depression and produced A Taste of Fear (1969) with Shadia in the lead, the film turned out to be one of her cinematic masterpieces. Her depression lead to the end of this marriage and they got divorced around 1970. Shadia never remarried after Zulfikar.

== Illness and death ==
Shadia was hospitalised on 4 November 2017 after suffering a massive stroke in Cairo. She was placed under intensive care. Her nephew, Khaled Shaker, said during a televised phone conversation that she recovered from the stroke and could identify her relatives and the people around her. He added, however, that her illness was complicated by pneumonia, despite her recovery. Shadia's condition stabilised on 9 November, and President Abdel Fattah el-Sisi visited her that day at Al-Galaa Hospital. Shaker later said that the first words she spoke after recovering were "I want to go home", but had speech difficulties in general.

On 28 November, Shadia died from respiratory failure caused by the pneumonia.

== Tribute ==
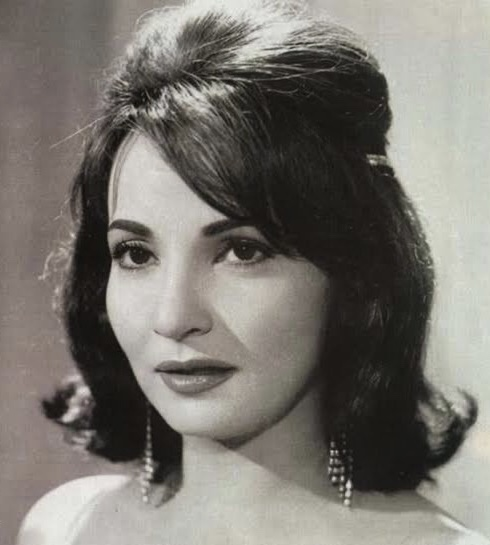
Shadia, c. 1961

On 8 February 2021 Google celebrated her 90th birthday with a Google Doodle. The Doodle was displayed in Egypt, Palestine and Sweden.

== Filmography ==
Year	Title	Egyptian Arabic title
1947	Flowers And Thorns	Azhar W Ashwak أزهار و أشواك
1947	Mind in Holiday	El Aql Fi Agazah العقل فى اجازه
1947	Pigeon Of Peace	Hamamet El Salam حمامة السلام
1948	Justice Of Heaven	'Adl El Sama عدل السماء
1948	The Soul and the Body	El Ruh W El Gasad الروح و الجسد
1949	Speech Of People	Kalam El Nas كلام الناس
1949	Nadia	Nadia ناديه
1949	Owner Of Millims	Sahebat El Malalim صاحبة الملاليم
1949	Eve Of Feast	Lilet El Id ليلة العيد
1950	The Hero	El Batal البطل
1950	An Hour for Your Heart	Sa'ah L Qalbak ساعه لقلبك
1950	The Seventh Wife	El Zogah El Sab'ah الزوجه السابعه
1950	Nothing Dice	Ma'leshsh Ya Zahr معلش يا زهر
1950	People Were Unjust To Me	Zalamuni El Nas ظلمونى الناس
1950	Days of My Youth	Ayam Shababi أيام شبابى
1951	Busy with Not Me	Mashghul B Gheri مشغول بغيرى
1951	Eve Of Wedding	Lilet El Hennah ليلة الحنه
1951	Mister Lion	El Sab' Afandi السبع أفندى
1951	Earphone Of Telephone	Sama'et El Telephone سماعة التليفون
1951	In Love Together	F El Hawa Sawa فى الهوا سوا
1951	Storm in Spring	Asefah F El Rabi عاصفه فى الربيع
1951	The Caravan Moves	El Qafela Tasir القافله تسير
1951	My Children	Awladi أولادي
1951	My Mother-in-Law Is An Atomic Bomb	Hamati Qonbelah Zariyyah حماتى قنبله ذريه
1951	To Whom I Complain?	Ashki l Min أشكى لمين
1951	World Is Sweet	El Donya Helwah الدنيا حلوه
1951	Patience Is Well	El Sabr Gamil الصبر جميل
1951	Dew Drops	Qatr El Nada قطر الندى
1952	Hopes	Amal آمال
1952	The Killer Mother	El Omm El Qatelah الأم القاتله
1952	Home of Embezzler	Bit El Nattash بيت النتاش
1952	Anger Of Parents	Ghadab El Waledain غضب الوالدين
1952	Love Has No Remedy	El Hawa Malush Dawa الهوا ملوش دوا
1952	Good Comer	Boshret Khir بشرة خير
1952	The Unlucky One	Qalil El Bakht قليل البخت
1952	Girl Of Shore	Bent al Shati بنت الشاطئ
1952	Coming Goodness	Qaddam El Khir قدم الخير
1952	My Life Is You	Hayati Enta حياتى انت
1952	I Wronged My Soul	Zalamt Rohi ظلمت روحى
1952	Fault Of Father	Ghaltet Abb غلطة أب
1952	Down With Imperialism	Yasqot El Este'mar يسقط الاستعمار
1953	Your Luck This Week	Hazzak Haza El Esbu حظك هذا الاسبوع
1953	Me and my Lover	Ana W Habibi انا و حبيبى
1953	Testimony O People	Eshhadu Ya Nas اشهدو يا ناس
1953	Between Two Hearts	Bin Qalbin بين قلبين
1953	Right Word	Kelemet Haqq كلمة حق
1953	Your Tongue Is Your Horse	Lesanak Hosanak لسانك حصانك
1953	The Bread-Seller	Baeat El Khobz بائعة الخبز
1953	The Honest Thief	El Less el Sharif اللص الشريف
1953	I'm on My Own	Malish Hadd ماليش حد
1954	Appointment with Life	Maw'ed Ma' el Hayah موعد مع الحياه
1954	Forter Than Love	Aqwa Men al Hobb أقوى من الحب
1954	Adventures of Ismail Yasin	Moghamarat Ismail Yasin مغامرات اسماعيل ياسين
1954	I Am The Love	Ana El Hobb انا الحب
1954	Daughters Of Eve	Banat Hawa بنات حواء
1954	Daughter Of Neighbors	Bent el Giran بنت الجيران
1954	Horor Of Girl	Sharaf El Bent شرف البنت
1954	Injustice Is Forbidden	El Zolm Haram الظلم حرام
1954	Don't Think	Ewa Tefakkar إوعا تفكر
1954	Help Me With Employee Of Marriage	Elhaquni B El Mazun الحقونى بالمأذون
1954	Women Can't Lie	El Setat Ma Yerafush Yekdebu الستات مايعرفوش يكدبوا
1954	A Night of my Life	Lilah Men Omri ليله من عمرى
1955	Melody Of Loyality	Lahn El Wafa لحن الوفاء
1955	The Shore of Memories	Shati El Zekrayat شاطئ الذكريات
1956	The Leech	Shabab Emraah شباب امرأة
1956	Farewell at Dawn	Wada Fi El Fagr وداع فى الفجر
1956	Spring Of Love	Rabi El Hobb ربيع الحب
1956	Wakeful Eyes	Oyun Sahranah عيون سهرانه
1956	Dalila	Dalilah دليله
1956	Farewell Your Love	Wadat Hobbak ودعت حبك
1957	Lawahez	Lawahez لواحظ
1957	You Are My Lover	Enta Habibi انت حبيبى
1958	Fiery Love	Hobb men Nar حب من نار
1958	Fault of My Lover	Ghaltet Habibi غلطة حبيبى
1958	The Escaper	El Harebah الهاربه
1958	Hearts Of Virgins	Qolub El 'Azara قلوب العذارى
1959	Pity My Heart	Erham Qalbi إرحم قلبى
1959	Nest Of Love	Esh al Gharam عش الغرام
1959	The Unknown Woman	El Marah El Maghulah المرأه المجهوله
1960	Agony of Love	Lawat El Hobb لوعة الحب
1960	Together Forever	Ma'an Ela Al Abad معاً إلى الأبد
1961	Don't Remember Me	La Tazkorini لا تذكرينى
1961	The Schoolgirl	Al Telmizah التلميذه
1962	Wife Number 13	El Zugah Raqam 13 الزوجة رقم 13
1962	Forget The World	Ensa El Donya إنسا الدنيا
1962	A Woman in Whirlpool	Emraah Fi Dawwamah امرأه فى دوامه
1962	Chased by the Dogs	El Less W El Kelab اللص و الكلاب
1962	The Miracle	Al Mo'gezah المعجزه
1963	On the Banks of the Nile	Ala Defaf El Nil على ضفاف النيل
1963	Cairo at Night	Al Qahera Fi El Lil القاهره فى الليل
1963	El Madaqq	Zoqaq al Madaq زقاق المدق
1963	Extreme Joy	Montaha el Farah منتها الفرح
1964	Thousand And One Nights	Alf Lilah E Lilah ألف ليله و ليله
1964	The Road	El Tariq الطريق
1965	Dearer Than My Life	Aghla Min Hayati أغلا من حياتى
1966	My Wife, the Director General	Merati Modir Am مراتى مدير عام
1967	Idol Of Public Masses	Mabudet El Gamahir معبودة الجماهير
1967	My Wife's Dignity	Karamet Zawgati كرامة زوجتى
1968	My Wife's Goblin	Afrit Merati عفريت مراتى
1969	A Taste of Fear	Shi Men El Khuf شيء من الخوف
1969	Half An Hour Marriage	Nos Saah Gawaz نص ساعه جواز'
1969	Miramar	Miramar ميرامار
1970	Tailor Of Ladies	Khayyat El Sayyidat خياط للسيدات
1970	We Don't Plant Thorn	Nahno La Nazra El Shuk نحن لا نزرع الشوك
1971	Touch Of Tenderness	Lamset Hanan لمسة حنان
1972	Lights Of City	Adwa El Madinah أضواء المدينه
1973	Double Face	Zat El Waghin ذات الوجهين
1974	Lover Woman	Emraah Asheqah امرأه عاشقه
1974	The Fugitive	El Hareb الهارب
1974	Forbidden Memories	Raghabat Mamnuah رغبات ممنوعه
1976	Waves Without Shore	Amwag Bela Shati امواج بلا شاطئ
1979	Doubt O My Lover	El Shakk Ya Habibi الشك يا حبيبى
1981	Valley Of Memories	Wadi El Zekrayat وادى الذكريات
1984	Don't Ask Me Who I am	La Tasalni Mann Ana لا تسألنى من انا
