= Wakeful Eyes =

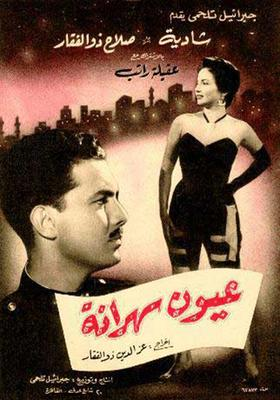
- Film poster
- Egyptian Arabic: عيون سهرانة
- Directed by: Ezz El-Dine Zulficar
- Written by: Youssef Eissa
- Screenplay by: Ezz El-Dine Zulficar
- Produced by: Gabriel Talhamy
- Starring: Salah Zulfikar; Shadia; Ferdoos Mohammed
- Cinematography: Wadeed Serry
- Edited by: Mohammed Abbas
- Music by: Andre Ryder
- Production company: Gabriel Talhamy Films
- Distributed by: Gabriel Talhamy Films
- Release date: October 1, 1956 (Egypt)
- Running time: 120 minutes
- Country: Egypt
- Language: Egyptian Arabic

Wakeful Eyes (Egyptian Arabic: عيون سهرانة, translit: Uyoon Sahranah, aliases: Sleepless Night) is a 1956 Egyptian romantic drama directed by Ezz El-Dine Zulficar. It stars Salah Zulfikar and Shadia. It marks Salah Zulfikar's film debut. Wakeful Eyes premiered on September 30, 1956 at Radio Theatre in Cairo, and was released on October 1 in Egypt. The film received largely positive reviews praising the performances of Zulfikar and Shadia, the cinematography, and the musical score.

== Plot ==
A respectable man, "Saber Effendi," frequently changes residences and never stays long in one place with his daughter Fatima. He tells her that he works at a newspaper printing press, hates mixing with people, and takes pity on her from temptation. In their new home, "Fatma" meets the neighbor's son, “Salah” (Salah Zulfikar), who is in his final year at the Police Academy. The two fall in love, and Salah asks her father for her hand in marriage, where he works in the newspaper.

Fatima later discovers that her father does not work at the newspaper. When she confronts him, he reveals that he had been a prosecution secretary. He also reveals that he once had an older daughter who took her own life after being abandoned by the man who seduced her, naming him before she died. Fearing arrest, he fled with his remaining child to Cairo, where he changed his identity.

== Cast ==
- Salah Zulfikar as Salah
- Shadia as Fatma
- Ferdoos Mohammed as Salah's mother
- Aqeela Rateb as Ragaa
- Abdul Warith Aser as Saber Effendi
- Fouad El-Mohandes as Salah's friend
- Adly Kasseb as Police Officer
- Abdel Rehim El Zorqani as the lawyer
- Khairiya Ahmed as The Boxer's Relative
- Mukhtar Al-Sayed as Al-Ahram Employee
- Afaf Shaker as Salwa, Saber's daughter
- Abbas Al-Daly as Cabaret Employee
- Mohamed Shawky as Bar Customer
- Ali Abdel Aal as Bar Owner
- Zaki Mohamed Hassan as Patrol Officer
- Badr Noufal as Officer
- Abdel Hamid Badawi as Police Informant
- Mohamed El-Deeb as The victim
