= Emad Hamdy =

Egyptian actor

- عماد حمدي
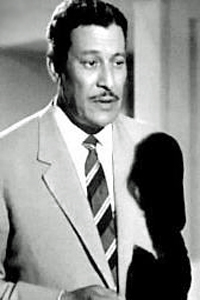
- Emad Hamdy, 1962
- Born: November 25, 1909; Suhaj, Khedivate of Egypt
- Died: January 28, 1984 (aged 74); Cairo, Egypt
- Other name: Imad Hamdi
- Occupation: Actor
- Years active: 1945–1984
- Spouses: Fatheyya Sherif (divorced) Shadia (m. 1953; div. 1956) Nadia El-Guindy (m. 1962; div. 1975)
- Children: 1 son

Emad Hamdy (Arabic: عماد حمدي, ‘Imād Ḥamdī; November 25, 1909 – January 28, 1984) also known as Imad Hamdi, was an Egyptian actor. He was married to the Egyptian actress Shadia between 1953 and 1956. And between 1962 and 1975 he was married to the Egyptian actress Nadia El Guindy, and they had one son.

== Filmography ==
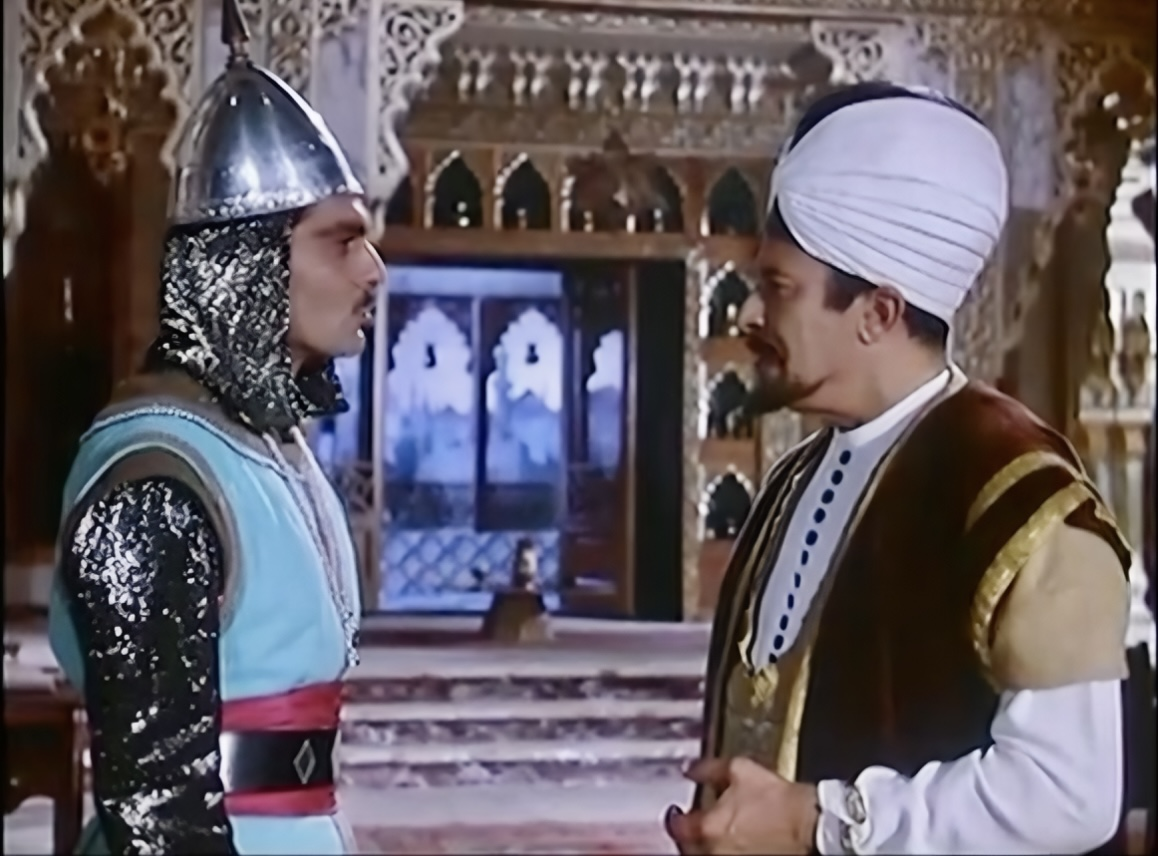
Hamdy and Omar Sharif in The Mamelukes (1965)

- Al Souk Al Sawdaa (The Black Market) 1945.
- Garam Badaweyya 1946.
- Dayman Fe Qalbi (Always in my Heart) 1946.
- Azhar W Ashwak 1947.
- Al Tadheya Al Kobra 1947.
- Layt Al Shabab 1948.
- Al Wageb (Duty) 1948.
- Shamshon Al Gabbar 1948.
- Al Bayt Al Kebeer (The Big House) 1949.
- Sitt al-Bayt 1949.
- Al Sagena Raqam 17 1949.
- Al Saqr (The Hawk) 1950.
- Demaa Fel Saharaa (Blood in the Desert) 1950.
- Ana al-Madi (I am the Past) 1951.
- Mashgool Beghery 1951.
- Wadaan Ya Gharamy (Goodbye my love) 1951.
- Samaet Al Telephon 1951.
- Zohoor Al Eslam 1951.
- Ashky Lemeen 1951.
- Men Gher Wadaa 1951.
- Sayyedet Al Qetar (The Lady of the Train) 1952.
- Al Manzel Raqam 13 (The House Number 13) 1952.
- Baed Al Wadaa 1953.
- Zalamony Al Habayeb 1953.
- Abeed Al Mal (The Slaves of Money) 1953.
- Qetar Al Neel (The Train of the Nile) 1953.
- Maqtoob Ala Al Gebeen 1953.
- Nesaa Bela Regal (Women without Men) 1953.
- Hokm Al Zaman 1953.
- Al Leqaa Al Akheer 1953.
- Hobb Fel Zalam 1953.
- Wafaa 1953.
- Al Herman 1953.
- Aqwa Men Al Hobb (More Strong than Love) 1954.
- Aathar Fel Remal (Traces in Sand) 1954.
- Raqset Al Wadaa 1954.
- Lemeen Hawak 1954.
- Injustice Is Forbidden (Arabic: الظلم حرام, lit. 'El Zolm Haram') 1954.
- Aziza 1954.
- Sharaf Al Bent 1954.
- Gonon Al Hobb (The Madness of Love) 1954.
- Hayah Aw Mout 1954.
- Lelah Men Omri 1954.
- Maw`ed Ma` al-Sa`ada 1954.
- Enny Rahela (I am Leaving) 1955.
- Allah Maana 1955.
- Shadea Al Zekrayat 1955.
- Katalt Zawgaty (I killed my Wife) 1955.
- Mawed Garam 1956.
- Hobb W Eadam 1956.
- Lan Abqi Abadan 1957.
- Ard Al Ahlam (The Land of Dreams) 1957.
- Al Hobb Al Azeem 1957.
- La Anam (I don't Sleep) 1957.
- Ana W Qalbi 1957.
- Hatta Naltaqy (Until We Meet) 1958.
- Ghareeba (Strange) 1958.
- Mogrem Fe Aghaza 1958.
- Maa Al Ayyam 1958.
- Al Zawga Al Azraa 1958.
- Rahmah Men Al Samaa 1958.
- Tooba 1958.
- Gareemet Hobb (A Love Crime) 1959.
- Al Maraa Al Maghoola (The Unknown Woman) 1959.
- Erham Hobby 1959.
- Qalb Men Zahab 1959.
- Bain el Atlal 1959.
- Segn Al Azaraa 1959.
- Sakhret Al Hobb 1959.
- Akher Man Yaalam 1959.
- Qalb Yahtereq (A Burning Heart) 1959.
- Al Sabeha Fel Nar 1959.
- Al Mabrook 1959.
- Huda 1959.
- Inny Attahem (I accuse) 1960.
- Woman's Secret 1960.
- The Mamelukes 1965.
- The Glass Sphinx 1967.
- Khan el khalili 1967.
- The Nile and the Life 1968.
- My Wife's Goblin 1968.
- The Splendor of Love 1968.
- The Man who lost his Shadow 1968.
- Abi foq al-Shagara 1969.
- Chitchat on the Nile 1971.
- The Other Man 1973.
- Searching for a Scandal 1973.
- In Summer We Must Love 1974.
- Where Is My Mind? 1974.
- The Guilty 1975.
- Karnak 1975.

== See also ==
- List of Egyptian films of the 1960s
- List of Egyptians
