= Appointment with Happiness =

1954 film by Ezzel Dine Zulficar

- Poster
- Directed by: Ezz El-Dine Zulficar
- Written by: Ezz El-Dine Zulficar; Yussef Issa
- Produced by: Ezz El-Dine Zulficar • Faten Hamama
- Starring: Faten Hamama; Imad Hamdi
- Release date: 27 December 1954
- Country: Egypt
- Language: Arabic

Appointment with Happiness (Arabic: موعد مع السعادة, translit. Maw`ed Ma` al-Sa`adah) is a 1954 Egyptian romance/drama film directed by Ezz El-Dine Zulficar. It starred Imad Hamdi and Faten Hamama. This film received an award from the Egyptian Catholic Centre. The film portrays the life of a woman who is raped and struggles to raise her daughter.

== Plot ==
In the Buheirat rural area, lives Ehsan (Faten Hamama) with her father (Abdel Waress Assar) who tends and takes care of a rich family's house. In his breaks, her father usually goes hunting with his friends. In the house, Ehsan, who is usually left alone with the rich man's son, Mamdouh (Imad Hamdi), falls in love with him, but he doesn't share her love. This man notices her beauty and he eventually falls in love with her, only secretly.

One day, he arrives home drunk. He assaults and rapes her. Weeks later, she discovers that she became pregnant, but decides not to reveal that to her father. Instead, she travels to Cairo, changes her name to Amal, and months later, she gives birth to a daughter (Nadia Zulficar). Years later, Ehsan (Amal) graduates as a nurse, and Mamdouh, who had traveled to Europe to complete his studies, graduates as a doctor.

He returns to Cairo to work in a hospital, where luck and coincidence brings him and her together, except he does not recognize her. A love relationship starts between the two. Ehsan's father learns of her location and travels to see his missing daughter. Meanwhile, Ehsan reveals the truth to Mamdouh, and both agree to marry each other. The father arrives to find his daughter has married a man and started a family.

== Cast ==
- Faten Hamama as Ehsan/Amal (when she moved to the city)
- Imad Hamdi as Mamdouh, a doctor
- Hussein Riad as
- Abdel Waress Assar as the father
- Nadia Zulfacar as Ehsan's daughter
