= Egyptian Catholic Center for Cinema Festival =

Annual film festival in Egypt

Egyptian Catholic Center for Cinema Festival مهرجان المركز الكاثوليكي للسينما
- Location: Cairo Catholic Center, Cairo, Egypt
- Established: 2 May 1952; 73 years ago
- Awards: Film Leadership Award
- Artistic director: Butrus Daniel
- Language: Egyptian Arabic

The Egyptian Catholic Center for Cinema Festival is an annual film festival held in Cairo, Egypt. Founded in 1952, it is the oldest film festival in Egypt, Africa, and the Middle East. The festival only awards Egyptian films that are distinguished by their high artistic level and whose ideas and topics revolve around issues that concern and benefit society and have a positive impact on its audience.

The festival is hosted by the Cairo Catholic Center. The awards include the Film Leadership Award and the Artistic Creativity Award.

== Overview ==
The Egyptian Catholic Center Film Festival has its own specific criteria for selecting films. It chooses films that promote virtue, do not corrupt souls, and at the same time possess artistry and beauty in their performance. The festival is interested in films with moral content. What distinguishes the festival and gives it its uniqueness is the moral criterion it has set for selecting films participating in the competition, which is that the film must carry human and moral values, which means excluding any film, regardless of its artistic level, if it contains any violation of human moral values.

The festival does not object to films containing sexual scenes. Furthermore, the festival does not accept films that mock religions, support one political party or ideology against another, or attack public officials. Father Boutros Daniel, artistic director of the festival, emphasized that the festival's sole aim is to convey a message to society that promotes humanity and discourages ridicule or belittling others.

== Awards ==
- Best Film
- Best Director
- Best Screenplay
- Best Actress in a leading role
- Best Actor in a leading role
- Best Actress in a supporting role
- Best Actor in a supporting role
- Best Cinematography
- Best Editing
- Best Original Score
- Special Jury Award

== See also ==
- List of Egyptian film festivals
