= Rushdy Abaza =

Egyptian actor (1926–1980)

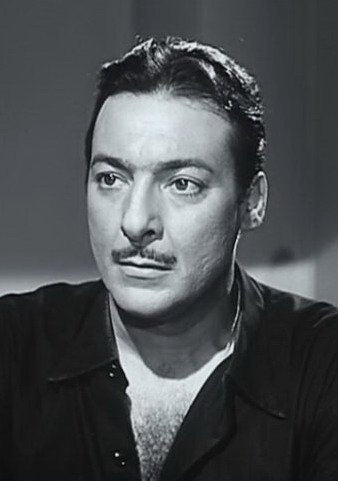
- Born: Rushdy Saeed Baghdadi Abaza; 3 August 1926; Zagazig, Sharqia, Kingdom of Egypt
- Died: 27 July 1980 (aged 53); Cairo, Egypt
- Education: Collège Saint Marc, Alexandria
- Years active: 1948–1980
- Spouses: Tahiya Karioka; Barbara; Samia Gamal; Sabah; Nabila Abaza
- Children: 1
- Family: Abaza family
- Honours: Order of Sciences and Arts

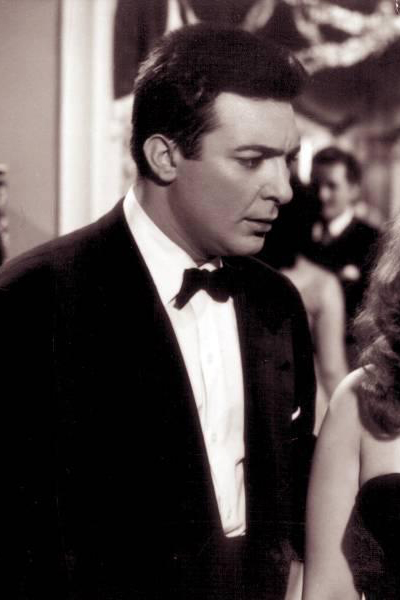
Rushdy Abaza

Rushdy Saeed Baghdadi Abaza (Arabic: رشدي سعيد بغدادي أباظة, romanized: Rushdī Saʿīd Baghdādī ʾAbāẓah; 3 August 1926 – 27 July 1980) was an Egyptian film and television actor. He was considered one of the most charming actors in the Egyptian film industry and is one of the most famous. He died of brain cancer at the age of 53.

Rushdy Abaza is "widely considered one of the greatest names in the history of Arab cinema", with no less than 150 movies to his name.

== Family ==
Rushdy Abaza was born in Sharqia, Egypt, to an Italian mother, Teresa Luigi, and an Egyptian father, Saïd Abaza, belonging to one of Egypt's most well-known families, the Abaza family, who are of maternal-Circassian heritage. He had difficulty at the start because "[acting] was not allowed in ...[his] aristocratic family...and his father and the entire Abaza family strongly objected ...[but] he insisted."

He is the best known Abaza family member and a household name in the Arab world due to the number of films he acted in that remain popular throughout the Arab world.

Rushdy attended school at Collège Saint Marc in Alexandria. Through his father's side he had three half-sisters, Ragaa, Mounira, Zeinab and one half-brother, Fekri (an actor). Through his mother's side, he had one half-brother, Hamed. His only child is a daughter, Qismat (Eismat).

== Marriages ==
- Tahiya Karioka, Egyptian actress and dancer
- Barbara, American mother of his only child, Qismat
- Samia Gamal, famous Egyptian dancer (his longest marriage)
- Sabah, famous Lebanese singer
- Nabila Abaza

== Filmography ==
He appeared in more than 100 films from 1948 until 1980; the year of his death.

1948

- El-Millionaira El-Saghira (also known as The Small Millionaire)

1949

- Zou El-Waghein (a.k.a. The Man with Two Faces)

1950

- Emraa Menn Nar (a.k.a. A Woman of Fire)

1951

- Awlad El shareh
- Amina

1952

- El-Osta Hassan (a.k.a. Hassan the Craftsman)
- El-Montasser (a.k.a. The Conqueror)
- Awladi (a.k.a. My Children)

1953

- Shamm El-Nesseem (a.k.a. The Spring Festival)
- Mouamara (a.k.a. Conspiracy)

1954

- Valley of the Kings - Robed Man (uncredited)
- Gaaluni Mogremann (a.k.a. They Made Me a Murderer)
- Erham Domouie

1955

- Fortune carrée (a.k.a. Square Fortune)
- Enni Rahhela (a.k.a. I Depart)
- Hayah Aw Moot (a.k.a. Life or Death)
- Bahr Elgharam (a.k.a. "Sea of Love'"')
- Arayess Fel-Mazad (a.k.a. Brides for Auction)

1956

- Mawed Gharam
- The Ten Commandments
- Dalila
- Mann al-Qattel? (a.k.a. Who Is the Murderer?)
- Ezzay Ansak (a.k.a. How Would I Forget You)
- Ismaeel Yassin fel-Boliss (a.k.a. Ismaeel Yassin in the Police)
- Bahr al-Gharam (a.k.a. Sea of Love)

1957

- Tamr Henna (a.k.a. Tamarind) - Hassan
- Rodda Qalbi
- La Anam - Samir
- Port Said
- Lan Abki Abadan (a.k.a. I Shall Never Weep)

1958

- Jamila, the Algerian (a.k.a. Jamila Buhreid) - Bigeard
- Toggar al-Moat (a.k.a. Death Merchants) - Ra'oof
- Tareeq al-Ammal
- Soultan (1958)
- Emraa fel-Tareeq (a.k.a. A Woman on the Road)
- Qoloob al-Azara (a.k.a. Hearts of the Virgins)

1959

- El rajul el thani
- Seraa Fel-Nil
- Samraa Sina (a.k.a. The Brunette of Sinai)
- Rehla ilal kamar
- Maleesh Gherak (a.k.a. I Have None But You) - Fathi
- Katia tarik
- Bafakkar Felli Nassini (a.k.a. Thinking of Who Forgot Me)
- Ana Baree'a (a.k.a. I am Innocent)
- Qatte' Tareeq (a.k.a. The Highwayman)

1960

- Malaak wa Shaytan (a.k.a. Angel and Devil) - Ezzat
- Ana wa Ommi (a.k.a. My Mother and I)
- Al-Moraheqat - Adel
- Ya Habeebi (a.k.a. My Beloved)
- Nehayat al-Tareeq (a.k.a. End of the Road)
- Mufattesh al-Mabaheth (a.k.a. The Police Inspector)
- Leqaa Fil-Ghoroob (a.k.a. Meeting at Sunset)
- Kholkhal Habeebi (a.k.a. My Love's Bugle)
- Al-Raggol al-Thani (a.k.a. The Second Man)

1961

- Wa Islamah - Prince Baybars
- Qalb Fi Zalam (a.k.a. Heart in the Shadows)
- Hob wa Herman (a.k.a. Love and Deprivation)
- He Talata - Kamal
- Fi baitina rajul - Abd El-Hamid
- Bela Awdah (a.k.a. No Return)

1962

- Al zouga talattashar
- Helwa wa kaddaba
- Sett el-Banat (a.k.a. The Lady of All Women)
- Ah Menn Hawwa (a.k.a. Beware of Eve)
- Shahidat al-Hob al-Elahi (a.k.a. Martyr of Divine Love)

1963

- La Waqt lel-Hob (a.k.a. No Time for Love)
- Aroos al-Nil - Sami Fouad (Engineer)
- Tareeq al-Shaytan (a.k.a. The Way of the Devil)
- Al-Saherra al-Saghira (a.k.a. The Young Charming) - Essmat el daramaly
- Al-Maganin Fi Naeem (a.k.a. The Insane Are in Bliss)
- Amirat el Arab

1964

- Al-Tareeq (a.k.a. The Road) - Saber
- Fatat shaza
- Al-Shayatin al-Talata (a.k.a. The Three Devils) - Saadawy
- Al badawia fi Paris

1965

- Ganab al-Safeer (a.k.a. His Excellency the Ambassador) - Ahmed Kanaan

1966

- Addow Al-Maraa (a.k.a. Enemy of Women) - Essa
- Zawga Menn Paris
- Shaqqet Al-Talabba (a.k.a. The Students' Apartment) - Saad Selim
- Saghira Ala Al-Hob - Kamal
- Mabka el oshak
- Howa wal-Nessaa (a.k.a. He and Women)
- Guanab el safir
- Al-Moshagheboon (a.k.a. Troublemakers) - Amin
- Shaqawet Reggala (a.k.a. Naughty Men)
- Mawwal (with Sabah the Lebanese Singer (A Ballad))

1967

- Gareema fil-Hayy al-Hadi (a.k.a. Crime in the Calm District) - Ahmed Ezzat
- Endama Nohheb (a.k.a. When We Love) - Ahmed
- Al-Aib (a.k.a. Shame) - Mohamed El-Guindy
- Al-Qobla al-Akhira (a.k.a. The Last Kiss) - Samy, The Director

1968

- Raw'at el-Hob (a.k.a. The Beauty of Love) - Ahmed Ragab
- Hawwaa ala al-Tareeq (a.k.a. Eve on The Road) - Khaled
- Al-Massageen al-Thalatha (a.k.a. The Three Prisoners) - Mr. Joe
- Baba Ayez Keda (a.k.a. Dad Wants So) - Kamal

1969

- El Shoug'an el Thalatha
- Nos Sa'a Gawaz (a.k.a. half an Hour of marriage)

1970

- Ghoroob wa Shorouq (a.k.a. Sunset and Sunrise) - Essam
- Al-Hob al-Daaie (a.k.a. The Lost Love)
- Al-Sarab (a.k.a. The Mirage) - Dr.Amin
- Al-Ashrar (a.k.a. Evil Men)
- Nar al-Shouq (a.k.a. Flame of Crave)
- Zawga le-Khamsat Regal (a.k.a. Wife of Five Men)

1971

- Shay' fi Sadri (a.k.a. Something in My Heart)
- Ebnati al-Aziza (a.k.a. My Dear Daughter) - Sherif
- Emraa wa Raggol (a.k.a. A Woman and A Man)

1972

- Emraa le-Koll al-Regal (a.k.a. A Woman for All Men) - Zaki
- Saaett al-Sefr (a.k.a. Zero Hour) - Hussein

1973

- Hekayti Maa Al-Zaman (a.k.a. My Story with Life)

1974

- Ayna Aqli (a.k.a. Where is My Mind) - Zohdi

1975

- Youm al-Ahad al-Damy (a.k.a. Bloody Sunday)
- Oreedo Hallan (a.k.a. Seeking A Solution)
- Hobi al awal wa al akhir
- Abadan Lann Aaoud (a.k.a. I Shall Never Come Back)

1976

- Tawheeda
- A world of children - Helmi Abdulqader

1977

- Al Domo Fe Ouyon Dhahekah
- Ah Ya Leil Ya Zamman (a.k.a. Oh Night, Oh Life)

1978

- Wa Daa al-Omr Ya Waladi (a.k.a. Life Has Gone, My Son)
- Al-Qadi wal-Gallaad (a.k.a. The Judge)

1979

- Le-Mann Toshreq al-Shams (a.k.a. For Whom the Sun Rises?)

1980

- Daerrat al-Shakk (a.k.a. Circle of Suspicion)
- Azkeyaa Lakken Aghbeyaa (a.k.a. Intelligent But Stupid) - Hamdi (final film role)

== See also ==
- List of Egyptian films of the 1960s
- The Abaza Family
