= Ezz El-Dine Zulficar =

Egyptian film director and producer (1919–1963)

Ezz El-Dine Zulficar ORE
- عز الدين ذو الفقار
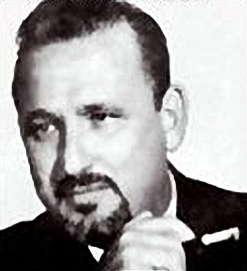
- Zulficar in 1960
- Born: Ezz El-Dine Ahmed Mourad Zulficar; 28 October 1919; Cairo, Sultanate of Egypt
- Died: 1 July 1963 (aged 43); Zamalek, Cairo, Egypt
- Other names: "The Knight of Romance" (فارس الرومانسية) "The Poet of Cinema" (شاعر السينما)
- Education: Egyptian Military College
- Occupations: Military officer; film director; film producer; screenwriter; actor
- Organization: Ezz El-Dine Zulficar Films Company
- Spouses: Faten Hamama (m. 1947; div. 1954) Kawthar Shafik (m. 1954)
- Children: 2, including Dina
- Father: Ahmed Mourad Bey Zulfikar
- Family: Zulfikar family
- Honours: Order of the Republic - Grand Cordon; Order of Sciences and Arts
- Military career
- Allegiance: Egypt
- Branch: Egyptian Armed Forces
- Service years: 1939–1947
- Rank: Captain

Ezz El-Dine Ahmed Mourad Zulficar (Arabic: عز الدين ذو الفقار, romanized: ʿIzz ad-Dīn Dhū l-Fiqār; 28 October 1919 – 1 July 1963) was an Egyptian film director, screenwriter, actor and producer known for his distinctive style, which blends romance and action. He is widely regarded one of the most influential filmmakers in the golden age of Egyptian Cinema. In a career spanning sixteen years, he directed over 30 feature films, many of which are still widely watched and studied today.

Born to the noble Zulfikar family, he initially graduated from the Egyptian Military College. He worked as a military officer in the Egyptian Armed Forces for eight years. After resigning from the military in 1947, he started his career as a filmmaker, Zulficar worked as an assistant director to director Mohamed Abdel Gawad in the films The World is Fine (1946), It Returned to its Rules (1946), Flowers and Thorns (1947). His directorial debut was Prisoner of the Shadows (1947). Zulficar's first successful film, Abu Zayd al-Hilali (1947), helped to shape the epic genre, and Khulood (1948) was a romantic hit. His crime film I'm The Past (1951) was a critical and financial success. By the early 1950s, Zulficar had local and regional recognition. A string of successful films followed, including Appointment with Life (1953), Date With Happiness (1955), I'm Going (1955), Dearer Than My Eyes (1955) shaped his own character and style as a filmmaker.

In 1957, Zulficar made three films with political backgrounds, the first was Port-Said (1957) on the 1956 War, Return My Heart (1957) and The Road of Hope (1958) both were inspired by the 1952 Revolution. All of which are classics in the memory of the audience. Zulficar's other notable films include A Woman on the Road (1958), The Street of Love (1958), Among the Ruins (1959), The Second Man (1959), The River of Love (1960), The Black Candles (1962) and A Date at the Tower (1962), all of which were also financially successful and are highly regarded by film historians. He is a recipient of multiple film awards as a director and producer. Most notably the Order of the Republic in 1963 and the Order of Sciences and Arts, which was received posthumously in 2014.

== Early life ==
He was born in Cairo on 28 October 1919, to a wealthy aristocratic family. His father Ahmed Mourad Bey Zulfikar, was a senior director of police. He was the fifth among eight siblings. His brother Mohamed who would grow up to be a businessman, Soad, Fekreya, Mahmoud, who would grow up to be a director and actor. They were followed by brothers Kamal, Salah, the famous actor and producer and finally Mamdouh who would grow up to be a businessman.

Zulficar's childhood shaped his personality, for he was attracted to sports in general, especially wrestling, swimming, and gymnastics in which he won some school championships. He was an avid reader and loved to listen to classical music. He was into buying every new record released in Egypt; a hobby he cherished until his death.

He was introduced to the cinematic world at the age of nine when his elder brother Mahmoud took him to the cinema theatre to watch Egyptian and foreign films. His passion for cinema was evident when he would watch three films in a row. If he particularly liked one movie he would watch it several times.

== Career ==
Zulficar was a prodigy. He received a scholarship and studied astronomy. After high school, he joined the Egyptian Military College to please his father, although Zulficar did not object to the idea itself, for he saw that learning military studies would widen his perceptions. During that period, he was acquainted with a number of prominent figures that shaped Egyptian politics later on, such as presidents Gamal Abdel Nasser and Anwar El Sadat, Yusuf Sibai and Tharwat Okasha and other members of the Free Officers Movement, who mounted the July 1952 Revolution. And later he was nominated twice for Minister of Culture position, but he turned down the state position. He graduated from the Egyptian Military College and later became a Captain in the Egyptian Armed Forces. Despite being a distinguished officer, a tragic event shook Zulficar to the core. His father, to whom he was very close, died. He suffered a depression and his brothers advised him to change his lifestyle and career. And indeed, he resigned with the rank of captain in the Artillery Corps to start a career in the movie business.

At that point, he remembered his strong friendship with director Kamal Selim and their cinematic discussions. Through Selim he got to know a number of coevals who became directors: Mohamed Abdel-Gawad, Salah Abu Seif, Kamel El-Telmissany and Fatin Abdel Wahab, who had just resigned from the Armed Forces and began working in cinema. He was influenced by his brother, Mahmoud Zulfikar, who was an actor, director, actor and screenwriter. He started as assistant director to Mohamed Abdel Gawad. He worked as assistant director in three films, The World Was Fine (1946), Then It Returned to Its Rules (1946), followed by Flowers and Thorns (1947). His first film as a director was Prisoner of the Shadows (1947). In 1947, he directed his first film, Prisoner of Darkness (أسير الظلام, “Aseer al-Zalam"). However, his first popular success was Abu Zayd al-Hilali (أبو زيد الهلالي, "Abu Zaid El-Helali") (1947), followed by the romantic film Khulood (خلود, "Kholoud") (1948).

By the early 1950s, Zulficar had already been a prominent figure in the Egyptian film industry. His 1951 crime film I'm the Past (أنا الماضي, "Ana El-Maady") (1951) was both a huge critical and commercial success. One of his most successful movies as a director was Return My Heart (رُدّ قلبي, "Rod Qalby") (1957) which was featured for several weeks in Cairo's cinemas. Not to mention his masterpieces; The Second Man (الرجل الثاني, “Al Rajul Al Thani") (1959), and The River of Love (نهر الحب, “Nahr Al Hub" (1960) starring Omar Sharif. In the late 1950s, he founded Ezz El-Dine Zulficar Films Company, a production company with this younger brother Salah Zulfikar, together they produced major films including The Second Man (الرجل الثاني, “Al Rajul Al Thani”) (1959), Among the Ruins (بين الأطلال, “Bain Al Atlal”) (1959) and Struggle of the Heroes (صراع الأبطال, “Sira’ Al Abtal”) (1962).

Zulficar also acted in Khulud (خُلود, "Immortality") (1948) along with Hamama. As a writer he was quite successful, he wrote scripts and stories for almost 30 films. His last two ventures were the direction and scriptwriting for the films; A Date at the Tower (موعد في البُرج, "Maw'ed Fi al-Borg") (1962) with Salah Zulfikar and Soad Hosny in the leads, and Black Candles (الشموع السوداء, "Al-Shomou' Al-Sawdaa") (1962) with Saleh Selim and Nagat in the leads. Zulficar directed three films which were listed in Top 100 Egyptian films of the 20th century.

== Personal life and death ==
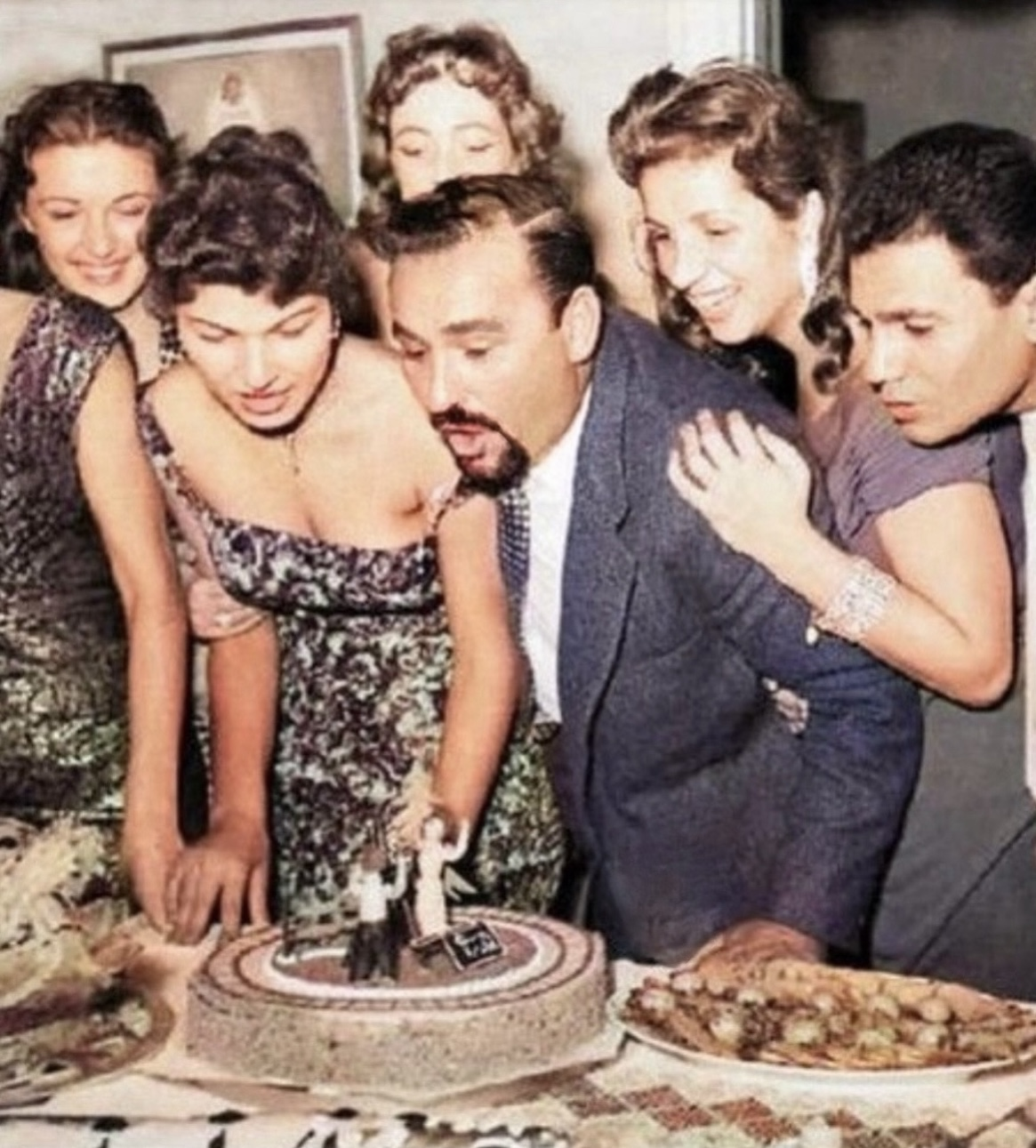
Egyptian film stars (from right to left); Abdel Halim Hafez, Sabah, Zulficar, Huda Sultan, Kawthar Shafik (Zulficar's wife), and Mariam Fakhr Eddine attending Zulficar's birthday, 1959

Zulficar met Faten Hamama while filming the Abu Zayd al-Hilali (أبو زيد الهلالي, “Abuzeid al-Hilali”) (1947), which he directed. The two fell in love and married each other. The couple had a daughter, Nadia Zulficar. Their marriage would only last for seven years, as the couple divorced in 1954. The two remained friends, and Hamama even acted in his movies after the divorce.

Afterwards, he fell in love with the actress Kawthar Shafik. This love story resulted with marriage in 1954. The couple had one daughter, Dina Zulficar. They remained married until his death in 1963.

Zulficar died following an illness at the age of 43 on 1 July 1963 in Cairo, Egypt. Despite his young age, he left a great legacy in the history of Egyptian Cinema.

== Honours ==
- Egypt: Order of the Republic (Grand Cordon)
- Egypt: Order of Sciences and Arts (1st class).

== Selected awards ==
Ezz El-Dine Zulficar has received several awards throughout his career, including:

- The second state prize in directing for the film I'm the Past, 1951.
- Prize of the Egyptian Catholic Center for Cinema Festival for the film Wafaa, 1953
- Prize of the Egyptian Catholic Center for Cinema Festival for the film Appointment with Life in 1953.
- The Lebanese Press Award for the film Appointment with Life in 1953.
- State Prize for the best story for film, Portsaid, 1957.
- State Prize in Production for Struggle of the Heroes in 1963.
- State Prize for Screenplay for Struggle of the Heroes in 1963.

== Filmography ==
=== Director ===
Year	Title	Arabic Title
1947	Prisoner of the Shadows	Aseer el Zalam, أسير الظلام
1947	Abu Zayd al-Hilali	Abu Zayd al-Hilali, أبو زيد الهلال
1948	Everybody is Singing	Al Kol Yughanni, الكل يغني
1948	Immortality	Khulood, خلود
1949	She Has Only a Few Piastres	Sahibat Al Malaleem, صاحبة الملاليم
1949	Holiday in Hell	Ajaza Fi Jahanam, اجازة في جهنم
1951	I am the Past	Ana Al Madi, أنا الماضي
1952	Ask My Heart	Isalou Qalbi, اسألوا قلبي
1953	The Murderer's Suspicion	Shak Al Qatel, شك القاتل
1953	Appointment with Life	Maw'ed Ma' al-Hayat, موعد مع الحياة
1953	The Night Train	Qitar al-Layl, قطار الليل
1954	Wafa'	Wafa', وفاء
1954	The Farewell Dance	Raqsat Al Wada', رقصة الوداع
1954	The Local Boy	Ibn Al Hara, ابن الحارة
1954	Stronger Than Love	Aqwa Min Al Hob, أقوى من الحب
1955	Date With Happiness	Maw'ed Ma' Al-Hayat, موعد مع الحياة
1955	I'm Going	Inni Rahila, اني راحلة
1955	Dearer Than My Eyes	Aghla Min Aynaya, أغلى من عينايا
1956	The Shore of Memories	Shate' Al Zikrayat, شاطئ الذكريات
1956	Wakeful Eyes	Uyoon Sahira, عيون سهرانة
1956	The Absent Lady	Al Gha'iba, الغائبة
1957	Port-Said	Bor-Said, بورسعيد
1957	A Fugitive from Love	Hareb Min Al Hub, هارب من الحب
1957	Return My Heart	Rodda Qalbi, رُد قلبي
1958	The Road of Hope	Tareeq Al Amal, طريق الأمل
1958	A Woman on the Road	Imra'a Fi Al Tareeq, امرأة في الطريق
1958	My Heart and I	Qalbi wa Ana, قلبي و أنا
1959	The Street of Love	Shara'e al Hob, شارع الحب
1959	Among the Ruins	Bain el Atlal, بين الأطلال
1960	The Second Man	Al Rajul al Thani, الرجل الثاني
1960	The Girls and Summer	Al Banat wa Al Sayf, البنات و الصيف
1961	The River of Love	Nahr Al Hub, نهر الحب
1962	The Black Candles	Al Shumou Al Sawda', الشموع السوداء
1962	A Date at the Tower	Maw'ed Fi al Burj, موعد في البرج

=== Screenwriter ===
Year	Title	Arabic Title
1947	Prisoner of the Shadows	Aseer el Zalam, أسير الظلام
1947	Abuzeid al-Hilali	Abuzeid al-Hilali, أبو زيد الهلال
1948	Everybody is Singing	Al Kol Yughanni, الكل يغني
1948	Immortality	Khulood, خلود
1949	She Has Only a Few Piastres	Sahibat Al Malaleem, صاحبة الملاليم
1951	I’m the Past	Ana Al Madi, أنا الماضي
1952	Ask My Heart	Isalou Qalbi, اسألوا قلبي
1953	The Night Train	Qitar al-Layl, قطار الليل
1954	The Farewell Dance	Raqsat Al Wada', رقصة الوداع
1954	Appointment with Life	Maw'ed Ma' al-Hayat, موعد مع الحياة
1954	The Local Boy	Ibn Al Hara, ابن الحارة
1954	Stronger Than Love	Aqwa Min Al Hob, أقوى من الحب
1955	Appointment With Happiness	Maw'ed Ma' Al-Sa`dah, موعد مع الحياة
1955	I'm Going	Inni Rahila, اني راحلة
1955	Dearer Than My Eyes	Aghla Min Aynaya, أغلى من عينايا
1956	The Shore of Memories	Shate' Al Zikrayat, شاطئ الذكريات
1956	The Absent Lady	Al Gha'iba, الغائبة
1956	Wakeful Eyes	Oyoon Sahira, عيون ساهرة
1957	Port Said	Bor-Said, بورسعيد
1957	A Fugitive from Love	Hareb Min Al Hub, هارب من الحب
1957	Return My Heart	Rudda Qalbi, رُد قلبي
1958	The Road of Hope	Tareeq Al Amal, طريق الأمل
1958	A Woman on the Road	Imra'a Fi Al Tareeq, امرأة في الطريق
1959	Among the Ruins	Bayn al Atlal, بين الأطلال
1960	The Second Man	Al Rajul al Thani, الرجل الثاني
1961	The River of Love	Nahr Al Hub, نهر الحب
1962	Struggle of the Heroes	Sira’ Al-Abtal', صراع الأبطال
1962	A Date at the Tower	Maw'ed Fi al Burj, موعد في البرج
1963	Saladin the Victorious	Naser Salah al-Dine, ناصر صلاح الدين

=== Producer ===
Year	Title	Arabic Title
1947	Prisoner of the Shadows	Aseer el Zalam, أسير الظلام
1954	Appointment with Life	Maw'ed Ma' al-Hayat, موعد مع الحياة
1955	Appointment with Happiness	Maw'ed Maa al-Sa'ada, موعد مع السعادة
1959	Among the Ruins	Bayn al Atlal, بين الأطلال
1959	The Second Man	Al Rajul al Thani, الرجل الثاني
1960	Angel and Devil	Malaak wa Sheitan, ملاك وشيطان
1960	The Holy Bond	Al Rebat Al Moqaddas, الرباط المقدس
1961	Without Tears	Bela Domoo', بلا دموع
1962	Struggle of the Heroes	Sira’ Al-Abtal', صراع الأبطال
1962	The Black Candles	Al Shumou Al Sawda', الشموع السوداء

=== Actor ===
Year	Title	Arabic Title	Role
1948	Immortality	Kholood, خلود	Mahmoud

== See also ==
- Egyptian cinema
- Lists of Egyptian films
