= List of Egyptian films of the 1940s =

Below are lists of films produced in Egypt in the 1940s.

- List of Egyptian films of 1940
- List of Egyptian films of 1941
- List of Egyptian films of 1942
- List of Egyptian films of 1943
- List of Egyptian films of 1944
- List of Egyptian films of 1945
- List of Egyptian films of 1946
- List of Egyptian films of 1947
- List of Egyptian films of 1948
- List of Egyptian films of 1949
