= List of Egyptian films of the 1930s =

Below are lists of films produced in Egypt in the 1930s.

- List of Egyptian films of 1930
- List of Egyptian films of 1931
- List of Egyptian films of 1932
- List of Egyptian films of 1933
- List of Egyptian films of 1934
- List of Egyptian films of 1935
- List of Egyptian films of 1936
- List of Egyptian films of 1937
- List of Egyptian films of 1938
- List of Egyptian films of 1939
