= List of Egyptian films of the 1980s =

Below are lists of films produced in Egypt in the 1980s.

- List of Egyptian films of 1980
- List of Egyptian films of 1981
- List of Egyptian films of 1982
- List of Egyptian films of 1983
- List of Egyptian films of 1984
- List of Egyptian films of 1985
- List of Egyptian films of 1986
- List of Egyptian films of 1987
- List of Egyptian films of 1988
- List of Egyptian films of 1989
