= And the Devil is Their Third Accomplice =

1978 film

And the devil is their third accomplice
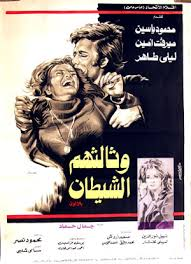
- Official movie poster
- Written by: Gamal Hamad
- Produced by: Abdel Aziz Ali
- Starring: Mervat Amin; Mahmoud Yassin
- Cinematography: Mohamed Shaker
- Edited by: Enayat El Sayes
- Music by: El Sayed Bedir
- Production companies: Union films and Dollar films
- Distributed by: Union films and Dollar films
- Release date: March 1978
- Running time: 115 minutes
- Country: Egypt
- Language: Arabic

And the Devil is their third accomplice (Arabic: وثالثهم الشيطان, Transliterated W'al Shaytan Thalethahoma) is a 1978 psychological drama romance film directed by Sami Shalaby and based on a scenario of the same name written by Youssef Francis. The film stars Mervat Amin and Mahmoud Yassin as a young couple who fall in love. The story is narrated from the present day by Hesham (Mahmoud Amin), telling the tale of how he ended up in prison after being accused of the kidnapping of Afaf (Mervat Amin), to the audience.

The movie is R-rated according to Dollar films as well as being nominated for best screenplay award in the 1978 Cairo International film festival.

== Plot ==
Hesham (Mahmoud Yassin) is a professional theatrical actor living in Cairo. The theater he works in was preparing to open the season with an Arabic version of the play written by Shakespeare, Hamlet. The movie transitions from the present day to flashback narrated by Hesham of how he arrived to his current stance. After asking for Afaf's hand in marriage, Hesham gets rejected by her father, causing the young couple to escape to the country side, where they would supposedly get married.

Meanwhile, Hesham suffers from a psychological disorder that we find out was the reason behind his attempt to suffocate his acting accomplice that was playing his mother in Hamlet. The disorder was based on Hesham's dedication in portraying and playing his character as he occasionally cannot snap out of his role. Afaf's father's reason for rejecting Hesham was based upon the fact that he had another groom in mind for his daughter which initiated the idea of escaping and caused Hesham to travel to Alexandria for a few days.

In Alexandria, Hesham was being offered a role in the movie Nawal, his acting accomplice, was in. He gets called upon Nawal to join her in her apartment where he continues to cheat on Afaf. He then goes to the country side where he would meet Afaf. Afaf continues to run away to the country side to be with him, accompanied by Yasser (the doctor). Upon her arrival, she finds out about Hesham's disorder. As Yasser leaves them alone, Hesham automatically snaps into a character, and sexually harassed Afaf but she escaped from his violent embrace.

As she is running away, she falls, hitting her head which causes a concussion. Whilst being found and taken to the hospital by a stranger, her dad calls the police and makes a claim that Hesham had kidnapped his daughter. Hesham precedes into seeing a psychiatrist to find out how to cure his condition. We find out from his confessions to the doctor that he had, at a young age, witnessed the rape of his mother by his uncle and could neither do something about it nor tell anyone as it would tarnish his mother's honor. The doctor then pays a visit to the theatre Hesham works in and continues to explain to the director that Hesham is slowly being cured and is no longer incapable of controlling his character, he is of no danger to anyone. Hesham them gets his job back and asks for Afaf's hand in marriage a second time in which her father accepts to prevent his daughter from running away again and to ensure her happiness.

== Cast ==
=== Main cast ===
- Mervat Amin as Afaf
- Mahmoud Yassin as Hesham
- Laila Taher as Nawal / Hashem's acting accomplice
- Hanem Mohamed as Hesham's Aunt
- Layla Mokhtar as Nahed / Hesham's sister
- Saad Ardash as Afaf's father
- Ahmad Khamis as Nageeb Hamdi
- Mohamed Wafik as detective
- Nabil Al Desouki as Psychiatrist
- Salah El Eskandarani as Ma'thoun
- Badria Abd El Gawad as Badria Al Sayed

=== Supporting cast ===
- Sulah Rashwan
- Farouk al-Fishawy
- Fifi Youssef
- Moustafa Al Shami
- Mourad Sleiman
- Mahmoud Zohari
- Ali Azb
- Mohamed abu Hashish
- Mona Abdullah

== Casting ==
Casting was administered by Galal Zahra. It is not unusual for Mahmoud Yassin and Mervat Amin to be together in a movie as they were portrayed as lovers in many other movies like Ayam Al Rub (Days of Terror), Daqqit Qal (A heart's beat), and La Tatrokoni Wahdi ( Do not Leave me alone).

== Production ==
The film was a Union films and Dollar films production which was distributed worldwide. The film was shot on 20 March and is 115 minutes long. The story was written by Gamal Hamad as well as the scenario by Yousef Francis and Ahmad Abd El Wahab. The crew included:

- Assistant producer: Abd el Lateef Zaki and Mahmoud Hussen
- Camera man: Mohamed Shaker
- Assistant Camera man: Makram Salem
- Photography: Hussein Bakr
- Editor: Enayat El Sayes
- Negative Photography: Adek Shokry
- Sound Recordring: Arnset Sabbagh
- Sound Effects: Al Shohary
- Production Manager: Abdel Aziz Ali
- Musical Composition: El Sayed Bder
- Montage: Abdel Aziz Fokhary
- Tunes and Instrumental: Gamal Salama
- Interior photography: Cinema City Labs and Al Ahram studios

== Commercial and Critical reception ==
Having received the Adults only seal from the board of censors in Egypt, the film debuted on 20 March 1978 to returns over 500,000 LE in its first week. It was also nominated for best screenplay award in the 1978 Cairo International film festival, but failed to win. It was also rated at 5.7/10 by cinema.com

Some of Egypt's lawmakers took to the floor of the people's assembly and responded to protests against the film for its sexually explicit content.
