= Guilty Conscience =

Guilty Conscience may refer to:

== Film ==
- A Guilty Conscience (1921 film), an American silent film
- A Guilty Conscience, a 1931 Egyptian film
- Guilty Conscience (film), a 1985 American TV movie
- A Guilty Conscience (2023 film), a Hong Kong film

== Music ==
- Guilty Conscience (album) or the title song, by J. Holiday, 2014
- "Guilty Conscience" (song), by Eminem, 1999
- "Guilty Conscience 2", by Eminem, 2024
- "Guilty Conscience", a song by 070 Shake from Modus Vivendi, 2020
- "Guilty Conscience", a song by Kneecap, 2021
- "Guilty Conscience", a song by Tate McRae from Think Later, 2023

== See also ==
- Conscience, for the psychological phenomenon
- Consciousness of guilt, the legal evidence of a guilty conscience
