= List of Egyptian films of 1930 =

A list of films produced in Egypt in 1930. For an A-Z list of films currently on Wikipedia, see Category:Egyptian films.

Title	Director	Cast	Genre	Notes
Zaynab	Mohammed Karim	Bahiga Hafez, Zaki Rostom		First Egyptian film to feature the Egyptian countryside and peasants in the role of peasants. (Based on Muhammad Husayn Haykal's Zaynab, the first modern Egyptian novel.)
Taht Daw' Al-Qamar (In the Moonlight)	Choukri Madi	Ensaf Rouchdi, Abdel Mooti Higazi		First Egyptian "talking picture". (The sound was on records synchronized with the film, and included both voice and music.)
Guinayat Mountasaf Al-Layl (The Midnight Crime)	Mohamed Sabri	Anwar Wagdi, Olwiyya Gamil, Abdel Meneim Mokhtar		
Mou'guizat Al-Hobb (Miracle of Love)	Ibrahim Lama	Badr Lama, Sorayya Rifaat		
Al-Kokayeen / Al-Hawiyah (Cocaine / The Abyss)	Togo Mizrahi	Ahmed al-Machriqi, Fatma Hassan		
