= Third class =

Third class may refer to:

- Third class cabin, a class of travel accommodations

== Arts and entertainment ==
- 3rd Class, a 2020 Kannada film
- The 3rd Class, a 1988 Egyptian film
- The Third-Class Carriage (Le Wagon de troisième classe), painting by Honoré Daumier

== Education ==
- Third-class degree, a British undergraduate degree classification
- Third class (classe de troisième), a French education level; see National diploma (France)

== Other uses ==
- Class III, a level of creditor; see Preferential creditor
- Third class objects in computing; see First-class citizen
