= Goodbye My Friend =

Goodbye My Friend may refer to:

- "Goodbye My Friend", a song by Blind Guardian from Tales from the Twilight World
- "Goodbye My Friend", a song by Boney M. from Boonoonoonoos
- "Goodbye My Friend", a song by Dokken from Long Way Home
- "Goodbye My Friend", a song by Engelbert Humperdinck
- "Goodbye My Friend", a song by Karla Bonoff from New World
- "Goodbye My Friend", a song by Linda Ronstadt from Cry Like a Rainstorm, Howl Like the Wind
- "Goodbye My Friend", a song by Pop Evil from Onyx
- "Goodbye my friend, goodbye", a poem by Sergei Yesenin
- Goodbye, My Friend, an episode of 30 Rock
- Goodbye, My Friend, an episode of While You Were Sleeping
- Salam Ya Sahby (Goodbye My Friend), a 1986 Egyptian film

== See also ==
- Farewell My Friend, a song by Dennis Wilson
