= A Bullet in the Heart =

- Poster
- Directed by: Mohammed Karim
- Written by: Tewfik El-Hakim; Mohammed Karim
- Produced by: Mohamed Abdel Wahab
- Starring: Faten Hamama; Seraj Munir; Raqiya Ibrahim; Mohamed Abdel Wahab
- Cinematography: Mohamed Abdel Azim
- Release date: 27 March 1944
- Country: Egypt
- Language: Arabic

A Bullet in the Heart (Arabic: رصاصة في القلب, romanized: Raṣāṣa fī l-Qalb) is a 1944 Egyptian drama film directed by Mohammed Karim starring Egyptian actresses Raqiya Ibrahim, Faten Hamama, musician Mohamed Abdel Wahab and actor Seraj Munir. It is based on a novel by Tewfik El-Hakim which was depicted in the 1964 play under the same starring Salah Zulfikar.

== Plot ==
Mohsen is a ladies' man. He has a close friend who is a polite doctor. Mohsen meets a lady, Fifi, and falls in love with her. He later discovers that she is engaged to his friend, the doctor. Although she wants to be Mohsen's lady, not the doctor's, Mohsen abandons her—he refuses her love and remains loyal to his friend.

== Cast ==
- Faten Hamama as Najwah
- Mohamed Abdel Wahab as Mohsen
- Raqiya Ibrahim as Fifi
- Seraj Munir as the doctor
- Zeinat Sedki
- Samia Gamal
- Bechara Wakim
- Hassan Kamel
- Ali Al-Kassar

== See also ==
- Egyptian cinema
- A Bullet in the Heart (play)
- Salah Zulfikar filmography
- List of Egyptian films of 1944
- List of Egyptian films of the 1940s
