= The Hunger (1986 film) =

The Hunger (Al-Go'a) (الجوع)
- Directed by: Ali Badrakhan
- Written by: Esam Ali; Aly Badrakhan
- Based on: The Hunger; 1986 novel by Naguib Mahfouz
- Produced by: Ali Badr Khan
- Starring: Soad Hosny; Mahmoud Abdel Aziz; Yousra
- Cinematography: Mahmoud Abdelsamie
- Release date: 1986
- Running time: 151 minutes
- Country: Egypt
- Language: Arabic

The Hunger (Al-Go'a, الجوع) is a 1986 Egyptian drama/romance movie, starring Souad Hosni, Yousra and Mahmoud Abdel Aziz.

== Plot ==
The movie, based upon the novel of the same name by Naguib Mahfouz, examines the social conditions of Cairenes during the first decade of the twentieth century. In doing so, both the movie and novel deal extensively with the themes of poverty and death.

== Cast ==
- Soad Hosni as Zubeida
- Yousra
- Mahmoud Abdel Aziz
- Abdel Aziz Makhyoun
- Hanan Soliman
- Sana’a Younis
- Adel Awad

== See also ==
- Egyptian films of the 1980s
- List of Egyptian films of 1986
