= List of Egyptian films of 1987 =

A list of films produced in Egypt in 1987. For an A-Z list of films currently on Wikipedia, see Category:Egyptian films.

Title	Director	Cast	Genre	Notes
Al-Nemr Wa Al-Ontha (The Tiger and the Woman)	Samir Seif	Adel Emam, Athar El Hakim, Anwar Ismail	Action / crime	
El Beih El Bawab (His Excellency the Porter)		Ahmad Zaki, Safeya El Emary	Drama	
El-Millionaira El-Hafya (The Barefoot Millionaire)	Nagy Anglo	Salah Zulfikar, Hala Fouad	Action / Comedy	
El Yom El Sadis (The Sixth Day)	Youssef Chahine			
Zawgat Ragol Mohim (The Wife of an Important Man)	Mohamed Khan	Ahmad Zaki, Mervat Amin	Drama / thriller	Entered into the 15th Moscow International Film Festival
