= List of Egyptian films of 1985 =

A list of films produced in Egypt in 1985. For an A-Z list of films currently on Wikipedia, see Category:Egyptian films.

Title	Director	Cast	Genre	Notes
Al-halfout (The Vile)	Samir Seif	Adel Emam, Ilham Chahine, Saeed Saleh, Salah Kabil	Comedy / drama	
Al-ins wal jinn (Humans and Jinns)	Mouhamed Rady	Adel Emam, Yousra, Ezzat El Alaili, Amina Rizk	Horror	
El Zamar (The Piper)	Atef El-Tayeb	Nour El-Sherif, Poussi, Salah El-Saadany	Drama	Entered into the 14th Moscow International Film Festival
Khally Balak Men Aqlak (Take Care of Your Mind)	Mohamed Abdel Aziz	Adel Emam, Sherihan	Comedy	
Ramadan Fawq Al-Borkan (Ramadan Above the Volcano)	Ahmed El-Sabawy	Adel Emam, Ilham Chahine, Samir Ghanem	Comedy / crime	
Weda'an Bonapart (Adieu Bonaparte)	Youssef Chahine	Michel Piccoli, Salah Zulfikar, Patrice Chéreau, Taheyya Kariokka	Historical drama / war	Entered into the 1985 Cannes Film Festival
Zoj Taht Al-Talab (Husband Upon Request)	Adel Sadiq	Adel Emam, Laila Elwi, Fouad el-Mohandes	Comedy	
