= List of Egyptian films of 1939 =

A list of films produced in Egypt in 1939. For an A-Z list of films currently on Wikipedia, see Category:Egyptian films.

Title	Director	Cast	Genre	Notes
The Will (1939 film) (Al Azeema)	Kamal Selim	Anwar Wagdy, Fatma Rushdy, Hussein Sedky	Drama, Romance	
