= Youssef Francis =

Egyptian film director

Yousef Francis
- Born: June 6, 1934
- Died: April 2001 (aged 66)
- Citizenship: Egypt
- Education: Film director
- Awards: The first oil painting prize from the Cairo Salon in 1960 Science Film Award Alexandria Festival Prize

Youssef Francis (Arabic:يوسف فرنسيس) (June 6, 1934 – April 14, 2001) is a director, author, and plastic artist, born in Cairo.

== His life ==
He obtained a Bachelor of Fine Arts in the Department of Photography in 1957, then postgraduate studies for two years in the ceremony of Luxor, a diploma of the Higher Institute of Cinema, then postgraduate studies in the Department of Directing in 1970, and he has many books in various fields.

At the beginning of his career, he worked as an illustrator for "Rose Al-Youssef" magazine in 1958 for a year, then he went to writing the script in 1965 and joined Al-Ahram newspaper in 1964, and he worked there until he reached the position of advisor to the editor-in-chief. He illustrated the serialized publication of Naguib Mahfuz's novel Miramar in 1966. Also he was appointed director of the Egyptian Cultural Center in 1987 in Paris.

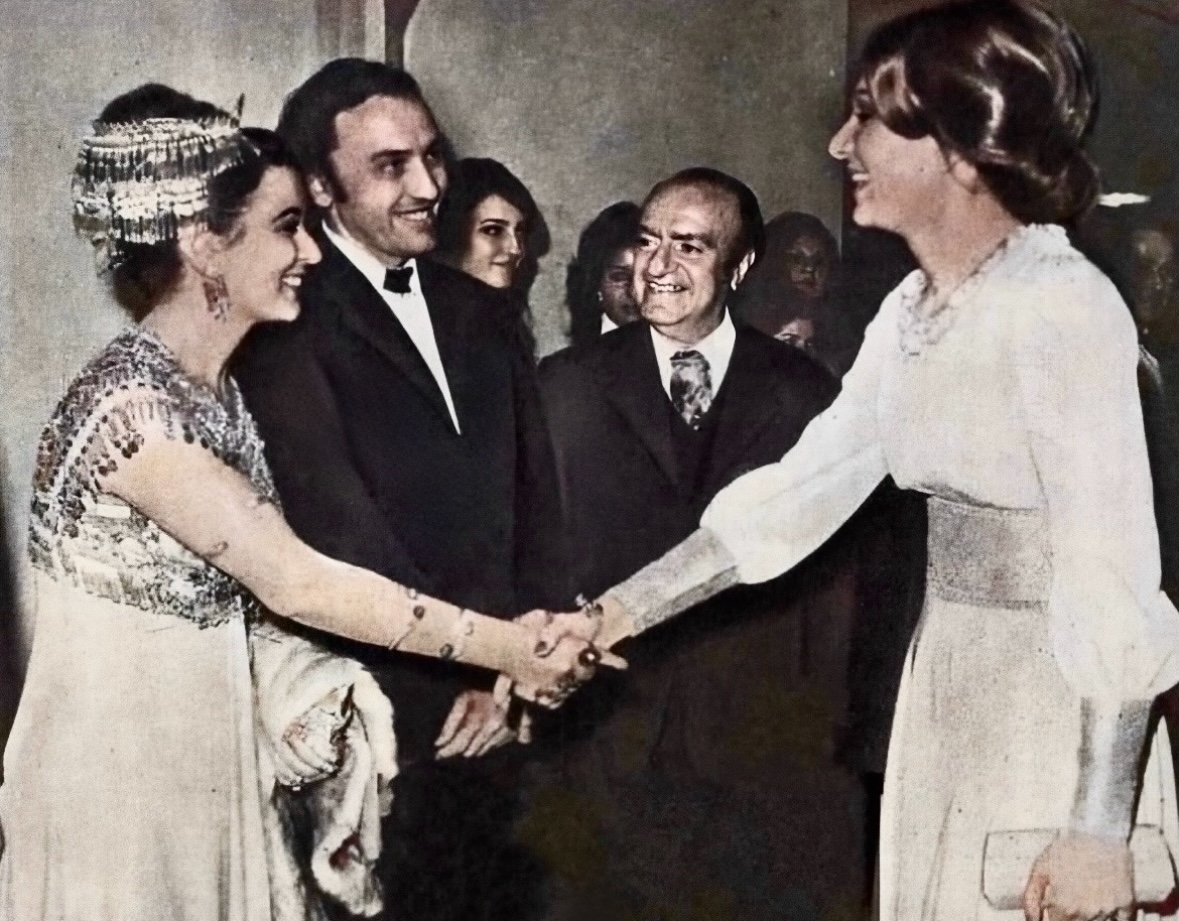
Francis shaking hands with Iranian Queen Farah Pahlavi with actress Soad Hosny on his right in the Tehran International Film Festival, 1973

His first films, The Impossible in 1965 with the participation of Mustafa Mahmoud, and among his films, My Father on the Tree in 1969, with the participation of Ihssan Abdel Quddous and Saad Eddin Wahba, and the film The Thin Thread in 1971. Among his most important television works is the 1980 miniseries "Illusion and Truth" starred by film star Salah Zulfikar as well as the films "Tutankhamun" and "My Love Who Are You".

He married journalist Mona Siraj, deputy editor-in-chief of Akhbar al-Nas magazine, and had two sons.

== His death ==
He died on April 14, 2001, at the age of 67, as a result of a heart attack that struck him in the coastal city of Hurghada, where he was spending time for rest and recreation.

== Awards ==
- The first oil painting prize from the Cairo Salon in 1960.
- Science Film Award.
- Alexandria Festival Prize.

== His works ==
=== Authorship ===
- Baby Who Are You (2000)
- The Women's Market (1994)
- My Friend How Much you Worth (1987)
- East Bird (1986)
- The Addict (1983)
- The Third of them the Devil (1978)
- The Thin Thread (1971)
- My Father up in the Tree (1969)
- The People inside (1969)
- Three Thieves (One story) (1966)
- The Impossible (1965)
- No, dear daughter (1979)

=== Directed ===
- Baby Who Are You (2000)
- Searching for Tutankhamun (1995)
- The Women's Market (1994)
- My Friend How Much you Worth (1987)
- East Bird (1986)
- The Addict (1983)
