= List of Egyptian films of 1936 =

A list of films produced in Egypt in 1936. For an A-Z list of films currently on Wikipedia, see Category:Egyptian films.

Title	Director	Cast	Genre	Notes
Ounchoudat Al-Radio (The Song of the Radio)	Telio Chiarini	Nadra, Bechara Wakim		
Bisalamtouh 'awiz Yitgawwiz (His Highness Wishes to Marry)	Alexandre Farkache	Naguib el-Rihani, Aziza Amir		
Weddad	Fritz Kramp	Umm Kulthum, Ahmed Allam	Drama, romance	
Mit Alf Guinih (A Hundred Thousand Pounds)	Togo Mizrahi	Ali al-Kassar, Zeinab Labib		
Malikat al-masarih (The Queen of the Stage)	Mario Volpi	Badia Massabni, Mokhtar Osman		
Al-Banknot (The Banknote)	Ahmed Galal	Ahmed Galal, Assia Dagher		
Al-Harib (The Fugitive)	Ibrahim Lama	Badr Lama, Fatma Rouchdi		
Al-Yad Al-Sawda (The Black Hand)	Maurice Aptekman	Aqila Rateb, Hamed Morsi		
Khafir Al-Darak (The Policeman)	Togo Mizrahi	Ali al-Kassar, Zouzou Labib, Amina Mohamed		
Abou Zarifa	Alvisi Orfanelli	Fawzi al-Gazaerli, Ehsane al-Gazaerli		
Zawgah Bil Niyabah (A Wife By Proxy)	Ahmed Galal	Ahmed Galal, Assia Dagher		
Al-Abyad wal aswad (Black and White)	Alvisi Orfanelli	Fawzi Mounib, Zouzou Labib		
Koullouh Illa Kidah (Anything But That)	Carlo Bobba	Beba, Mohamed Kamal al-Masri		
