= List of Egyptian films before 1920 =

List of Egyptian films from 1907 to 1919:

Title	Director	Cast	Genre	Notes
1907
The Visit of the Khedive Abbas Helmi (Zyaret Al Khidiwi 'Abbas Helmi)			Short Documentary	First Egyptian documentary.
1918
Bedouin's honor (Sharaf El Badawi)		Mohamed Karim	Short	
The Deadly Flowers (Al Azhar Al Momita)		Mohammed Karim	Short	This film was never projected and is considered the first Egyptian film to be banned from viewing for religious reasons
1919
Madame Loretta	Leonard Ricci	Fawzi El Gazayerly		Adaptation of a play; featuring the Egyptian theatre actor Fawzi El Gazayerly and his theatrical troupe.
