= Tehran International Film Festival =

Annual festival held in Iran (1972–1977)

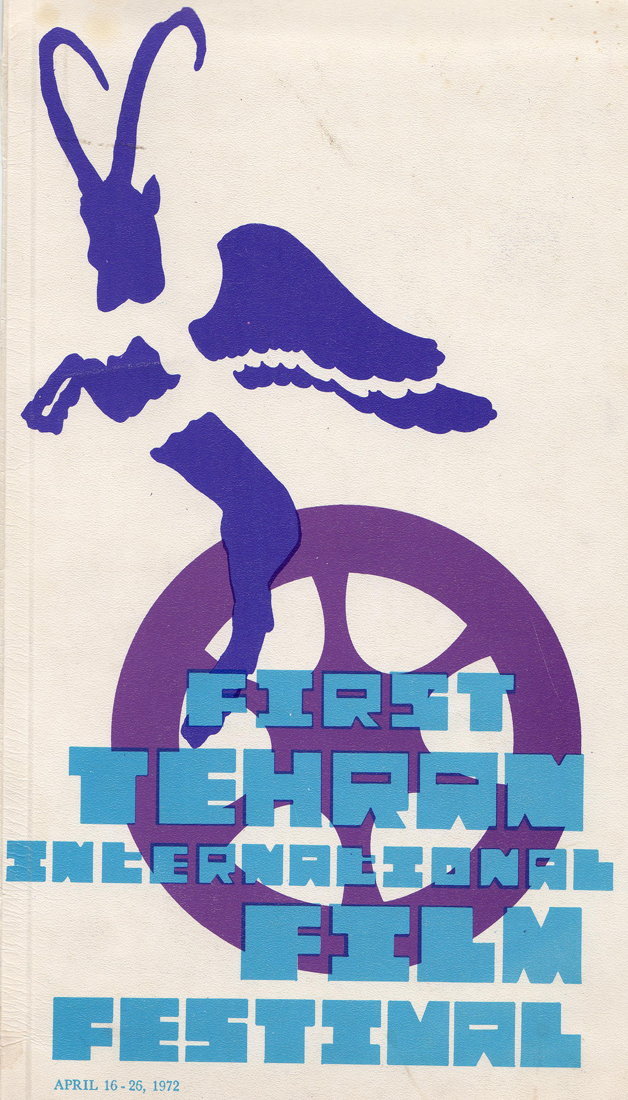
- Poster of the first edition of the festival, by Guity Novin
- Location: Tehran, Iran
- Established: 1972
- Disestablished: 1977
- Awards: winged goat (Persian: بز بالدار)

Tehran International Film Festival (Persian: جشنواره جهانی فیلم تهران) was an annual festival that was held in Iran before the 1979 Iranian Revolution.

== Details ==
In this festival, selected films of Iranian cinema competed alongside works from other countries.

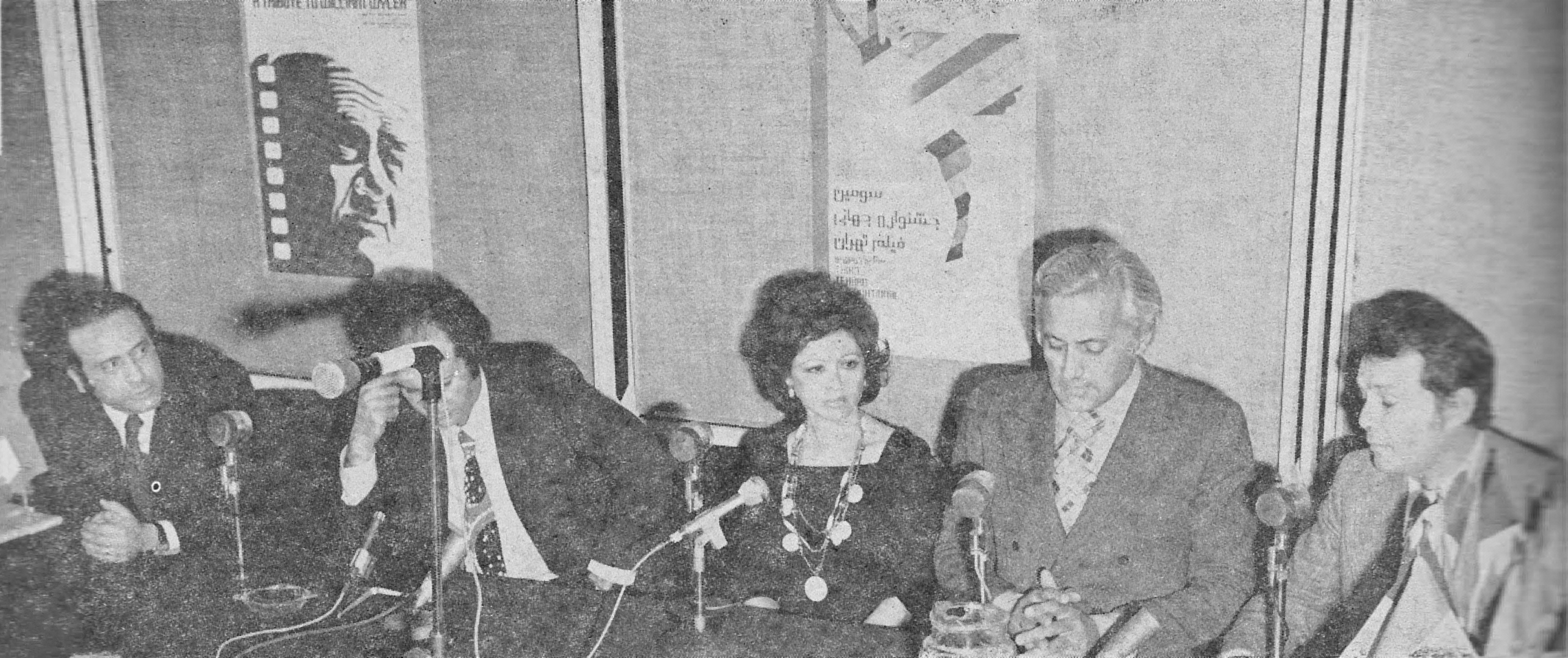
The press conference of the film want a solution in the third period of the Tehran International Film Festival.

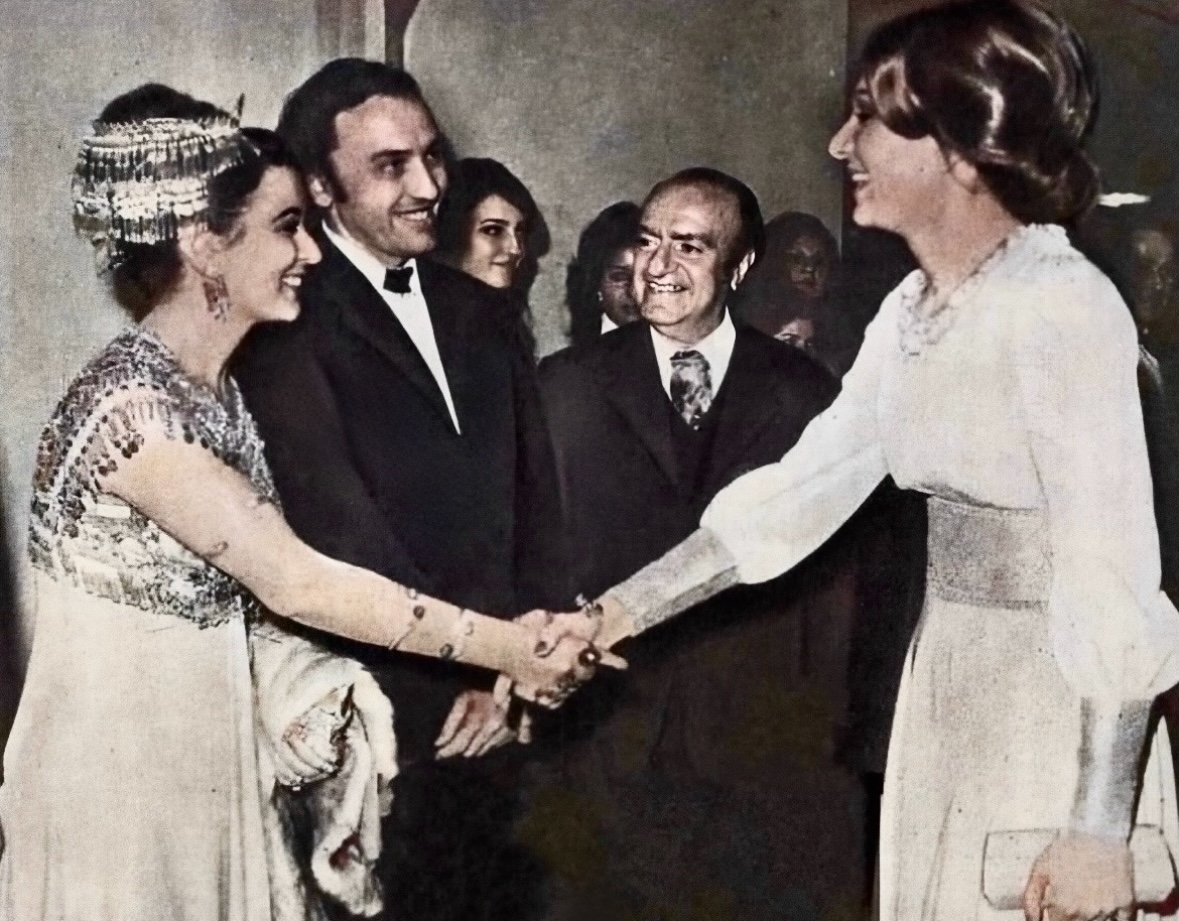
Empress Farah Pahlavi shaking hands with Egyptian actress Soad Hosny and Egyptian writer Youssef Francis in the third period of the Tehran International Film Festival.

The first period of the festival was held in 1973 and the last period (the sixth period) was held in 1977, which was closed after the revolution and after 4 years, it was held simultaneously with the Fajr International Film Festival.

Tehran International Film Festival was held with the support of Farah Pahlavi's special office.
