= Days of Terror =

- Egyptian Arabic: أيام الرعب
- Directed by: Said Marzouk
- Written by: Gamal Al-Ghitani
- Starring: Salah Zulfikar; Mahmoud Yassin; Mervat Amin
- Cinematography: Tarek El-Telmissany
- Edited by: Adel Mounir
- Production companies: Arab Corporation for Art and Media Production
- Distributed by: El Nasr Films
- Release date: October 13, 1988 (Egypt)
- Running time: 100 minutes
- Country: Egypt
- Language: ِEgyptian Arabic

Days of Terror (Egyptian Arabic: أيام الرعب, translit. Ayam Al-Ro'ab) is a 1988 Egyptian action-thriller film written by Gamal Al-Ghitani and directed by Said Marzouk. It stars Salah Zulfikar, Mahmoud Yassin and Mervat Amin. The film was released on 13 October 1988 by El Nasr Films.

== Plot ==
El Hag Abdel Rahim is a religious rich seller living in Al Hussain neighborhood who has one daughter, Salwa. She loves Mahrous, the son of migrant who escaped to Cairo 20 years ago for escaping from revenge, is working in an Egyptian Museum. When planning to get married he receives the news that Aweidah has been released from prison and is out to get revenge on him. Mahrous memories come flooding back and fear returns to his life turning him into a paranoid man. He quits his job and leaves the whole world around him to escape from his inevitable fate. Which means that Mahrous did not completely get rid of the old fear, but with this fear lurking inside all these years. In the end the solution is to confront fear and try to overcome it even if that is the end.

== Crew ==
- Story: Gamal Al-Ghitani
- Screenplay: Youssry El-Gindi
- Directed by: Said Marzouk
- Cinematography: Tarek El-Telmissany
- Production Studio: Arab International Art and Media production
- Distribution: El Nasr Films

== Primary cast ==
- Salah Zulfikar as (El-Hag Abdel Rahim)
- Mahmoud Yassin as (Mahroos)
- Mervat Amin as (Salwa)
- Ahmed Bedier as (Dardiri Al-Fran)
- Zahret El-Ola as (Salwa’s mother, Aisha)
- Hayatem as (Fayqa)
- Ghassan Matar as (Awaida)
- Naima Al Sagheer as (Hajja Zahra)
- Ahmed Nabil Badour (Saad Al-Fran)
- Hassan Hussein Badour (owner of the popular bath)
- Mahmoud Farag

== See also ==
- Salah Zulfikar filmography
- List of Egyptian films of 1988
- List of Egyptian films of the 1980s
