= Sayed Zayan =

Sayed Zayan سيد زيان
- Born: 17 August 1943 upper Egypt, Egypt
- Died: 13 April 2016 (aged 72); Cairo, Egypt
- Occupation: Actor
- Years active: 1968–2004

Sayed Zayan (Arabic: سيد زيان; 17 August 1943 – 13 April 2016) was an Egyptian actor.

== Selected filmography ==
- 1974: Dunya
- 1974: Sons of Silence
- 1974: Where Is My Mind?
- 1975: I Want a Solution
- 1983: The Beggar
- 1986: Easabat Al'nisa
- 1987: Mr. Janitor

== Plays ==
- Taxi Driver

== Death ==
Zayan died on the morning of Wednesday, 13 April 2016 in Cairo, at the age of 73, after struggling with disease.

== See also ==
- List of Egyptians
