= The Will (1939 film) =

- العزيمة
- Directed by: Kamal Selim
- Written by: Kamal Selim; Badie Khairy
- Produced by: Egypt Film Studio
- Starring: Fatima Rushdi
- Cinematography: Ferry Farkash
- Edited by: Kamal Selim
- Music by: Abdul-Hamid Abdulrahman
- Production company: Studio Misr
- Distributed by: Studio Misr
- Release date: 6 November 1939 (Egypt)
- Running time: 110 minutes
- Country: Egypt
- Language: Egyptian Arabic

The Will or Determination (Arabic: العزيمة, translit. El-Azeema) is a 1939 Egyptian film, directed by Kamal Selim. It stars Fatima Rushdi. The film is considered one of the greatest Egyptian movies of all time, and has been voted the best Egyptian film of all time in the list of Top 100 Egyptian films in 20th century, among other websites and magazines. The Will was produced by Egypt Film Studio for Studio Misr and was released on November 6, 1939 by Studio Misr.

== Plot ==
A young couple, Muhammad and Fatima, fall in love and get married. However, their bliss is cut short when Muhammad loses his job and is forced to work as fabric salesman, without telling his wife. Some of the neighbors then scheme to get Fatima to see her husband working as a fabric salesman. Things turn around when his reason for dismissal from his old job disappears and he is rehired, and all seems well for the young couple. The film paints a vivid picture of the economic crisis that ravaged Egypt in the 1930s.

== Cast ==
- Fatima Rushdi as Fatima
- Hussein Sedki as Mohamed
- Anwar Wagdy as Adly Nazih
- Zaki Rostom as Nazih Pasha
- Abbas Fares as Pasha, the manager
- Abdel Aziz Khalil as El Etre
- Mary Munib as Fatima's mother
- Hassan Kamel as Fatima's father
- Thoraya Fakhry as Mohamed's mother
- Abdel Salam Al Nabulsy as Adly's friend
- Hikmat Fahmy as Ferdoos
- Ali Tabanjat as Shabak
- Mukhtar Othman as Hag Rouhi
- Omar Wasfi as Ustaz Hanfy
- Amal Hussein
- Mukhtar Hussein
- Ahmed Shukry

== Crew ==
- Director: Kamal Selim
- Story and screenplay: Kamal Selim
- Dialogue: Badie Khairy
- Production: Studio Misr
- Distribution: Studio Misr
- Cinematography: Ferry Farkash
- Scenes: Wali El Din Sameh
- Music: Abdel Hamid Abdel Rahman
- Editing: Kamal Selim

== Production ==
Director Kamal Selim took great care on the production design aspect of filming, in order to make it seem as if he had filmed live at the slums of Egypt. As a result, it is considered the first film to accurately and realistically display the slums of Egypt. Kamal Selim was earnest to make a film depicting the real Egyptian community, but the film was initially rejected by Studio Misr's manager for discussing such a sensitive topic. The film was later accepted for production with a signed contract by Kamal Selim to change the name of the movie from "The Slum" to "The Will" and the payment of a penal damage of producing five movies for Studio Misr with unpaid wages.

Kamal Selim's choice fell on Fatma Rouchdi as the lead actress of the film, whose wages were the highest in the industry at that time. Mahmoud el-Meliguy was the planned lead actor for the film, but he declined the role for being engaged with his theatre work, and hence Anwar Wagdy was assigned the role.

== Themes ==
The Will was one of the first films to accurately portray the slums of Egypt. It has been praised for its realistic depiction of life in the slums, and the struggles men and women go through within these slums. Released in 1939, The Will has carried on an enduring legacy, due in part to its sympathetic view on the lives of the average Egyptian people, who did not enjoy much luxuries at the time, and who often faced struggles with love and employment similar to the ones faced by the protagonist in the film, making the film a social commentary on its era.

== Critical reception ==
The Will was voted the #1 Egyptian film by egypty.com, and is often cited as one of the greatest films ever made.

== Legacy ==
The Will is considered one of the first examples, or one of the precursors, of the Italian Neorealism movement in film, which would later expand to include films such as Bicycle Thieves and Pather Panchali.
