= Zaynab (film) =

1930 film

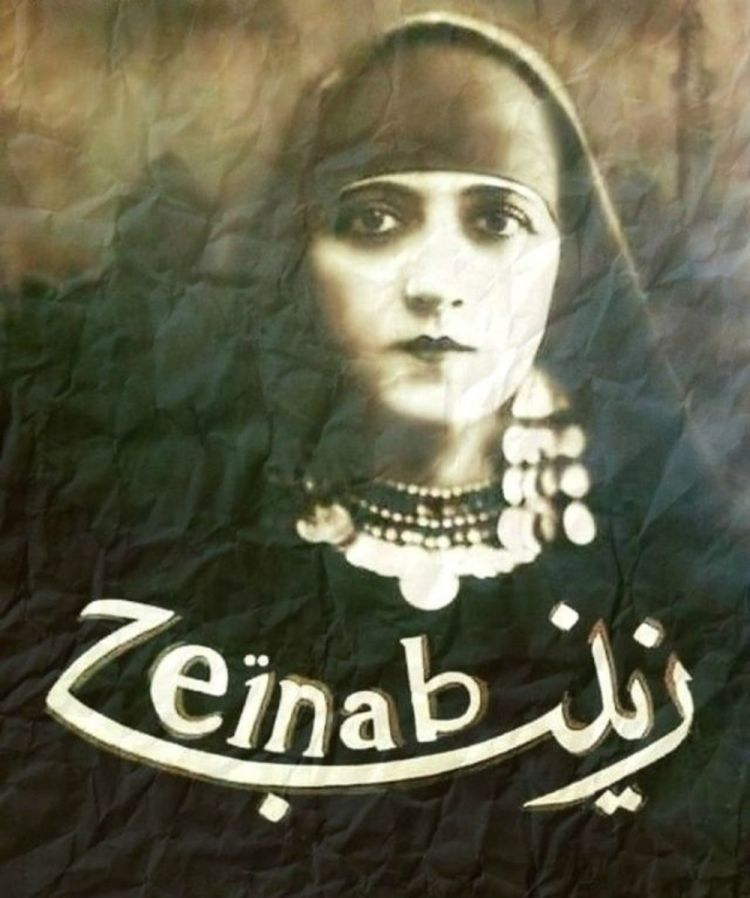
- Film poster
- Directed by: Mohammed Karim
- Written by: Mohamed Hussein Heikal
- Produced by: Youssef Wahbi
- Starring: Bahiga Hafez; Zaki Rostom
- Cinematography: Mohamed Abdelazim; Hassan Murad; Gaston Madre
- Edited by: Mohammed Karim
- Music by: Bahiga Hafez
- Production company: Ramses Film
- Release date: 9 April 1930 (Egypt)
- Running time: 110 minutes
- Country: Egypt
- Language: Egyptian Arabic

Zaynab is a 1930 Egyptian silent drama film directed by Mohammed Karim. It is based on the 1913 novel under the same name by Mohammed Hussein Heikal. The film stars Bahiga Hafez and Zaki Rostom.

== Plot ==
A love story between Zaynab who works as a wage earner on agricultural lands and Ibrahim who supervises the farming of these lands. Her family rejects their marriage and make her marry a wealthy man, while Ibrahim gets drafted in the army leaving his sweetheart behind.

== Staff ==
- Directed by: Mohammed Karim
- Written by: Mohammed Hussein Heikal
- Cinematography: Mohamed Abdel Azim, Hassan Murad, Gaston Madre
- Editing: Mohammed Karim
- Music: Bahiga Hafez
- Producer: Youssef Wahbi
- Production studio: Ramses Film

== Cast ==
=== Primary cast ===
- Bahiga Hafez as Zaynab
- Zaki Rostom as Hassan
- Sirag Mounir as Ibrahim
- Dawlat Abyad as Zaynab's mother
- Hassan Kamal as Mayor

=== Supporting cast ===
- Hussein Aser
- Alwiya Gamil
- Munira Ahmed
- Sayeda Fahmy
- Abdelkader El-Messiri
- Hassan Ahmadi
- Gamal Hosni

== See also ==
- Egyptian cinema
- List of Egyptian films of the 1930s
