= Searching for a Scandal =

- Directed by: Niazi Mostafa
- Written by: Farouk Sabri (screenplay & dialogue); Abul-Seoud El-Ebiary (story)
- Produced by: Gamal El-Leithy
- Starring: Adel Imam; Mervat Amin; Samir Sabri; Youssef Wahbi; Ahmed Ramzy; Emad Hamdy
- Release date: January 14, 1973
- Running time: 99 minutes (Note: Some Egyptian sources list a running time of 106 minutes.)
- Country: Egypt
- Languages: Arabic, Egyptian Arabic

Searching for a Scandal (Arabic: البحث عن فضيحة, romanized: Al-Baḥth ʿan Faḍīḥa) is a 1973 Egyptian comedy film directed by Niazi Mostafa. The screenplay was written by Farouk Sabri from a story by Abul-Seoud El-Ebiary, which was loosely based on the 1967 American comedy film A Guide for the Married Man. The film stars Adel Emam, Mervat Amin and Samir Sabri, with Youssef Wahby, Ahmed Ramzy, Emad Hamdy, Mohamed Awad, Zizi El-Badrawi, Tawfik El Deqn, George Sidhom, Mimi Shakib and Nabila El-Sayed in supporting roles.

Produced by Gamal El-Leithy, the film is best known today as the first starring vehicle of Adel Emam, who went on to become one of the most prominent actors in Egyptian and Arab cinema. It was released in Egyptian theatres on 14 January 1973.

== Plot ==
Magdy (Adel Emam) is a young civil engineer from Upper Egypt who moves to Cairo to work for a construction company. His father (Hamdi Salem) encourages him to find a wife in Cairo, believing that a marriage there would "improve the family's stock." At his new job, Magdy becomes friends with Sami (Samir Sabri), a more experienced colleague who is familiar with relationships and women. Magdy asks Sami to help him find a suitable bride. Sami takes him to a nightclub, where Magdy becomes attracted to a young woman named Hanan (Mervat Amin).

Sami warns Magdy not to rush into the relationship and tells him about Abdel Azim (George Sidhom), who once fell in love with a woman he did not know. He went to ask for her hand in marriage, only to discover that the man he believed was her father was actually her husband. Magdy and Sami later learn that Hanan is unmarried and lives with her father, Fahmy Bey (Youssef Wahby), and her mother (Mimi Shakib). Fahmy is wealthy and traditional, while Hanan's mother wants her to marry her wealthy but uninspiring cousin Rico (Naji Anjelo).

Sami then helps Magdy with several attempts to attract Hanan. He arranges a supposed chance meeting on the road and later hires a man to harass her so that Magdy can appear and rescue her. Neither plan works as intended, but Magdy and Hanan become closer and eventually decide to marry.

As Magdy prepares to ask Hanan's family for her hand, Sami tells him another cautionary story. Aziz (Mohamed Awad) once brought his entire family to a marriage proposal, but the meeting ended in a quarrel that turned violent between the two families. Magdy ignores the warning and goes ahead with the family visit, but Hanan's mother rejects the proposal. He then considers having Hanan kidnapped. Sami discourages him by telling him the story of Sabir (Tawfik El Deqn), whose kidnappers mistakenly abducted the mother of the woman he loved. Sabir was later committed to a psychiatric hospital.

Sami's last example concerns Fikri (Ahmed Ramzy), who wanted to marry Sanaa (Zizi El-Badrawi). Her parents refused because he was too early in his career to afford a home. Fikri climbed into Sanaa's bedroom at night and deliberately spoke loudly enough for her parents to hear, leading them to believe that she was pregnant. The parents then agreed to the marriage.

Magdy decides to use a similar plan with Hanan and sneaks into her room at night. His attempt quickly turns into a series of misunderstandings involving Abu Sari' (Mohamed Reda), the estate overseer, his wife (Awatef Ramadan), and their daughter Mas'ada (Nabila El-Sayed), who has been secretly brought to the house for a betrothal. Magdy and the others repeatedly mistake one person for another as they try to hide from each other. After the confusion is finally cleared up, Magdy and Hanan get married.

== Cast ==
Actor	Role
Adel Emam	Magdy
Mervat Amin	Hanan
Samir Sabri	Sami
Youssef Wahby	Fahmy Bey, Hanan's father
Ahmed Ramzy	Fikri
Emad Hamdy	Sanaa's father
Mohamed Awad	Aziz
Zizi El-Badrawi	Sanaa
Mohamed Reda	Abu Sari'
Tawfik El Deqn	Sabir
George Sidhom	Abdel Azim
Mimi Shakib	Hanan's mother
Nabila El-Sayed	Mas'ada
Zouzou Madi	Sanaa's mother
Naji Anjelo	Rico
Nagwa Fouad	Herself (guest appearance)
Hassan Hamed	House burglar
Salah Nazmi	Guest role
Nawal Abu El-Fotouh	Guest role
Awatef Ramadan	Abu Sari's wife

== Production ==
=== Background and adaptation ===
The film is widely reported to have been inspired by the 1967 American comedy A Guide for the Married Man, in which a married man receives advice from a friend on conducting an affair without being discovered. Film historian and novelist Mostafa Nasr has said that screenwriter Abul-Seoud El-Ebiary considered the film's treatment of infidelity unsuitable for Egyptian audiences at the time. He therefore adapted the premise for a different context: instead of teaching his friend how to have an affair, Sami teaches Magdy how to find a wife. The film consequently replaces the original's marital infidelity plot with a series of stories about courtship and marriage.

=== Casting ===
Searching for a Scandal is often described as the film that established Adel Emam as a leading actor. He had appeared in several earlier films, mostly in supporting roles, before producer Gamal El-Leithy cast him in the lead alongside Mervat Amin and Samir Sabri, both of whom were already established performers. The film also featured a number of prominent actors, including Youssef Wahby, Ahmed Ramzy, Emad Hamdy and Zizi El-Badrawi. Several of the older stars appeared in relatively small roles, reportedly as a gesture of support for Emam in his first leading role.

A number of casting changes were made before filming began. Farid Shawqi was reportedly considered for the role later played by Salah Nazmi, while Madiha Kamel was considered for the part eventually given to Nawal Abu El-Fotouh. Nour El-Sherif was also linked to the role later played by Mohamed Awad, and Safaa Abu El-Saud was considered for the role eventually played by Zizi El-Badrawi.

=== Budget and fees ===
Contemporary press reports based on production records gave the cast's fees as follows: Youssef Wahby received 1,100 Egyptian pounds, Mervat Amin 800, Adel Emam 750, Mohamed Reda 450, Ahmed Ramzy 400, and Samir Sabri 350. Tawfik El Deqn, Mimi Shakib and Nabila El-Sayed were paid 250 pounds each, while George Sidhom and Emad Hamdy received 200 pounds each. Zouzou Madi was paid 150 pounds.

== Release ==
The movie premiered in Egyptian cinemas on 14 January 1973 and was released in Kuwait later that year, on 4 August 1973. It has since become a fixture of Egyptian television rebroadcasts and streaming catalogues devoted to the "Golden Age" of Egyptian cinema.

== Reception and legacy ==
Searching for a Scandal is often associated with Adel Emam's emergence as a leading actor. Before the film, he had mainly appeared in supporting roles. Producer Gamal El-Leithy cast him as Magdy alongside Mervat Amin and Samir Sabri, who were already established actors. The film also included several well-known performers, among them Youssef Wahby, Ahmed Ramzy, Emad Hamdy and Zizi El-Badrawi. Their appearances were relatively brief compared with those of the three leads.

The film has continued to receive attention in Egyptian entertainment media, particularly in discussions of Emam's early career and the continued television screenings of older Egyptian films.

A new version of Searching for a Scandal was first announced in January 2024, with Karim Mahmoud Abdel Aziz attached to play Magdy and Rami Emam set to direct. The project was later reworked, with Hisham Maged taking the lead role and Rami Emam remaining as director. Sherif Ramzy joined the cast in 2025 in the role based on Sami, played by Samir Sabri in the original, while Hona El Zahed was also announced as part of the new cast.

The new film has been described as a contemporary adaptation of the original story. Hisham Maged said that the new version would retain the basic premise while changing the details to suit the present day. In 2025, reports said that the production had begun filming, but later reports indicated that the project was delayed. As of August 2026, the production was still awaiting the start of filming, with the cast and director having completed preparations.
