= Abdel Aziz Makhyoun =

Egyptian actor (1946–2026)

- عبد العزيز مخيون
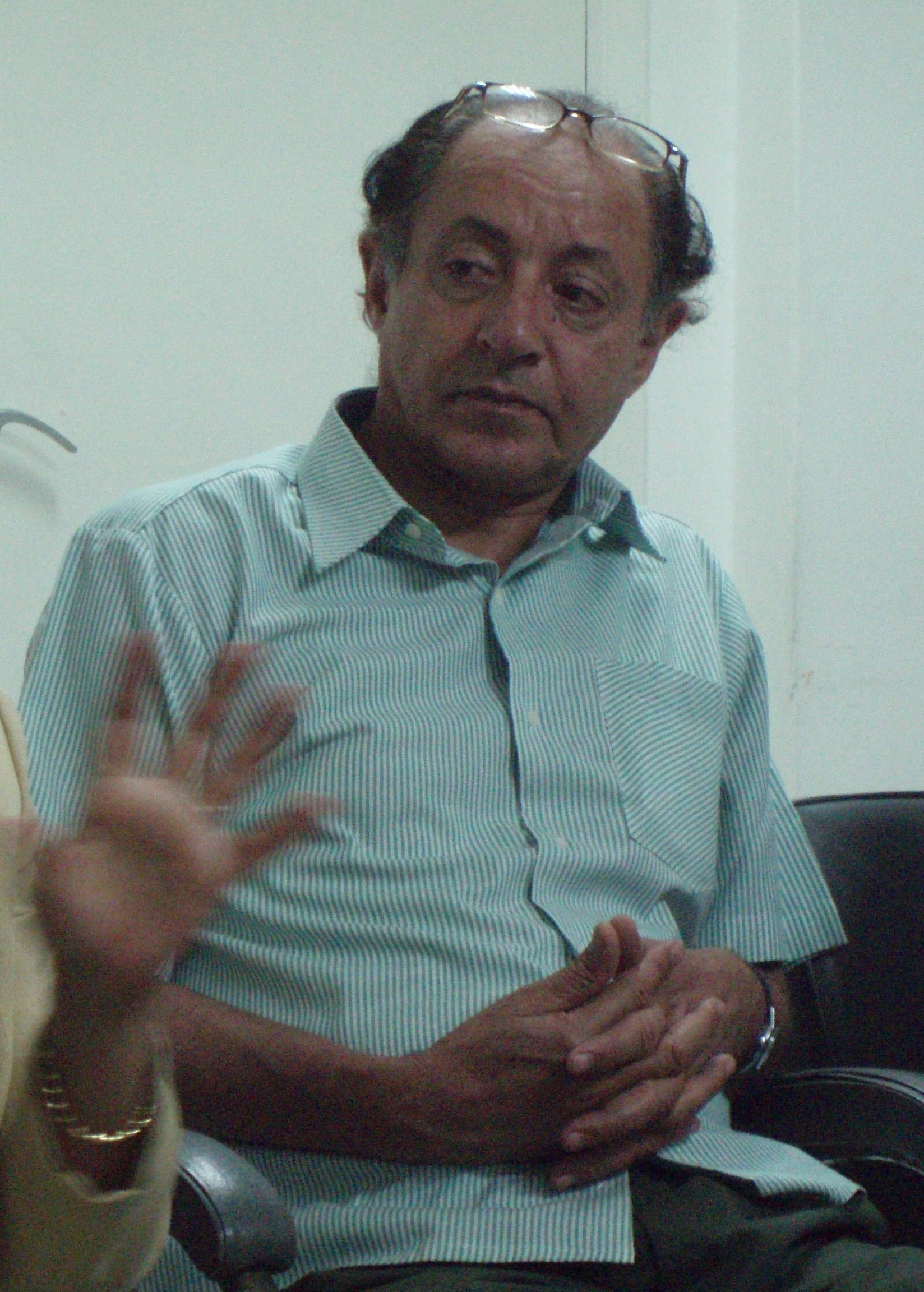
- Makhyoun in 2006
- Born: 25 February 1946
- Died: 10 June 2026 (aged 80)

Abdel Aziz Makhyoun (Egyptian Arabic: عبد العزيز مخيون; 25 February 1946 – 10 June 2026) was an Egyptian actor of film, television and stage, as well as a theatre director.

== Life and career ==
Abdel Aziz Makhyoun was born in Abu Hummus, Beheira Governorate on 25 February 1946. He graduated from the Higher Institute of Theatrical Arts in Egypt. Makhyoun then studied music and acting, joined the Television Theater Troupe, founded the Peasants' Theater, and worked as a theatre director.

He received a government scholarship to study theatre in France. Makhyoun was a prominent figure in the Kefaya opposition movement and had five children.

Makhyoun died on 10 June 2026, at the age of 80, after a battle with pneumonia.

== Filmography ==
| Year | Title | Role | |
|---|---|---|---|
| | Al Kit Kat | | Film |
| | El Mal wa El Banoun | | Film |
| 1967–1972 | Al Qahera Wel Nas | | TV Series |
| 1973 | Oghneyat elmoot | | Short |
| 1975 | Karnak | | Film |
| 1979 | Alexandria... Why? | | |
| 1982 | An Egyptian Story | | |
| 1981–1983 | Abwab Al Madina | Abdelrafe Mokhtar | TV Series |
| 1985 | The Honey and the Tears | Waheed | TV Series |
| 1986 | The Hunger | | Film |
| 1986 | Agras el-Khatar | Awwadh Awadh | |
| 1986 | Lel-Hubb Qissah Akhirah | Dr. Hussain | |
| 1986 | Imraah Mutallaqah | Judge | |
| 1986 | Dream travel | Adel | TV Mini Series |
| 1986 | Al-gough | | |
| 1987 | Bir el-Kheyanah | Israeli officer - Abo Dawood | |
| 1987 | El Bashayer | Hisham Sabri | TV Series |
| 1988 | Thaman Al Khawf | | TV Mini Series |
| 1989 | Bab Sharq | | |
| 1990 | Taht El Sifr | Wagih | |
| 1991 | The Escape | Major Salem Sidan | |
| 1991 | Ya Mhallabiyyah Ya | | |
| 1991 | Beggars and Noblemen | Noor El Din | |
| 1992 | Sayedat Al-Qahira | Yehia | |
| 1992 | Bint Siadat El-Wazeer | Mounir Kamel | TV Series |
| 1992 | A Woman Capable of Falling | Waiter Hamdi | |
| 1993 | Fares al-madina | Adham Al Wazzan | |
| 1993 | Mekanika | Nancy Butler | TV Series |
| 1996 | Saken Ossady | | TV Series |
| 1997 | Harun al-Rashid | Muhammad ibn Sulayman | TV Series |
| 1997 | Hassan Ellol | Mustafa el-Arabi | |
| 1997 | Zeezinya | Adel Abu Lailah | TV Series |
| 1998 | Mogrem Maa Martabet El-Sharaf | Emad | |
| 1998 | Zahrat Abbad el-Shams | | TV Movie |
| 1999 | Om Kulthum | Mohamed Abdel Wahab | TV Mini Series |
| 1999 | El-Farah | | |
| 2000 | El-Nims | Al Shaikh Najeeb | |
| 2000 | Full el-Full | Investigator | |
| 2001 | Hafar al bahr | | |
| 2002 | Amira fi Abdeen | Chief Prosecutor | TV Series |
| 2002 | Zaman Emad Eldin | Ismail Effehdi abdelrahman | TV Series |
| 2002 | Didi & Dolly | Rashad | TV Series |
| 2002 | Awraq Messriya | Henry Curiel | TV Series |
| 2003 | Malafat Serya | Lotfi Hashem | TV Series |
| 2005 | Dam el ghazal | Nadyah Safwan's husband | |
| 2006 | The Cinderella (Soad Hosni) | Muhammad Abdulwahab | TV Series |
| 2007 | Kharej ala el kanoun | | |
| 2008 | Zayy el-Nahardah | Ayman's father | |
| 2009 | Dokkan Shehata | Dr. Munes | |
| 2009 | Isma'il Yassin (Abu Dehka Genan) | Mohammad Abdel Wahab | TV Series |
| 2009 | Ibn Al Arandali | | TV Series |
| 2010 | The Ring Road | Rifat Ridhwan | |
| 2011–2012 | Mosharafa: A Man of This Time | Ahmed Lotify El Sayed | TV Series |
| 2012 | Al Horoub | Abdel Nasser | TV Series |
| 2012 | Farouk Omar | Abu Talib - Abu Talib ibn Abdul Mutalib | TV Series |
| 2014 | The Tea Cart | | Short |
| 2015 | The Price | Gulal Mahmood | |
| 2016 | Elbar El Tani | Abu-Said | |
| 1987–2016 | Al Helmeya Nights | Taha Alsmahi | TV Series |
| 2017 | The Brotherhood 2 | Hassan al-hudaybi | TV Series |
| 2010–2017 | El-Gamaah | Bahjat AbdulHameed Al Sarwah - Hassan Ismael Al Hudaybi | TV Series |
| 2017 | The Treasure: Truth and Imagination | Wiseman Eni | Film |
| 2019 | The Treasure 2 | Eni | |
| 2020 | Every Week Has a Friday | Gaber | TV Mini Series |
| 2020 | High Fences | Hagg Farooq | |
| 2020 | The Prince | Hamed | TV Series |
| 2020 | Aswaar Aalya | | Film |
| 2022 | Ghamam's Island | El Shiekh Madian | TV Series |
| 2022 | Enheraf | | TV Series |
| 2023 | Al Maddah 3: Ostorat Al Eshq | Al Amir | TV Series |
| 2023–2024 | Belly of the Whale | Mousa | TV Series |
| 2024–2025 | Gawdar: Alf Leyla W Leyla | Abdulllah Al-Hattab | TV Mini Series |
| 2025 | Sawa Sawa | Shafiq | TV Series |
| 2026 | Efrag | | TV Series |
