= The 3rd Class =

Al-Darga Al-Thalitha
- Directed by: Sherif Arafa
- Written by: Maher Awad
- Produced by: Arab Egyptian Films
- Starring: Soad Hosni; Ahmed Zaki
- Release date: 1988
- Country: Egypt
- Language: Arabic

The 3rd Class (Arabic: الدرجة الثالثة, translit. Al-Darja Al-Thalitha) is a 1988 Egyptian comedy/drama movie, starring Soad Hosni and Ahmed Zaki.

== Cast ==
- Soad Hosni as Na'ana'a.
- Ahmed Zaki
- Gamil Ratib
- Sanaa’ Younis
- Abdel Azim Abdel Hak

== See also ==
- Egyptian films of the 1980s
- List of Egyptian films of 1988
