= Tarek El-Telmissany =

Egyptian cinematographer and actor

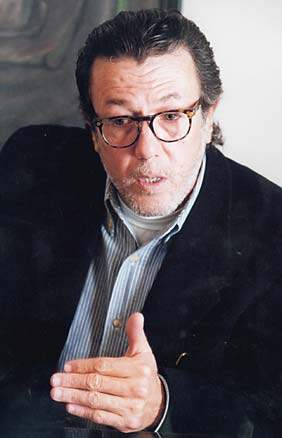
- El-Telmissany at one of his interviews.
- Born: April 22, 1950 (age 76); Cairo, Egypt
- Occupations: Director of Photography and Actor. [director for 1 time]

Tarek El-Telmissany (Arabic: طارق التلمساني; April 22, 1950) is an Egyptian actor and cinematographer, who is known in the Middle East and Africa. Worked as a Director of Photography for documentary films since 1980. A Director of Photography at the National Cinema Center since 1983.

Tarek El-Telmissany developed his approach to lighting while studying at the Gerasimov All-Russian State Institute of Cinematography ("VGIK") in Russia.

He is also credited as Tariq El Telmesani, Tarek Al Telmissany.

== Early life ==
El-Telmissany was born in Cairo, in a very artistic family.

His uncle was Kamel El-Telmissany was a leading artist. Together with Ramses Younan, Adam Henein, Fouad Kamel and others he was a founder of Art and Liberty in the 1940s. Kamel then ventured into narrative cinema, initially to further propagate the group's brand of surrealism. He soon moved into realist mode, directing the landmark Al-Souq Al-Souda (Black Market) which was banned for almost four years.

His father Hassan, followed Kamel into film, becoming a cinematographer employed by Shell Oil's filmmaking department which produced films about all aspects of Egyptian life – cultural, economic and social. Shell had sent Hassan to train in London and later, when the department shut down, he became an independent documentary filmmaker, producing some 20 films with El-Telmissany's uncle Abdel-Qader. Together they formed a company named El-Telmissany Ekhan for producing many important documentary films.

It was El-Telmissani's mother, a housewife, who first opened his eyes to the world of cinema and filmmaking. She accompanied him to Metro movie theatre to watch children's films and when he was nine brought him to studio Nasbian in Al- Dhaher -- "now it has become a pickle store"—where his uncle (Kamel) was shooting his last film, Al-Nas Eli That (People at the Bottom), with Youssef Wahbi and Mary Munib

== Education ==
After graduating from Faculty of Languages (Al Alsun) in 1973 El-Telmissany received a scholarship to study Russian culture and language in the Soviet Union. At the time he had also been accepted by the National Film School in London. He was told by his father: "If you want to learn the art go to Moscow, if you want to be a professional camera operator go to London. And then you can always continue your training with me." He got Licentiate in Russian language from Faculty of Alsun 1973. Master's degree in Cinema Photography - VGIK Moscow (1981).

== Family ==
El-Telmissany was married in 1979 to a Russian girl named Galina Noskova during his study in Russia. He has 2 children; both Abeer (daughter) and Taymoor (son) are engineers. He is the grandfather of 2 children, (Youssef and Adam).

== Career life ==
He started as a Director of Photography for featured films in 1983, in film Kharaga Wa lam Ya'od-خرج و لم يعد (1983) for director Mouhamed Khan. He made over 53-featured films. The last released film was Adrenalin – ادرينالين (2009) for director Mahmoud Kamel. He managed directing and photography of more than 30 documentary films and 100 commercials. He directed 1 film named Dahk Wa Le'ab Wa Gad Wa Hob in 1993.

He has a unique style in lighting which he gained from his professors in Russia. "You're not capturing an image, you're writing it. Touch the celluloid as if you're caressing the woman you most desire. Look through the lens as if it is the last time you see her body; light it as if it is the only way you can embrace her." That's what they told Tarek El-Telmissany in film school, he says.

Because of his European look, he recently featured as an actor in some TV series and some films.

He is one of the pioneers to shoot digital films in Egypt.

== Awards ==
He received many awards for best D.O.P inside and outside of Egypt, from festivals like Cairo International Film Festival, M-NET festival in South Africa, Mediterranean Countries Festival and many other festivals in Morocco, Algeria, the Netherlands, France and other countries. The latest award was in November 2013 in the National Egyptian Film Festival for his total works.

== Frequent collaborators ==
- Mohamed Khan
- Khairy Beshara
- Osama Fauzy
- Radwan El-Kashef
- Salah Abu Seif
- Faten Hamama

== Filmography ==
=== Notable Films ===
- Al Tawk Wa Al Eswera (1985)
- Yawm Mor Wa Yawm Helw (1988)
- Ayam El Ro'ab (1988)
- Al Bahth A'n Said Marzok (1989)
- Al Mwaten Masry (1990)
- Al Raii Wal Nissaa(1991)
- Afarit El Asfalt (1995)
- Arak El Balah (1996)
- Ganet Al Shayateen (1998)
- Ayam El-Sadat (2000)
- Aas We Laze' (2006)
