= Easabat Al'nisa =

1986 Egyptian film

- Directed by: Mohamed Abaza
- Produced by: Mohamed Abaza and Essam Al Gamblaty
- Release date: 1986
- Running time: Egypt
- Language: Modern Standard Arabic

Ihtaras Easabat Al'nisaa (English: Watch out for the women gang) is a 1986 Egyptian movie directed and written by Mohamed Abaza and co-written by Essam Al Gamblaty.

== Plot ==
The leader of a criminal gang known for smuggling diamond has a journalist on her tail who wants to reveal her identity. In the quest to capture another criminal called Shaukat, she hosts a chess game, because she is good in the game.

== Cast ==
- Samir Ghanem
- Elham Shahin
- Sayed Zayan
- Sawsan Badr
- Hadi Al Jayyar
- Vivian Salah Eldin
- Azza Gamal El-Din
- Adel Abd Elmenaem
- Menirva
- Mahmoud El Zohairy
- Aml Ibrahim
- Nasr Hammad
