= Fatima Rushdi =

Egyptian actress (1908–1996)

- فاطمة رشدي
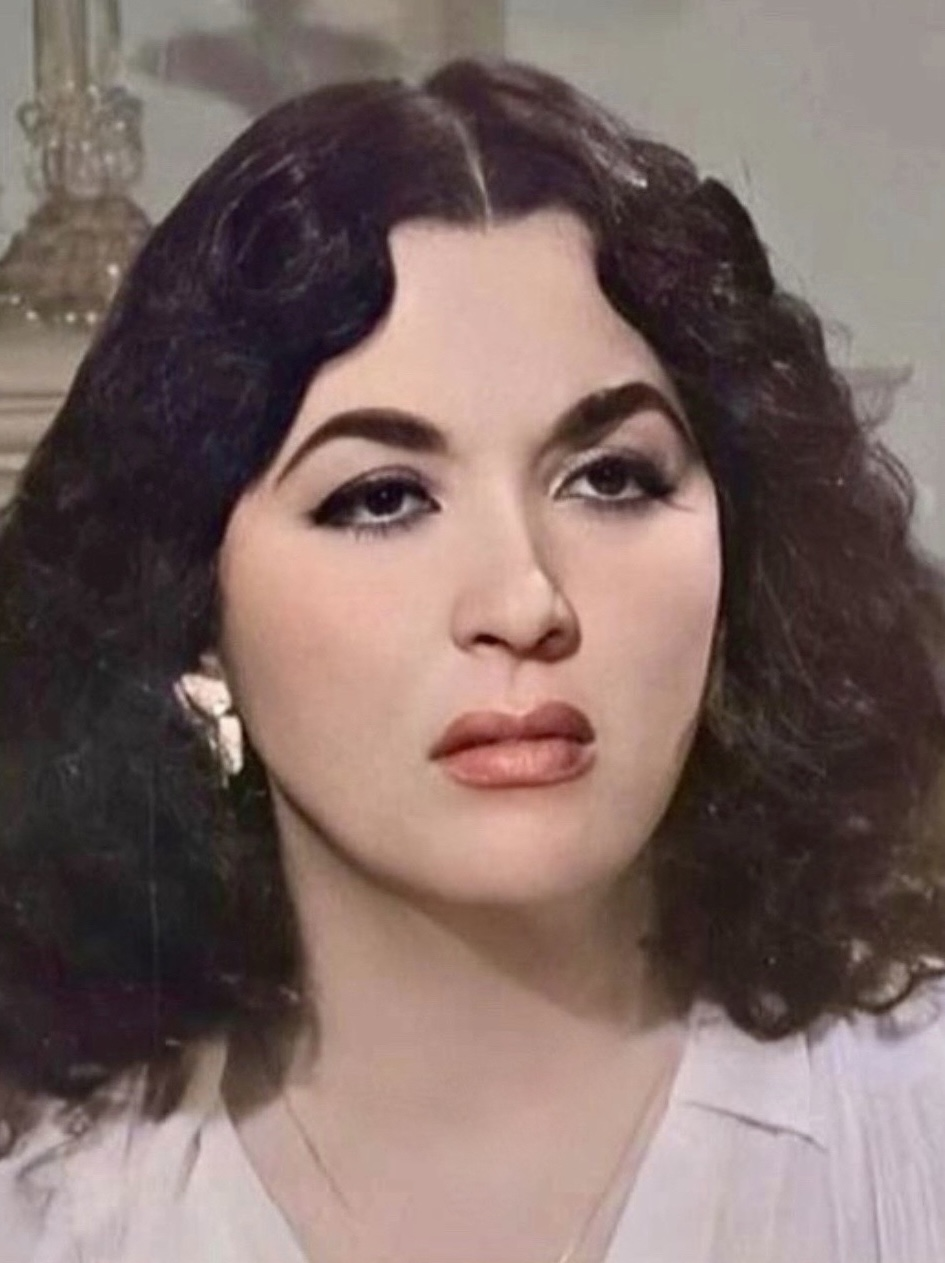
- Fatima Rushdi in 1941
- Born: November 15, 1908; Alexandria, Egypt
- Died: January 23, 1996 (aged 87); Cairo, Egypt
- Other names: Queen of theatres Sarah Bernard of the East
- Citizenship: Egypt
- Occupations: Actress, film director
- Years active: 1928–1969
- Spouse(s): Aziz Eid; Kamal Selim; Mohammed Abdelgawad

Fatima Rushdi (Arabic: فاطمة رشدي; November 15, 1908 – January 23, 1996) was an Egyptian actress, singer, film director, and producer who was one of the pioneers of Egyptian cinema.

== Early life ==
Born in Alexandria, Fatima Rushdi moved to Cairo at 14 to become an actress. Without any formal training, and speaking only Egyptian Arabic, she started her own theatrical troupe in 1926 and travelled throughout North Africa. Theater director Aziz Eid fell in love with her and enabled her to learn to read and write. She became known as the "Sarah Bernhardt of the Orient" for reprising many of Sarah Bernhardt's famous roles, including Mark Anthony in Julius Caesar.

== Career ==
In the late 1920s, Rushdi went on acting tours abroad. She acted in Beirut, Jaffa, Haifa, Latakia, Baghdad, and in Tunisia and Algeria. She also sailed to South America and acted in Santos, São Paulo, Rio de Janeiro, and Buenos Aires.

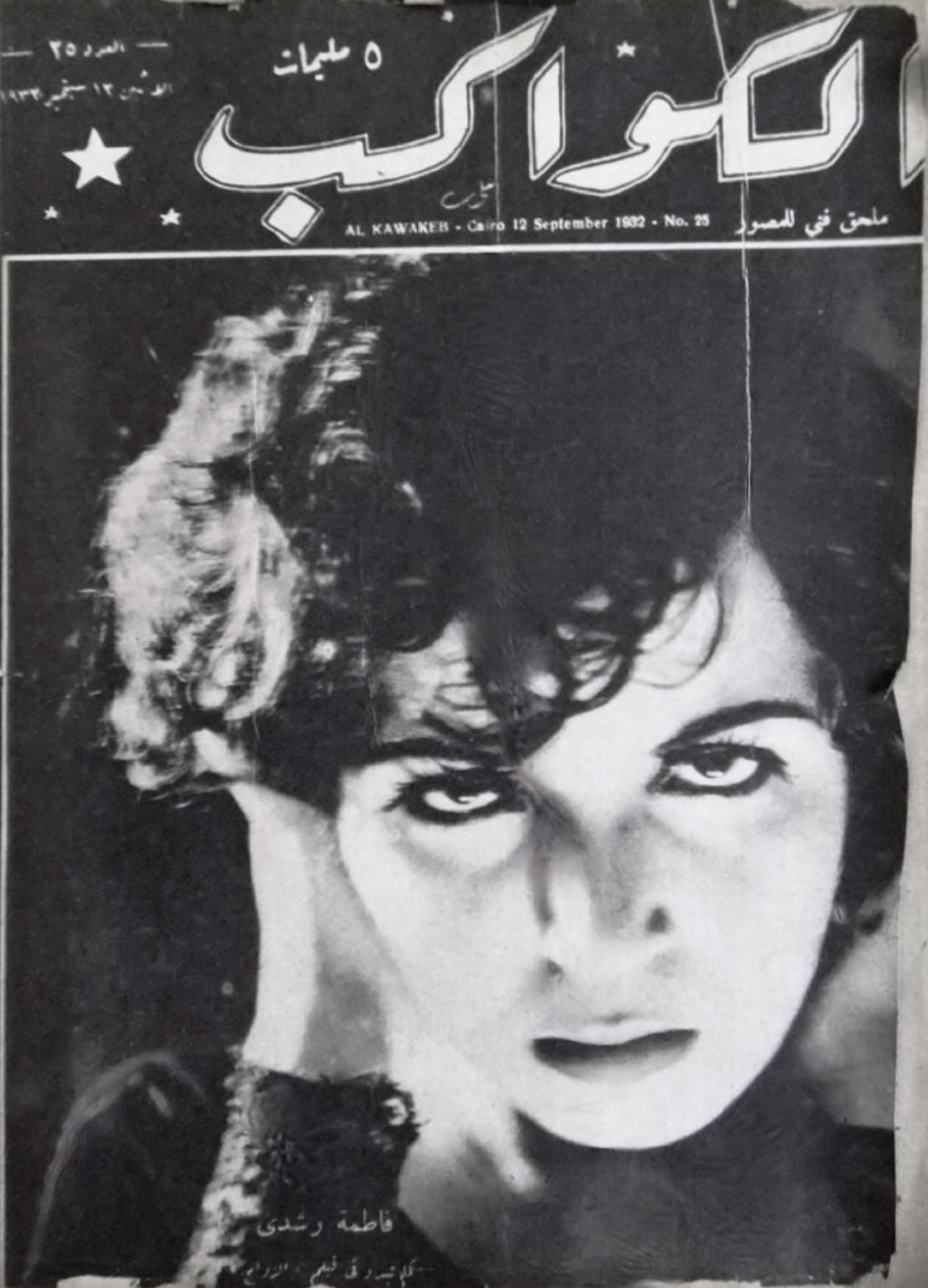
Fatima Rushdi on the cover of Al-Kawakib magazine, September 1932

Her first film appearance was in Ibrahim Lama's Faji`a Fawq Al-Haram in 1928. In 1933, she directed her first and only film, al-Zawaj, which premiered in Paris. No surviving copies are known, and in her 1970 memoir, she claimed to have burned the completed film. In the film, she starred as a woman pushed into an unhappy marriage by her father who dies tragically at the end.

She acted in several films by Kamal Selim, including the realist film The Will al-`Azima (1939), where she played a young working-class girl falling in love with the neighbour's son. Her last screen appearance was in 1955, in a secondary role in Ahmed Diaa Eddine's Da`uni A`ish / Let Me Live. In the 1960s, Rushdi and Hussien Pasha Ghannam hosted a salon for filmmakers and students at the Higher Institute of Cinema.

== Later life ==
After several films in secondary roles, Rushdi retired from acting in the late 1960s. The limelight receded from her with age and the loss of health and wealth.

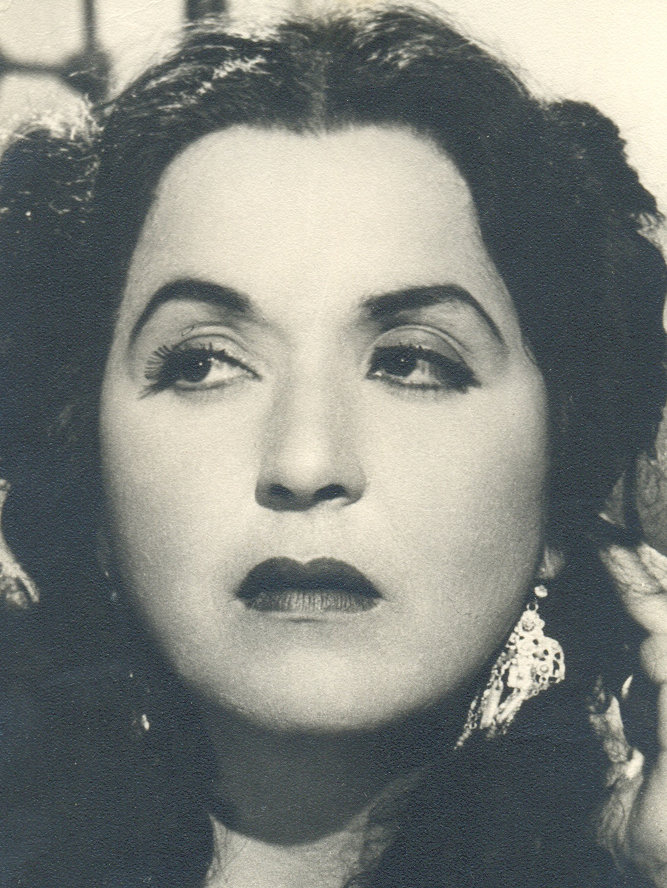
Fatma Rushdi in the 1950s

She was living in her last days in a room in one of the hotels in downtown Cairo, until the Egyptian newspaper Al-Wafd revealed her miserable life, and Farid Shawqi intervened with the Government to provide her with health insurance and provide adequate housing. And that actually happened. She got an apartment, but fate did not give her time to enjoy what the state offered her. She died alone, leaving behind a huge legacy of more than 200 plays and 16 films, and a life she lived long and wide during which she lived with a generation of theater giants and moviegoers. She died on January 23, 1996, corresponding to Ramadan 3, 1416 AH, at the age of 87 years.

== Selected filmography ==
- 1928: A Tragedy on the Pyramids
- 1928: Under the Sky of Egypt
- 1932: Marriage
- 1936: The Fugitive
- 1939: The Price of Happiness
- 1939: The Will
- 1941: Forebear
- 1943: The Worker
- 1944: The Straight Path
- 1945: Girls of the Countryside
- 1945: Gypsy City
- 1946: The Love of the Sheikhs
- 1946: Storms
- 1946: The Reckless
- 1948: The Sad Countryside
- 1955: Let Me Live
- 1955: Body

== See also ==
- Egyptian cinema
- List of Egyptian films of the 1930s
- List of Egyptian films of the 1940s
