= The Pickpocket (1970 film) =

- سارق المحفظة
- Directed by: Zoheir Bakir
- Written by: Yousry Hakim
- Starring: Rushdy Abaza; Soheir El-Morshidy; Mervat Amin
- Production company: Omayya Films
- Release date: February 2, 1970
- Running time: 105 minutes
- Country: Egypt
- Language: Arabic

The Pickpocket (Arabic: سارق المحفظة, transliterated as Sareq al-Ma’faza) is an Egyptian film released on February 2, 1970. The film is directed and written by Zoheir Bakir, features a screenplay by Yousry Hakim, and stars Rushdy Abaza, Soheir El-Morshidy, Mervat Amin, and Nabil Al-Hajrasi.

== Cast ==
- Rushdy Abaza (Tariq)
- Soheir El-Morshidy (Souad)
- Mervat Amin (Ehsan)
- Nabil Al-Hajrasi (Jamil)

== Synopsis ==
Tariq al-Fangari is a miserly man whose sisters suffer from his parsimony. When police shoot a pickpocket to death on a bus, the man’s wallet is swapped for that of Tariq and his siblings think that he is the deceased, leading him to ponder his life.
