= Elham Shahin =

Egyptian actress (born 1961)

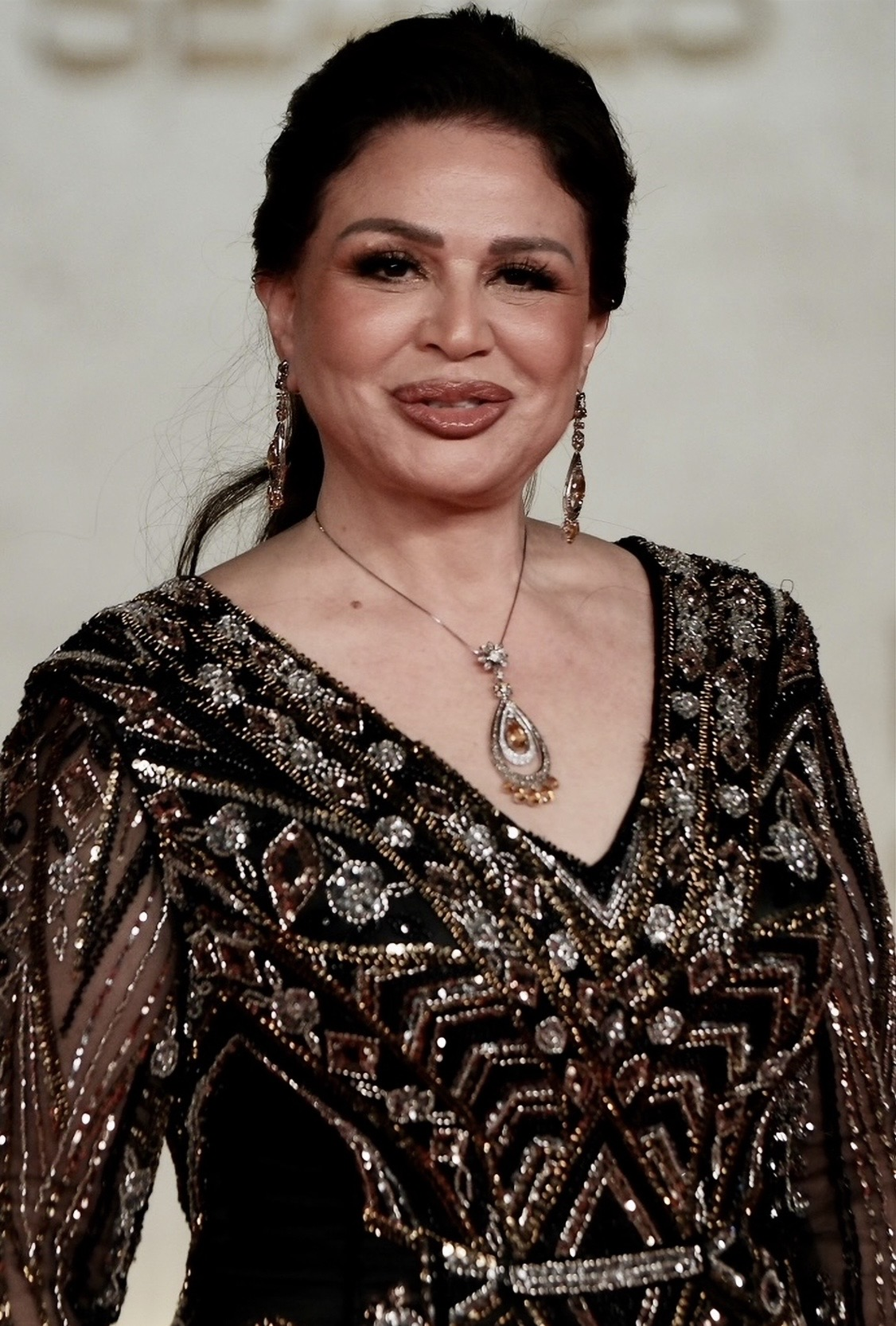
- Shahin in 2025
- Born: Elham El Sayed Ahmed Shahin; 3 January 1961 (age 65); Cairo, Egypt
- Occupations: Actress; film producer
- Years active: 1981–present

Elham Shahin (Arabic: إلهام شاهين, also spelled Ilham Shaheen, Ilham Shahin, Ilham Chahine, and Elham Shaheen) is an Egyptian actress.

She has appeared in many Egyptian films and television series and has won both Egyptian and international awards.

In 2021, she played a prostitute in the Jean-Paul Sartre play The Respectful Prostitute. Haaretz reported that this "caused political turmoil in Egypt".

== Selected filmography ==
=== Film ===
List of film appearances, with year, title, and role shown
Year	Title	Role
1985	Al Halfout	Warda
1986	The Innocent	Nawwara
1986	Easabat Al'nisa	

=== Television ===
List of television appearances, with year, title, and role shown
Year	Title	Role
1982	Rihlat Azab	Soad
1987	Escape to Prison	Mona
