= The Wife of an Important Man =

The Wife of an Important Man زوجة رجل مهم
- Directed by: Mohamed Khan
- Produced by: Hussein El-Qala
- Starring: Ahmad Zaki; Mervat Amin
- Cinematography: Mohsen Ahmed
- Edited by: Nadia Shoukry
- Music by: Georges Kazazian
- Production companies: International Television and Cinema Company (Hussein El-Qala)
- Distributed by: International Television and Cinema Company (Hussein El-Qala)
- Release date: January 11, 1988
- Running time: 115 Minutes
- Country: Egypt
- Language: Egyptian Arabic

The Wife of an Important Man (Arabic: زوجة رجل مهم, translit. zawgat ragol mohim) is a 1988 Egyptian drama film directed by Mohamed Khan. It stars Ahmad Zaki and Mervat Amin, the film tells us the story of the rise and fall of a police officer during the regime of Anwar El Sadat. It is one of the Top 100 Egyptian films.

== Synopsis ==
When Mona marries the seemingly decent police officer Hisham, she finds out there is more into him than what he shows to the people. Mona's life turns into hell, as he deprives her of all worldly pleasures, not to mention his mistreatment of everyone around him, even his neighbors. The film documents many political, economic, and social events in the lives of this small family, in a dramatic and realistic atmosphere.

== Cast ==
- Ahmad Zaki as Hesham
- Mervat Amin as Mona
- Zizi Mustafa as Samiha
- Ali Al-Ghandour as Ismail - Mona's father
- Hassan Hosni as Assistant Minister of Interior
- Nazim Shaarawy as Director of State Security Investigations Service
- Nahed Samir as Hesham's aunt
- Othman Abdel Moneim as Director of Minya Security
- Abdel Ghani Nasser as Senior State Official
- Khairy Beshara as Safwat
- Mohamed Dardiri as Writer Magdy Ezz El-Arab
- Tarek Mandour as Hesham's driver
- Ahmed Mokhtar as Major Fawzy
- Wagih Agami as Ibrahim - Hesham's correspondent
- Jihan Nasr as Mona as a child
- Hafez Amin as Beshara
- Alia Ali as Mona's mother
- Thuraya Ezz El-Din as The Assistant Minister's wife
- Abdel Halim Hafez as Himself (archive footage)

== Reception ==
It received the Silver Award at the Damascus International Film Festival in 1987, and was screened in competition at the 15th Moscow International Film Festival in 1987. Was also screened at the Montreal, Valencia, Tetouan, Digne, Istanbul and Nantes Film Festivals in 1987 and 1988.
