= List of Egyptian films of 1934 =

A list of films produced in Egypt in 1934. For an A-Z list of films currently on Wikipedia, see Category:Egyptian films.

Title	Director	Cast	Genre	Notes
Laylat Al-Omear (The Night of a Lifetime)	Mohamed Bayoumi	Amina Mohamed, Ahmad Farid		
Ouyoun Sahirah (Enchanting Eyes)	Ahmed Galal	Ahmed Galal, Assia Dagher		
Al-Ittiham (The Accusation)	Mario Volpi	Bahiga Hafez, Zaki Rostom		
Ibn Al-Cha'b (The Son of the People)	Maurice Aptekman	Serag Mounir, Mimi Chakib, Badia Masabni		
Al-Mandouban (The Two Delegates)	Togo Mizrahi	Fawzi al-Gazaerli, Shalom		
Chabah Al-Madi (The Shadow of the Past)	Ibrahim Lama	Badr Lama, Nadra		
Sahib al-sa'adah Kechkech bey (His Excellency Kechkech Bey)	Naguib el-Rihani, Stéphane Rosti	Naguib el-Rihani, Stéphane Rosti		Talkie version of the 1931 film
