= Return of a Citizen =

1986 film

Return of a Citizen عودة مواطن
- Directed by: Mohamed Khan
- Starring: Mervat Amin
- Edited by: Nadia Chukri
- Release date: 13 October 1986
- Country: Egypt
- Language: Egyptian Arabic

Return of a Citizen (Arabic: عودة مواطن, translit. Awdat mowatin) is a 1986 Egyptian drama film directed by Mohamed Khan. It was screened out of competition at the 1987 Cannes Film Festival.

== Cast ==
- Mervat Amin
- Yehia El-Fakharany
- Ahmed Abdelaziz
- Abdel Moneim Ibrahim
- Sherif Mounir
- Husien Sherbini
- Ibrahim Youssri
- Magda Zaki
