= List of Egyptian films of 1937 =

A list of films produced in Egypt in 1937. For an A-Z list of films currently on Wikipedia, see Category:Egyptian films.

Title	Director	Cast	Genre	Notes
Salama fi khayr (Salama Is Okay)	Niazi Mustafa	Naguib el-Rihani, Raqiya Ibrahim	Comedy	
Tita Wong	Amina Mohamed	Amina Mohamed		
Nashid al-Amal (The Song of Hope)	Ahmed Badrakhan	Umm Kulthum	Musical	
