= Bahiga Hafez =

Egyptian actress (1901–1983)

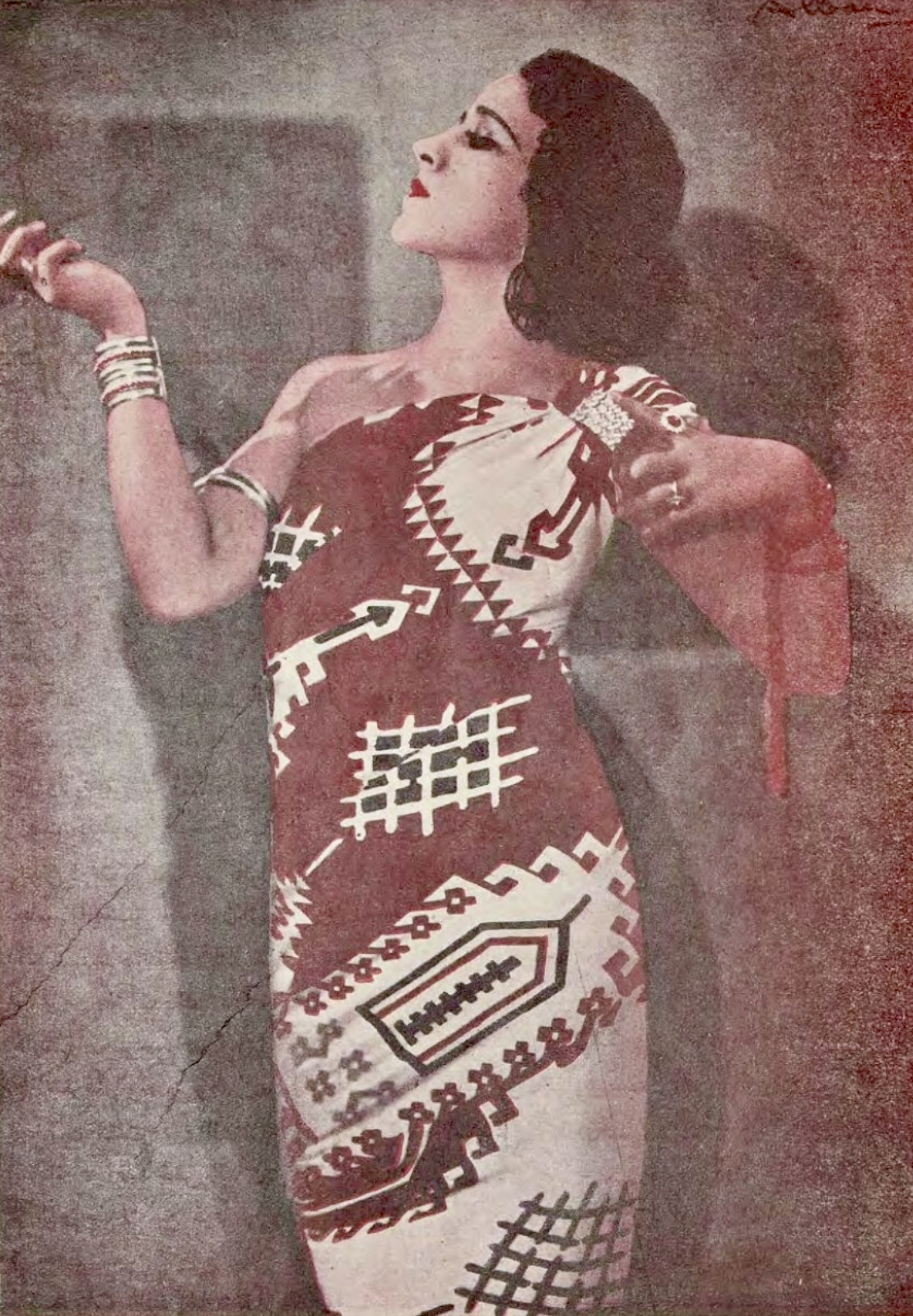
- Born: August 4, 1908; Alexandria, Khedivate of Egypt
- Died: December 13, 1983 (aged 75); Cairo, Egypt
- Occupations: Actress, Composer, Director, Editor, Producer, Screenwriter
- Years active: 1930s–1940s, 1966

Bahiga Hafez (Arabic: بهيجة حافظ, 13 December 1908 – 4 August 1983) was an Egyptian screenwriter, composer, director, editor, producer and actress.

== Personal life ==
Bahiga Hafez was born and raised in Alexandria, Egypt, to an aristocratic family with ties to monarchy. Hafez began studying music in Cairo and later went on to study musical composition and piano in Paris. Hafez could speak French, Arabic, and other languages. Hafez was the daughter of Ismail Pacha Hafez, who played the oud and was a great lover of music.

After returning to Egypt, she lived in Cairo where she held literary salons. Also upon her return to Egypt, Hafez released record entitled Bahiga, that was played on the radio. In 1930, after having played the title role in the silent film Zeinab, her family disinherited her, since working in cinema was seen as shameful, especially for someone of her social status.

== Career ==
Hafez has been cited as one of the pioneering women in Egyptian cinema. She started her career in film as an actress in the silent film Zaynab, directed by Mohammed Karim, for which she also composed the musical score. Karim had been searching for an actress for the title role, and after meeting Hafez at a party, offered her the role. The film itself was quite popular.

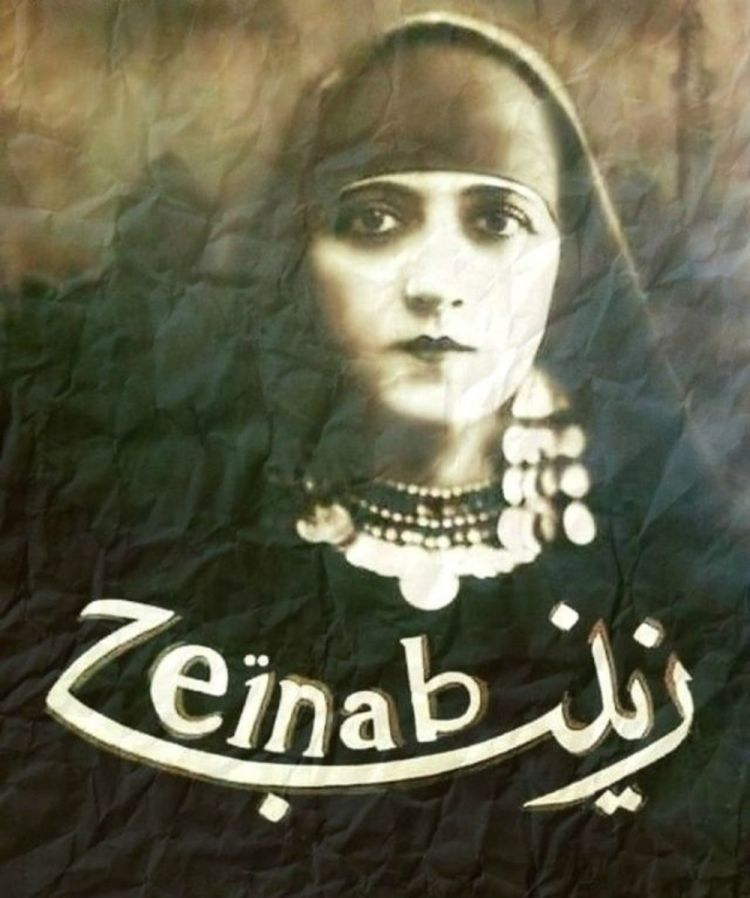
Bahiga Hafez in Zaynab (1930)

Hafez founded the company Fanar Films in 1932. With Fanar Films, Hafez co-directed the film al-Dahaya (1932), called The Victims in English, in which she also played a major role. She was also the costume designer, composer and editor for the film. Three years later she remade the film with sound. Hafez's first solo directed film was Laila bint al-sahara (Laila the Desert Girl), 1937 (Alternative title: Laila bint al-Badawiyya), which was only released in 1944 with a new title, Layla al-Badawiyya (Layla the Bedouin). She worked as director, producer (with Fanar Films), co-screenwriter, composer, and lead actress. The film was to be premiered at the Venice Film Festival in 1938 but was banned in Egypt due to its negative depictions of Persians, especially Persian royalty since it was to be released the same year as the wedding of the Shah of Persia and the Princess Fawzia of Egypt. Eventually, the film was no success.

After not working in film for quite some time, Hafez was asked by director Salah Abou Seif to star as one of the princesses in his 1966 film Cairo 30. This was both her return to cinema and also her last appearance. Much of her work as a filmmaker has been lost and only written records of her work remain. In 1995 a copy of her film al-Dahaya was found.

== Filmography ==
Year	Title	English title	Credit	Notes
1930	Zaynab		Actress, composer	Hafez's first acting role
1932	al-Dahaya	The Victims	Actress, co-director, costume designer, editor, producer	Silent Film - directed by Ibrahim Lama
1934	el Ittihâm	The Accusation	Actress, producer	Directed by Mario Volpi
1935	al-Dahaya	The Victims	Actress, director, producer	Remake of the 1932 film with sound
1937	Laila bint al-sahara	Laila the Desert Girl	Actress, composer, co-screenwriter, director, producer	Alternative titles: Laila bint al-Badawiyya
1944	Layla al-Badawiyya	Layla the Bedouin	Actress, composer, co-screenwriter, director, producer	Re-release of the original movie
1947	Zahra		Actress, producer	Alternate title: Zohra
1966	el Qâhirah talâtîn	Cairo 30	Actress	Directed by Salah Abou Seif
