= List of Egyptian films of 1984 =

A list of films produced in Egypt in 1984. For an A-Z list of films currently on Wikipedia, see Category:Egyptian films.

Title	Director	Cast	Genre	Notes
Al-avokato (The Advocate)	Raafat El-Mihi	Adel Emam, Yousra	Comedy	
Ana Elli Katalt Elhanash (I Killed Alhanash)	Ahmed El-Sabawy	Adel Emam, Saeed Saleh, Youssef Chaban, Safia El Emari	Crime	
Ehtares Min Alkhot (Beware of Alkhot)	Samir Seif	Adel Emam, Lebleba, Samir Sabri	Comedy	
Ethnein Ala Al Tariq (Two on the Road)	Hassan Yousef	Adel Emam, Shams El-Barudy, Adel Adham	Drama / comedy / romance	
Hata La Yatir Al Dokhan (As Not to Fly the Smoke)	Ahmed Yehia	Adel Emam, Soheir Ramzy	Drama	
Meen Fena El-Haramy? (Which of Us is the Thief?)	Mohamed Abdel Aziz	Adel Emam, Sherihan	Comedy / Crime	
Waheda Bewaheda (Tit for Tat)	Nader Galal	Adel Emam, Mervat Amin, Ahmed Rateb	Comedy / drama	
