= List of Egyptian films of 1948 =

A list of films produced in Egypt in 1948. For an A-Z list of films currently on Wikipedia, see Category:Egyptian films.

| Title | Director | Cast | Genre | Notes |
|---|---|---|---|---|
| Khulood (Immortality) | Ezzel Dine Zulficar | Kamal al-Shennawi, Faten Hamama, Ismail Yasseen | Romance | |
| Fatah Min Falastin (A Girl from Palestine) | Mahmoud Zulfikar | Mahmoud Zulfikar, Soad Mohammed | War | |
| Al-Millionairah al-Saghirah (The Small Millionaire) | Kamal Barakat | Rushdy Abaza, Faten Hamama | Drama | |
| Mughamarat Antar wa Abla (The Adventures of Antar and Abla) | Salah Abu Seif | Seraj Munir, Kouka | Action | Entered into the 1949 Cannes Film Festival |
