= List of Egyptian films of 1988 =

A list of films produced in Egypt in 1988. For an A-Z list of films currently on Wikipedia, see Category:Egyptian films.

Title	Director	Cast	Genre	Notes
El-Osta El-Modeer (Monsieur le Directeur)	Nagy Anglo	Salah Zulfikar, Laila Taher	Drama	
Al-Darga Al-Thalitha (The 3rd Class)	Sherif Arafa	Ahmed Zaki, Soad Hosny	Drama / comedy	
Imra’a Lel Asaf (Unfortunately Woman)	Nadia Hamza	Salah Zulfikar, Yousra	Drama	
Ayam Al Ro’ab (Days of Terror)	Said Marzouk	Salah Zulfikar, Mahmoud Yassin, Mervat Amin	Thriller	
