= List of Egyptian films of 1944 =

A list of films produced in Egypt in 1944. For an A-Z list of films currently on Wikipedia, see Category:Egyptian films.

Title	Director	Cast	Genre	Notes
El Boassa (The Miserables)	Kamal Selim	Abbas Fares, Amina Rizk	Drama	
Gharam wa intiqam (Love and Revenge)	Youssef Wahbi	Asmahan, Anwar Wagdi, Youssef Wahbi	Drama	
Rossassa Fel Qalb (Bullet in the Heart)	Mohammed Karim	Mohammed Abdel Wahab, Raqiya Ibrahim, Faten Hamama, Seraj Munir	Drama	
Berlanti (Berlanti)	Youssef Wahbi	Youssef Wahbi, Nour Al Hoda	Drama	
