= List of Egyptian films of 1986 =

A list of films produced in Egypt in 1986. For an A-Z list of films currently on Wikipedia, see Category:Egyptian films.

Title	Director	Cast	Genre	Notes
Al-Go'a (The Hunger)	Ali Badrakhan	Soad Hosny, Yousra	Drama	
Al Tawq Wal Esswera (The Collar and the Bracelet)	Khairy Beshara	Sherihan, Ezzat El Alayly	Drama	
Al-Onsa (The Female)	Hussein El-Wakil	Salah Zulfikar, Laila Elwi, Hussein Fahmy, Farouk Al-Fishawy	Drama	
Awdat mowatin (Return of a Citizen)	Mohamed Khan	Ahmed Abdelaziz, Mervat Amin, Yehia El-Fakharany	Drama	Screened at the 1987 Cannes Film Festival
Min Fadlik wa Ihsanik (Please, and Your Kindness)	Nagy Anglo	Salah Zulfikar, Huda Sultan, Hesham Selim	Drama	
Karakon Fe Al-Sharea (Karakon in the Street)	Ahmed Yehia	Adel Emam, Yousra	Comedy	
Salam Ya Sahby (Goodbye My Friend)	Nader Galal	Adel Emam, Saeed Saleh, Sawsan Badr	Action / crime	
