= List of Egyptian films of 1989 =

A list of films produced in Egypt in 1989. For an A-Z list of films currently on Wikipedia, see Category:Egyptian films.

Title	Director	Cast	Genre	Notes
Sha’et El Ostath Aliwa (Mr. Aliwa’s Apartment)	Saeed Abdallah	Salah Zulfikar, Laila Taher	Drama	
Al-Mouled (The Festival)	Samir Seif	Adel Emam, Yousra, Eman, Amina Rizk	Drama / thriller	
Kheyana (Betrayal)	Sherief Hamouda	Salah Zulfikar, Samir Sabry	Thriller	
El-Aragoz (The Puppeteer)	Hany Lashin	Omar Sharif, Mervat Amin	Drama	
