= Abi foq al-Shagara =

1969 Egyptian drama romantic film

Abi foq al-Shagara أبي فوق الشجرة
- Directed by: Hussein Kamal
- Written by: Ihsan Abdel Quddous
- Produced by: Abdel Halim Hafez
- Starring: Abdel Halim Hafez; Nadia Lutfi; Mervat Amin; Jenita Furneau; Samir Sabri; Salah Nazmi
- Cinematography: Wahid Farid
- Edited by: Rashida Abdel Salam Richard Best Bert Rule
- Music by: Ali Ismail
- Distributed by: Sawt al-Fann
- Release date: 17 February 1969 (Egypt)
- Running time: 142 min.
- Country: Egypt
- Language: Arabic

Abi foq al-Shagara (My Father Up on the Tree), is a 1969 Egyptian drama musical romantic film directed by Hussein Kamal and produced by Abdel Halim Hafez for Sawt al-Fann. The film stars Abdel Halim Hafez and Nadia Lutfi in lead roles where as Mervat Amin, Jenita Furneau, Samir Sabri and Salah Nazmi made supportive roles.

The film has been shot in and around Alexandria, Egypt. The film became a blockbuster of that year particularly due to many kissing scenes. The film is considered one of the best films ever made in Egypt. It was the final film appearance by lead actor Abdel Halim Hafez before his death on March 30, 1977 due to liver failure as a complication from Schistosoma mansoni.

== Plot ==
A 23-year old university student studying engineering summers in Alexandria, he reconnects with his old friends, most importantly, his girlfriend. He finds that his girlfriend doesn't want anything to do with him unless they are with their friends, and so they break up. He goes to a cabaret with another group of friends, and meets a dancer, Fairouz. He lives with her until he realizes her shameful lifestyle

== Cast ==
- Abdel Halim Hafez as Adel
- Nadia Lutfi as Firdaus
- Mervat Amin as Amaal
- Samir Sabri as Ashraf
- Salah Nazmi as Khamis
- Amira as Ahlam
- Nabila El Sayed
- Imad Hamdi as Kamal
- Hamed Morsi as Abdel Mawjood
- Mahmoud Rashad
- Nahed Samir
