= List of Egyptian films of 1947 =

A list of films produced in Egypt in 1947. For an A-Z list of films currently on Wikipedia, see Category:Egyptian films.

| Title | Director | Cast | Genre | Notes |
|---|---|---|---|---|
| Fatma | Ahmed Badrakhan | Umm Kulthum, Anwar Wagdi | Musical, Drama | |
| Abu Zayd al-Hilali | Ezzel Dine Zulficar | Seraj Munir, Faten Hamama | Biography | |
| Habib el Omr (Love of My Life) | | Samia Gamal, Farid al-Atrache, Ismail Yasseen | Drama | |
| Nour Minel Samaa (Light from Heaven) | Hassan Hilmy | Faten Hamama, Mahmoud Ismail | Drama | |
