= List of Egyptian films of 1935 =

A list of films produced in Egypt in 1935. For an A-Z list of films currently on Wikipedia, see Category:Egyptian films.

Title	Director	Cast	Genre	Notes
Al-Dahaya (The Victims)	Ibrahim Lama, Bahiga Hafez	Bahiga Hafez, Zaki Rostom		Talkie version of the 1932 film
Shajarat Al-Durr (Shajarat Al-Durr)	Ahmed Galal	Assia Dagher, Abdel Rahman Rouchdi		
Al-Difa (The Defense)	Youssef Wahbi	Youssef Wahbi, Amina Rizk		
Al-Doktor Farhat (Doctor Farhat)	Togo Mizrahi	Fawzi al-Gazaerli, Ehsane al-Gazaerli, Amina Mohamed		
Shalom al-Tourgman (Shalom the Interpreter)	Togo Mizrahi	Shalom, Abdou Meharram		
Bawwab Al-'imarah (The Concierge)	Alexandre Farkache	Ali al-Kassar, Fatheyya Mahmoud		
Al-Bahhar (The Sailor)	Togo Mizrahi	Ahmed al-Machriqi, Fawzi al-Gazaerli, Amina Mohamed		
Al-Ghandourah (The Female Dandy)	Mario Volpi	Mounira al-Mahdiyya, Ahmed Allam		
Ma'rouf Al-Badawi (Ma'rouf the Bedouin)	Ibrahim Lama	Badr Lama, Nabawiyya Mostafa		
Antar Afandi (Mr. Antar)	Stéphane Rosti	Stéphane Rosti, Samira Khouloussi		
Al-Mou'allim Bahbah (Bahbah the Teacher)	Choukri Madi	Fawzi al-Gazaerli, Ehsane al-Gazaerli		
Doumou' Al-Hobb; The (Tears of Love)	Mohammed Karim	Mohammed Abdel Wahab, Nagat Ali		
