= Zaynab (novel) =

1913 novel by Muhammad Husayn Haykal

Zaynab (زينب)
- Author: Muhammad Husayn Haykal
- Language: Egyptian Arabic (dialog) and Literary Arabic
- Genre: Novel
- Publisher: Haykal
- Publication date: 1913
- Publication place: Egypt
- Media type: Print (hardback)

Muhammad Husayn Haykal's novel Zaynab (Arabic: زينب Egyptian Arabic pronunciation: [ˈzeːnæb]), published in 1913, is often considered to be the "first" Arabic novel. The full title is Zaynab: Country Scenes and Morals (Arabic: زينب: مناظر واخلاق ريفية, romanized: Zaynab: Manazir wa'akhlaq rifiyyah). The book depicts life in the Egyptian countryside and delves into the traditional romantic and marital relationships between men and women and the interactions between the laboring cotton worker and plantation owner classes.

Haykal, son of rural land owners himself, had spent considerable time in France, where he was studying to be a lawyer, and it was actually at this point that he wrote Zaynab in 1911. Notably in the first publication, the author chose the pseudonym Masri Fallah ("An Egyptian Peasant"), which perhaps underlines the lack of prestige attached to the genre at the time of his writing.

== Plot introduction ==
Originally intended to be a short story, Haykal found that his work had more mileage than he had first appreciated, becoming a full novel in three parts. The story deals with a beautiful young peasant girl named Zaynab and the three men who strive for her affections: Hamid, the plantation owner's oldest son; Ibrahim, the young peasant foreman with whom she falls in love; and Hassan, a slightly more well-to-do peasant who enters into an unhappy arranged marriage with her. An early liberal critique of arranged marriage, the veil and enforced seclusion of women, the novel ends tragically with the heroine's psychological deterioration and death by "consumption."

== Literary significance & criticism ==
Despite the structural flaws of the novel (its unrestricted romanticism, its poor division of the focus on Zaynab and Hamid, and a letter by Hamid which is unashamedly Haykal's own recapitulation of all the events that have transpired thus far), the novel is hugely important as the beginning point of the era of the modern Egyptian novel, infused with vernacular language, local characters, and a liberal politico-social dimension.

== Film, TV, or theatrical adaptations ==
The novel became the basis for an Egyptian silent film, Zaynab, which was produced in 1930.
