= List of Egyptian films of 1943 =

A list of films produced in Egypt in 1943. For an A-Z list of films currently on Wikipedia, see Category:Egyptian films.

Title	Director	Cast	Genre	Notes
Nour El Dine We El Bahara				
