= List of Egyptian films of 1941 =

A list of films produced in Egypt in 1941. For an A-Z list of films currently on Wikipedia, see Category:Egyptian films.

Title	Director	Cast	Genre	Notes
Si Omar (Mr. Omar)		Naguib El Rihani	Comedy	
