= List of Egyptian films of 1992 =

A list of films produced in Egypt in 1992. For an A-Z list of films currently on Wikipedia, see Category:Egyptian films.

Title	Director	Cast	Genre	Notes
Al-Irhab Wal Kabab (Terrorism and Kebab)	Sherif Arafa	Adel Emam, Yousra, Kamal el-Shennawi	Political Comedy	
The Accused (El-Mottahama)	Henry Barakat	Salah Zulfikar, Ma'ali Zayed	Crime	
