= List of Egyptian films of 1996 =

A list of films produced in Egypt in 1996. For an A-Z list of films currently on Wikipedia, see Category:Egyptian films.

Title	Director	Cast	Genre	Notes
Al-Nom Fil-Assal (Sleeping in Honey)	Sherif Arafa	Adel Emam, Shereen Seif El-Nasr, Dalal Abdel Aziz	Drama / Comedy	
Istakoza (Lobsters)	Inas El-Degheidy	Ahmad Zaki	Drama	
Nasser 56	Mohamed Fadel	Ahmad Zaki	Biographical, Drama, Historical	
