= List of Egyptian films of 1940 =

A list of films produced in Egypt in 1940. For an A-Z list of films currently on Wikipedia, see Category:Egyptian films.

Title	Director	Cast	Genre	Notes
Yawm Said (Happy Day)	Mohammed Karim	Mohamed Abd El Wahab, Faten Hamama	Drama	
Dananeer	Ahmed Badrakhan	Oum Kalthoum, Suleiman Naguib, Abbas Fares, Fardous Hassan	Musical	
