= List of Egyptian films of 1946 =

A list of films produced in Egypt in 1946. For an A-Z list of films currently on Wikipedia, see Category:Egyptian films.

Title	Director	Cast	Genre	Notes
Dunia	Mohammed Karim	Raqiya Ibrahim, Faten Hamama	Drama	Entered into the 1946 Cannes Film Festival
Malak al-Rahma (The Angel of Mercy)	Youssef Wahbi	Faten Hamama, Farid Shawki, Youssef Wahbi	Drama	
