= List of Egyptian films of 1995 =

A list of films produced in Egypt in 1995. For an A-Z list of films currently on Wikipedia, see Category:Egyptian films.

Title	Director	Cast	Genre	Notes
Bakhit Wa Adeela (Bakhit and Adeela)	Nader Galal	Adel Emam, Sherine, Mustafa Metwalli	Comedy	
Night Terrors	Tobe Hooper	Robert Englund, Zoe Trilling, Alona Kimhi, Juliano Mer-Khamis	Horror	
Toyour El Zalam (Birds Of Darkness)	Sherif Arafa	Adel Emam, Yousra, Ryad El Khouly	Political / Drama	
