= List of Egyptian films of 1997 =

A list of films produced in Egypt in 1997. For an A-Z list of films currently on Wikipedia, see Category:Egyptian films.

Title	Director	Cast	Genre	Notes
Al Massir (The Destiny)	Youssef Chahine	Nour El-Sherif, Laila Elwi	Historical Drama	Screened at the 1997 Cannes Film Festival
Bakhit Wa Adeela 2 (Bakhit and Adeela 2)	Nader Galal	Adel Emam, Sherine, Saeed Saleh	Comedy	
