= List of Egyptian films of 1998 =

A list of films produced in Egypt in 1998. For an A-Z list of films currently on Wikipedia, see Category:Egyptian films.

Title	Director	Cast	Genre	Notes
Edhak El Soura Tetlaa Helwa (Smile, the Photo will be Nice)	Sherif Arafa	Ahmad Zaki	Social Drama	
Resala Ela Alwaly (A Message to the Governor)	Nader Galal	Adel Emam, Yousra, Mustafa Metwalli	Comedy	
