= List of Egyptian films of 1980 =

A list of films produced in Egypt in 1980. For an A-Z list of films currently on Wikipedia, see Category:Egyptian films.

Title	Director	Cast	Genre	Notes
Al Sharida				
Al Raghba				
Azkiya' laken aghbiya' (Trouble Seeker)	Niazi Mostafa	Rushdy Abaza, Adel Emam, Samir Ghanem, Madiha Kamel, Yousra	Comedy	
Daerat al shak				
El-Gaheem (The Hell)	Mohamed Rady	Adel Emam, Madiha Kamel, Salah Nazmi, Sherine	Crime / drama	
Ghawi Mashakel (Trouble Seeker)	Mohamed Abdel Aziz	Adel Emam, Noura	Comedy / drama	
Ragol Faqad Aqloh (A Man Lost His Mind)	Mohamed Abdel Aziz	Adel Emam, Farid Shawki, Soheir Ramzy, Ekramy, Karima Mokhtar	Comedy / drama	
Shaaban Taht El-Sifr (Shaaban Under Zero)	Henry Barakat	Adel Emam, Essad Younis, Gamil Ratib Emad Hamdy, Eman	Comedy / crime	
