= List of Egyptian films of 1942 =

This is a list of films produced in Egypt in 1942.

Title	Director	Cast
Ibn El-balad (The Urchin)	Stephan Rosti	Mahmoud Zulfikar, Aziza Amir
Mammnou'a El Hob (Love is Not Allowed)		Mohammed Abdel Wahab
Aydah (Aida)	Ahmed Badrakhan	Umm Kulthum, Suleiman Naguib, Abbas Fares
