= List of Egyptian films of 1999 =

A list of films produced in Egypt in 1999. For an A-Z list of films currently on Wikipedia, see Category:Egyptian films.

Title	Director	Cast	Genre	Notes
Ard El Khof (Land of Fear)	Daoud Abdel Sayed	Ahmad Zaki, Hamdi Gaith, Abdulrahman Abu Zahra, Zeina	Crime / Thriller	
El Akhar (The Other)	Youssef Chahine	Nabila Ebeid, Mahmoud Hemida, Hanan Tork, Hani Salama	Drama	Screened at the 1999 Cannes Film Festival
El Madina (The City)	Yousry Nasrallah	Bassem Samra	Drama	
Elwad Mahrous Betaa Alwazir (Mahroos; The Minister's Guy)	Nader Galal	Adel Emam, Kamal el-Shennawi, Wafaa Amer	Comedy	
El Embratora (The Empress)		Maurice Moussally		
