= List of Egyptian films of 1993 =

A list of films produced in Egypt in 1993. For an A-Z list of films currently on Wikipedia, see Category:Egyptian films.

Title	Director	Cast	Genre	Notes
El Mansy (The Forgotten)	Sherif Arafa	Adel Emam, Yousra, Karam Mutawi	Drama / Comedy	
Wazeer fel Gebs (Minister in Plaster)	Karim Diaa El-Dine	Salah Zulfikar	Drama / Comedy	
Mr. Karate (Mister Karate)	Mohamed Khan	Ahmad Zaki	Action	
Sawwaq El Hanem (The Lady's Driver)	Hassan Ibrahim	Ahmad Zaki	Drama	
