= List of Egyptian films of 1945 =

A list of films produced in Egypt in 1945. For an A-Z list of films currently on Wikipedia, see Category:Egyptian films.

| Title | Director | Cast | Genre | Notes |
|---|---|---|---|---|
| Sallama | Togo Mizrahi | Om Kalthoum | | |
