= List of Egyptian films of 1931 =

A list of films produced in Egypt in 1931. For an A-Z list of films currently on Wikipedia, see Category:Egyptian films.

Title	Director	Cast	Genre	Notes
Sahib Al-Sa'adah Kechkech Bey (His Excellency Kechkech Bey)	Naguib el-Rihani, Stéphane Rosti	Naguib el-Rihani, Stéphane Rosti		
Wakhz Al-Damir (Pangs of Remorse)	Ibrahim Lama	Assia Dagher, Mary Queeny		
