= Serag Munir =

Egyptian actor (1901–1957)

- Born: July 7, 1904; Cairo, Egypt
- Died: 1957 (aged 52–53); Cairo, Egypt
- Occupation: Actor
- Years active: 1930-1957

Serag Munir (1901–1957) was an Egyptian film actor. He appeared in 46 films between 1930 and 1957.

== Selected filmography ==
- The Leech (1956)
- Al-Malak al-Zalem (1954)
- Wafaa (1953)
- Lahn al-Kholood (1952)
- Amina (1951)
- Kursi al-I`tiraf (1949)
- The Adventures of Antar and Abla (1948)
- Abu Zayd al-Hilali (1947)
- Rossassa Fel Qalb (1944)
- Red Orchids (1938)
- Napoleon Is to Blame for Everything (1938)
- Sons of Aristocrats (1932)
- Zaynab (1930)
