= Amina Mohamed (film director) =

Egyptian dancer

- Born: 1908
- Died: 1985 (aged 76–77)
- Citizenship: Egypt
- Occupations: Dancer, actress and film director
- Notable work: Tita Wong, 1937

Amina Mohamed (1908–1985) was an Egyptian dancer, actress and film director.

== Life ==
Mohamed was from a poor rural background without links to the Cairo art scene. She and her niece, Amina Rizq, moved to Cairo with their mothers; the pair were locked in the house after their first theatrical performance. Amina succeeded in gaining fame as a dancer and actress.

Mohamed was director, producer, screenwriter, editor and star of Tita Wong (1937). The film was shot in collaboration with a group of intellectual friends, including the director Salah Abou Seif and the painters Salah Taher and Abdel Salam El Sherif. Tita Wong, played by Mohamed, is the daughter of poor Chinese immigrants in Cairo, forced to dance in a night club. Accused of murdering her uncle, her lawyer tries to argue her innocence, with flashbacks illustrating her earlier life.

== Film ==
=== As director ===
- Tita Wong, 1937

=== As actress ===
- Dr. Farhat, 1935
- The Sailor / El bahar (1935)
- Shadow of the Past / Shabah el madi (1935)
- The Night Watchman / Ghafir el darak (1936)
- The Doorkeeper / Bawwab el imarah (1936)
- One Hundred Thousand Guineas / Meet alf guinea (1936)
- Tita Wong (1937)
- Eternal Glory / El magid el khalid (1937)
- The Love of the Mad / El hub el morestani (1937)
- The Ten Commandments (1956) - Architect's Assistant #2
