= Mervat Amin =

Egyptian actress (born 1948)

- ميرفت أمين
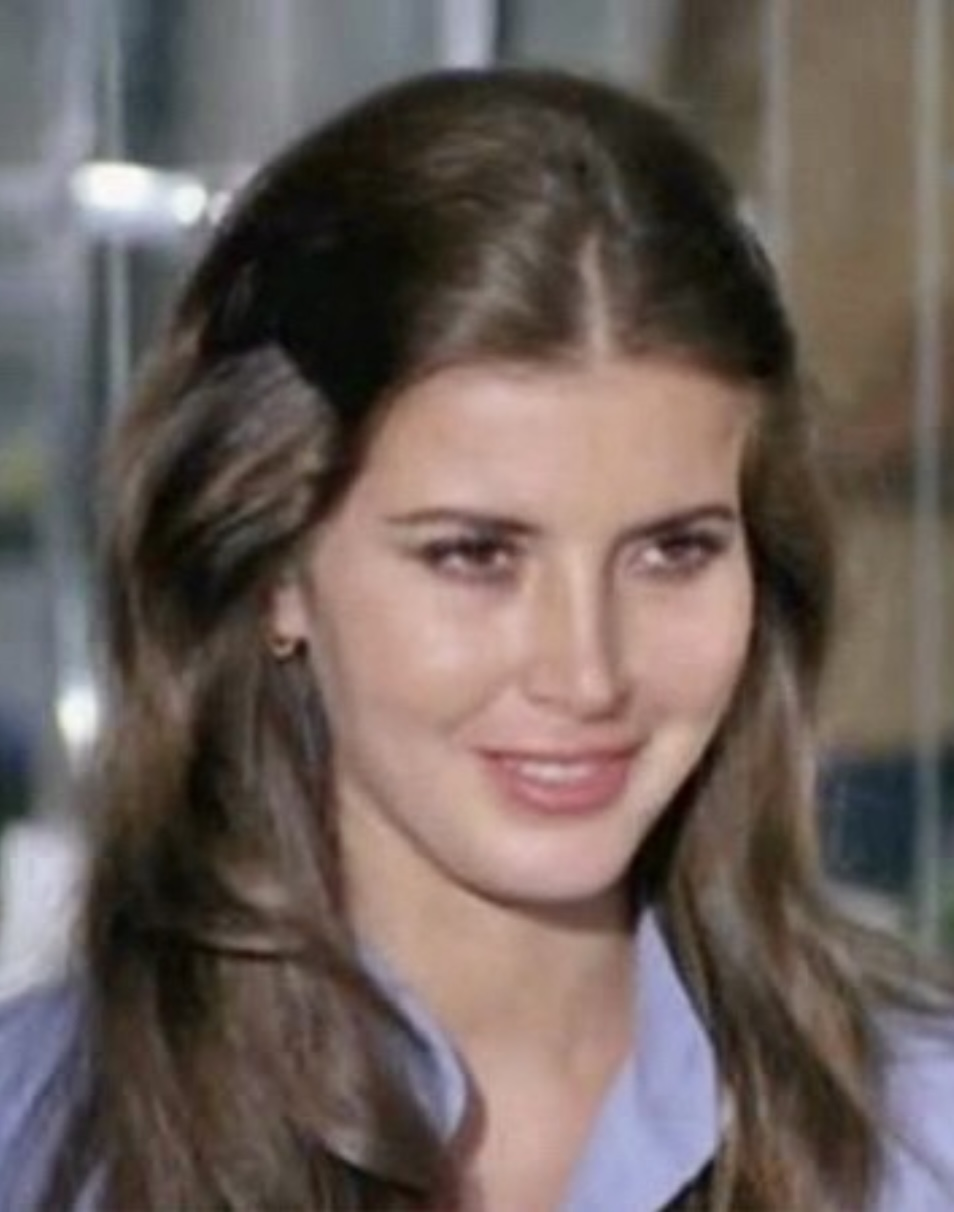
- Mervat Amin, 1980
- Born: Mervat Mostafa Amin ميرفت مصطفى امين; November 24, 1948 (age 77); Minya, Egypt
- Citizenship: Egyptian
- Education: Ain Shams University
- Occupations: Actress, voice actress
- Years active: 1968–present
- Spouses: Moafak Bahgat (m. 1970; div. 1971) Omar Khorshid (m. 1972; div. 1973) Hussein Fahmy (m. 1974; div. 1986) Hussain Al Qolla (divorced) Mustafa El Beleedy (m. 1986; div. 1989)
- Children: 1
- Relatives: Abdel Moneim Amin (uncle)

Mervat Mostafa Amin (Arabic: ميرفت مصطفى أمين; born November 24, 1948) is an Egyptian actress.

== Early life ==
She was born in El Minya to Mohammed Mostafa Amin, a doctor from Upper Egypt and a Scottish mother, the headmistress of the Primary Section of the English School in Cairo. She was raised in Heliopolis and has a bachelor's degree in English Literature from Ain Shams University. Mervat Amin's uncle is Egyptian military figure Abdel Moneim Amin, who was a member of the Free Officers Movement, and the Ambassador of Egypt to West Germany.

== Career ==
Amin's film debut in Egyptian cinema was in Nfus Ha'irah (1968) with Ahmed Mazhar (1917-2002), followed by her role with Salah Zulfikar (1926-1993) in Thalath Nesaa (1968) and her fame came when she took her first leading role, with Abdel Halim Hafez (1929-1977) in his last film, Abi Foq El Shagara (1969).

Mervat Amin and Abdel Halim Hafez in Abi Foq El Shagara (1969)

From there she became one of the most successful Egyptian actresses in the 1970s and 1980s during which she starred in many Egyptian films. Amin's notable films include; The Return of the Most Dangerous Man in the World (1972), Searching for a Scandal (1973), Sons of Silence (1974), Circle of Revenge (1976), Barefoot on the Golden Bridge (1976), And the Devil is Their Third Accomplice (1978), I Want Love and Tenderness (1978), The Bus Driver (1982), Tit for Tat (1984), Falsification of Legal Documents (1984), Return of a Citizen (1986), The Wife of an Important Man (1988), The Puppeteer (1989), The Days of Sadat (2001), and 30 Years Ago (2016).

== Personal life ==
Mervat Amin has been married five times. Notably, she was briefly married to Egyptian guitarist Omar Khorshid, then to the renowned Egyptian actor Hussein Fahmy from 1974 to 1986 when the marriage ended in divorce. They have one daughter, Menna.

== Filmography ==
=== Film ===
Year	Title	Arabic Title
1968	Confused Souls	Nfus Ha'irah نفوس حائرة
1968	Three Women	3 Nesa 3 نساء
1968	The Lawsuit	El Adiyya القضية
1969	My Father Up the Tree	Abi Foq El Shagarah أبي فوق الشجرة
1970	The Hardest Marriage	Asab Gawaz أصعب جواز
1970	Escapers from Love	Harebat men El Hobb هاربات من الحب
1970	The Pickpocket	Sareq El Mahfazah سارق المحفظة
1971	Chitchat on the Nile	Thartharah Foq El Nil, ثرثرة فوق النيل
1971	Forgiveness	El Ghofran الغفران
1971	Beauty and the Thief	El Hasna W El less الحسناء واللص
1971	Lion of Night	Sab' El Lil سبع الليل
1972	A Nose and Three Eyes	Anf Wa Thalath 'Oyun, أنف وثلاث عيون
1972	Housing Crisis	Azmet Sakan أزمة سكن
1972	A Call for Life	Da’awal Lel Hayah دعوة للحياة
1972	The Greatest Kid in the World	Azam Tefl Fi El Alam أعظم طفل في العالم
1972	The Return of the Most Dangerous Man in the World	'Awdet Akhtar Ragol Fi Al Alam عودة أخطر رجل في العالم
1973	The Sugar Bowl (El Sokkariyyah) District	El Sokkariyyah السكرية
1973	The Back Stairs	El Sellem El Khalfi السلم الخلفي
1973	The Girls and the Mercedes	El Banat W El Marsides البنات و المرسيدس
1973	Gang of Teenagers	Shellet El Moraheqin شلة المراهقين
1973	Searching for a Scandal	El Bahth 'an Fedihah البحث عن فضيحة
1973	The School for Troublemakers	Madraset El Moshaghebin مدرسة المشاغبين
1974	Sons of Silence	Abna' El Samt أبناء الصمت
1974	The Grandson	El Hafid الحفيد
1974	The Beauty and the Scoundrel	El Fatenah W El So'luk الفاتنة والصعلوك
1974	Melody in My Life	Nagham Fi Hayati نغم فى حياتى
1974	The Wonders of Time	'Agayeb ya Zaman عجايب يا زمن
1974	The Clock is Striking Ten	Al Sa'a Tadoqq El Asherah الساعة تدق العاشرة
1974	The Innocent	El Abriya الأبرياء
1975	The Liar	El Kaddab الكداب
1975	The Madness of Youth	Genun El Shabab جنون الشباب
1975	Don't Leave Me Alone	La Tatrokni Wahdi لا تتركني وحدي
1975	A Meeting with the Past	Leqa' Ma'a El Madi لقاء مع الماضي
1975	The Female And the Wolves	El Ontha W El Zeab الانثى و الذئاب
1975	Love in the Rain	El Hobb Tahat El Matar الحب تحت المطر
1975	Then Love Ended	W Entaha El Hobb وانتهى الحب
1976	I Wish I'd Never Known Love	Laytani Ma 'Arafet Al Hobb ليتني ما عرفت الحب
1976	The Good Kids	El Eyal El Tayyibin العيال الطيبين
1976	The Hot Tears	El Dumu El Sakhenah الدموع الساخنة
1976	Barefoot on the Golden Bridge	Hafiyah 'Ala Gesr El Zahab حافية على جسر الذهب
1976	Heartbeat	Daqqet Qalb دقة قلب
1976	Circle of Revenge	Da'erat Al Enteqam دائرة الانتقام
1977	A Place for Love = The Sins of Love	Makan Lel Hobb= Khataya El Hobb مكان للحب = خطايا الحب
1977	Love Before Bread, Sometimes	El Hobb Qabl El Khobz Ahyanan الحب قبل الخبز أحيانًا
1978	Some Get Married Twice	El Ba'd Yazhab Lel Ma'zun Marretin البعض يذهب للمأذون مرتين
1978	The Other Woman	El Mar'ah El Okhra المرأة الأخرى
1978	A Call After Midnight	Mukalma Ba'd Montasaf El Lil مكالمة بعد منتصف الليل
1978	Masters and Slaves	Asyad W 'Abid أسياد وعبيد
1978	And the Devil is Their Third Accomplice	Wa Thalethhom El Shitan وثالثهم الشيطان
1978	A Forest of Legs	Ghabah Men El Siqan غابة من السيقان
1978	The Path of Lovers	Sekket El Asheqin سكة العاشقين
1978	An Unforgettable Night	Lilah La Tonsa ليلة لا تنسى
1978	I Want Love and Tenderness	Orid Hobban Wa Hananan, أريد حبا و حنانا
1979	Save This Family	Enqezu Hazehi El Aelah أنقذوا هذه العائلة
1979	Don't Weep, My Love	La Tabki Ya Habib Al Omr لا تبكي ياحبيب العمر
1979	Premeditated	Ma'a Sabq El Esrar مع سبق الإصرار
1980	Sorry, I Refuse Divorce	Asfah Arfod El Talaq آسفة أرفض الطلاق
1980	Love Alone is not Enough	El Hobb Wahdoh La Yakfi الحب وحده لا يكفي
1982	The Bus Driver	Sawwaq El Utubis سواق الأتوبيس
1984	Tit For Tat	Wahda Be Wahdah واحدة بواحدة
1984	Falsification of Legal Documents	Tazwir fi Awraq Rasmeya تزوير في أوراق رسمية
1985	Fingerprints on Water	Basamat Foq El Ma' بصمات فوق الماء
1985	Save What Can Be Saved	Enqaz Ma Yomken Enqazoh إنقاذ ما يمكن إنقاذه
1986	Return of a Citizen	'Awdet Muwaten عودة مواطن
1986	The Train	El Qetar القطار
1986	The Taxi Fare	El Bondera البنديره
1986	The Thugs	El Awbash الأوباش
1987	Two Women and a Man	Emra'atan W Ragol امرأتان و رجل
1988	The Wife of an Important Man	Zawget Ragol Mohemm زوجة رجل مهم
1988	Days of Terror	Ayyam El ro'b أيام الرعب
1988	A Night in the Seventh Month	Lilah Fi Shahr sabaah ليله فى شهر سبعة
1988	Youth in Hell	Shabab Fi El Gahim شباب في الجحيم
1988	The Claws of a Woman	Makhaleb Emra'ah مخالب امرأة
1989	The World on a Dove's Wing	El Donya 'Ala Genah Yamamah الدنيا على جناح يمامة
1989	The Puppeteer	El Araguz الأراجوز
1991	The Return and the Bird	El 'Awda W El Asfur العوده والعصفور
1992	The Whispers of Female Slaves	Hams El Gawari همس الجواري
1993	Little Dreams	Ahlam Saghirah أحلام صغيرة
1993	Why, Pyramid?	Leh ya Haram? ليه يا هرم؟
1994	Red Card	Kart Ahmar كارت أحمر
1998	The Pleasurable Killing	El Qatl El Laziz القتل اللذيذ
1999	The Wedding	El Farah الفرح
2000	Fate of a Woman	Qadar Emraah قدر إمرأة
2001	First Secondary	Ola Thanawi أولى ثانوي
2001	The Days of Sadat	Ayam El-Sadat أيام السادات
2007	Morgan Ahmed Morgan	Morgan Ahmed Morgan مرجان أحمد مرجان
2014	My Mother-in-Law Loves Me	Hamati Bethebbeni حماتي بتحبني
2015	According to Cairo Time	Be Tawqit Elqaherah بتوقيت القاهرة
2016	30 Years Ago	Men 30 Sanah من 30 سنة
2017	No Trespassing or Photography Allowed	Mamnu' El Eqterab Aw El Taswir ممنوع الاقتراب أو التصوير

=== Television ===
Year	Title	Arabic Title
1999	The Other Man	El Ragol El Akher الرجل الآخر
2006	Maryam's Sorrows	Ahzan Maryam أحزان مربم
2013	School of Dreams	Madraset El Ahlam مدرسة الأحلام
2016	Ghoul's Head	Ras El Ghoul راس الغول
2017	Don't Extinguish the Sun	La Totfi El Shams لا تطفئ الشمس
