= Furigat =

- فرجت
- Directed by: Hussein Fawzi
- Written by: Abo El Seoud El Ebiary (story, screenplay, and dialogue); Hussein Fawzi (screenplay and dialogue)
- Produced by: Ramses Naguib
- Starring: Naima Akef; Abbas Fares; Hassan Fayek; Fouad Shafiq; Mohsen Sarhan; Abdel Salam Al Nabulsy; Zomoroda
- Cinematography: François Farkash; Helmi Farid
- Edited by: Amira Fayed; Attia Abdo
- Music by: Farid Ghosn
- Production company: Nahas Films
- Release date: July 2, 1951
- Running time: 125 minutes
- Country: Egypt
- Language: Arabic

Furigat (Arabic: فرجت, translated as All's Well) is an Egyptian film released on July 2, 1951. The film is directed by Hussein Fawzi, features a screenplay by Abo El Seoud El Ebiary, and stars Naima Akef, Mohsen Sarhan, Abbas Fares, and Hassan Fayek. The plot revolves around a belly dancer named Sett al-Kul who dreams of fame and money fronting a traveling music group. She sees her opportunity when her father returns a wealthy woman's lost purse, whereupon she offers to perform in the grandee's band.

== Synopsis ==
The musicians of the Ataba and Zamar neighborhoods of Cairo are down on their luck and squatting in a coffee shop without regular gigs. Qanun player Abu al-Khair (Abu al-Khair), currently unemployed like the rest, leads an informal troupe while his daughter Sett al-Kul (Naima Akef sings and dances in a cabaret together with their neighbor Karawan (Hassan Fayek) and his daughter Sobia (Nawal Baghdadi). When the cabaret director tries to sell Sett al-Kul to a nouveau riche enriched by the 1948 Arab—Israeli War, she and Karawan refuse the dishonor and slap the patron, resulting in their expulsion to join the rest of the unemployed musicians.

Karawan suggests that Abu al-Khair come work for the latter's colleague, Maestro Bulbul (Abdel Salam Al Nabulsy), the talented leader of a large performing troupe holding forth at the Nefertiti Theater. Abu al-Khair agrees and tries to audition, but Bulbul does not remember him and has his guard Metwally (Mokhtar Hussein) kick Abu al-Khair out of the Nefertiti. Outside the theater, Abu al-Khair finds a purse with a significant amount of money in it and no owner in sight. Upon his return home, he finds the landlady, Umm Gemmayze (Widad Hamdi), threatening him with eviction, so he opens the purse to pay some rent. She returns the purse to him, upon which he asks for help getting Bulbul to hire the local musicians. When neighborhood star Nour el-Ayoun Hanim (Samia Roshdi) travels to Lebanon, however, all hope appears lost.

Sett al-Kul meets the wealthy Adnan Bey (Fouad Shafiq), patron of Bulbul's band, and asks for help. Since he wants to stymie his mistress, the star singer Nargis (Zomoroda), from blackmailing him for £E5,000 to avoid revealing his love letters she kept, Adnan Bey agrees to hire Sett al-Kul. She joins the band, learns of and confiscates the love letters, and is established as the patron's new mistress to the chagrin of the defeated Nargis. Nargis meets Adnan Bey's son Hosni (Mohsen Sarhan), with whom she falls in love. Sett al-Kul delivers the letters to Adnan Bey, and they agree to merge the neighborhood musicians with Bulbul's Nefertiti band. Sett al-Kul is evicted by Umm Gemmayze, but Karawan and Sobia hire a cabbie named Tosca (Mohammed El-Bakkar) to kidnap Adnan Bey and Nargis and bring them in to tell the truth about their situation. Hosni, enamored with Sett al-Kul's virtue, marries her, and the Bulbul troupe performs happily ever after.

== Cast ==
- Naima Akef (Sett al-Kul bint Abu al-Khair)
- Mohsen Sarhan (Hussein Adnan)
- Abbas Fares (Abu al-Khair, Sett al-Kul's father and qanun player)
- Fouad Shafiq (Adnan Bey, rich financier of Bulbul's band)
- Hassan Fayek (Karawan, Sett al-Kul's neighbor)
- Mokhtar Hussein (Metwally, theatre guard)
- Abdel Salam Al Nabulsy (Bulbul, bandleader who shares the name of a melodious songbird)
- Widad Hamdi (Umm Gemmayza, matron who loses the purse)
- Hassan Atleh (director of the Nefertiti Theater)
- Abdel Moneim Ismail (Min Yaerif, owner of the cabaret where Sett al-Kul starts off performing)
- Mohammed El-Bakkar (Tosca, taxi driver)
- Mounir al-Fangari (barista)
- Samia Roshdi (Nour el-Ayoun Hanim)
- Zomoroda (Adnan Bey's mistress)
- Abdelhalim al-Qalawi (war profiteer)
- Abdulnabi Muhammad (Mahdar)

=== Supporting cast ===
- Fikriya Muhammad
- Abdelaziz Saeed
- Samia Mohsen
- Samira Mohammed
- Nawal Bahgdadi
- Zaki Mohammed Hassan
- Petro Tannous
- Toson Moatamed
- Mutawa Owais
- Aliya Fawzy
- Ahmed Abdelhalim (dancer)
- Mephisto Trio (dancer)
- Fatima Ali (vocals)
- Salah Abdelhamid (vocals)

== Production ==
Maher Zuhdi wrote in July 2015 in the Kuwaiti newspaper Al-Jarida that:

Naima Akef was traumatized by the death of Camelia…She blamed herself after attacking Camelia on the set of [1950 film] My Father Is a Groom…Hussein Fawzi confessed to having made her jealous on purpose to test her resilience to star in his next movie, Furigat.

The film is based on a German play found by actor Hussein Sedki, while the screenplay and song lyrics were from the pen of Abo El Seoud El Ebiary. Casting actors with whom Akef had worked before, Fawzi was able to situate the story in a more Egyptian context.

Fawzi had returned from vacation in Beirut to attend the premiere in Cairo alongside Akef and Mohsen Sarhan. Sarhan proposed to her afterwards, but she refused and married Fawzi, with whom she would divorce in 1958.

== Songs ==
Songs in score
Title	Lyricist	Composer	Singer
“الحب” (“Love”)	Abo El Seoud El Ebiary	Ezzat al-Jahili	Naima Akef
“فرجت” (“Furigat”)	Abo El Seoud El Ebiary	Ali Farraj	Naima Akef
“أنا رقاصة” (“I Am a Dancer”)	Abo El Seoud El Ebiary	Ezzat al-Jahili	Naima Akef
“ورد وياسمين” (“Roses and Jasmine”)	Abo El Seoud El Ebiary	Ahmed Sabra	Salah Abdelhamid
“كليوباترا” (“Cleopatra”)	Mustafa al-Sayyid	Ahmed Sabra	Naima Akef and Fatima Ali
“البحارة” (“Sailors”)	Mustafa al-Sayyid	Ezzat al-Jahili	Naima Akef

== Reception ==
Film critic Sami el-Salamouny wrote of Hussein Fawzi:

Hussein Fawzi was one of the few true specialists of musical cinema…He built the entire story around maximizing the number of song-and-dance numbers for Naima Akef…In 1951, he presented the ultimate showcase of this work with her in the movie Furigat.

Waseem Afifi wrote for the website تراثيات (“Heritage”) the article “زوج نعيمة عاكف الموهوب الذي لم ينال الشهرة” (“Naima Akef’s Talented Husband, Who Did Not Achieve Fame”):

Hussein Fawzi…one of the great directors who, despite their talent, did not find fame compared to his contemporaries…The year 1949 is considered a turning point in his life when he met actress Naima Akef, who was raised in her family’s circus since her birth in 1922...Fascinated by belly dance, she became the star of the KitKat Club in Cairo at the age of sixteen…Director Abbas Kamel, Fawzi’s brother, brought him to watch her perform, beginning an endless fascination of Fawzi’s with performing arts such as dancing, singing, acrobatics, acting, and the circus.

Afifi notes the director's work to bring Akef's potential to the silver screen as “a slum girl seeking to employ her family in the theatre in the movie Furigat.” Continuing to narrate the director and his star's artistic and personal relationship, he writes:

He presented her in 1957 in the role of an exotic Roma who falls in love with a wealthy young man in Tamr Henna, and in 1958 as a girl in the Al-Alam neighborhood on Mohammed Ali Street in I Love You, Hassan, the couple’s last collaboration before their divorce.

The magazine Al-Hilal wrote that the success of the duo of Mohsen Sarhan and Naima Akef earned them “the cover of [local film publication literally meaning “star”] Al-Kawakeb Magazine on July 1, 1951, for their work in Furigat.
