= Local & Sweet =

- بلدي وخفة
- Directed by: Hussein Fawzi
- Written by: Hassan Tawfik (story, scenario, and dialogue); Hussein Fawzi (scenario and dialogue)
- Produced by: Ramses Naguib
- Starring: Naima Akef; Saad Abdel Wahab; Mahmoud Shokoko; Abbas Fares; Lola Sedki; Stephan Rosti; Souad Ahmed
- Cinematography: François Farkash (primary cinematographer; Helmy Farid (secondary cinematographer
- Edited by: Raymond Korba (main editor); Attia Abdo (assistant editor)
- Music by: Abdulaziz Mohammed
- Production company: Nahas Films
- Release date: April 2, 1950
- Running time: 120 minutes
- Country: Egypt
- Language: Arabic

Local & Sweet (Arabic: بلدي وخفة, transliterated Balady wa khifat) is an Egyptian musical drama film released on April 2, 1950. The film is directed by Hussein Fawzi, features a screenplay co-written by Fawzi and Hassan Tawfiq, and stars Naima Akef and Saad Abdel Wahab. The heroine, Hanuma, tries to escape poverty by any means despite her engagement to the penniless Mahrous. Khaled enters their lives and helps Mahrous move ahead in his career, presumably easing the potential couple's progress, but Khaled falls in love with Hanuma.

== Cast ==
- Saad Abdel Wahab (Mahrous, singer)
- Naima Akef (Hanuma, fruit vendor)
- Mahmoud Shokoko (Mishmish, coffee vendor)
- Lola Sedki (Habayeb, singer)
- Zeinat Sedki (Hanuma's mother)
- Abbas Fares (Khaleb Bey, film producer; Habib Lula)
- Stephan Rosti (Satan)
- Souad Ahmed
- Mohammed Mazen al-Ansari
- Mahmoud al-Tuni
- Ahmed Abdel Halim
- Ahmed Amer
- Pedro Tannous
- Mephisto Trio

== Synopsis ==
Obscure singer-songwriter Mahrous (Saad Abdel Wahab) lives in the al-Hana al-Shifa neighborhood of Cairo, performing and selling fresh produce for a living in the café run by Umm Zaaabal (Souad Ahmed) and Mishmish (Mahmoud Shokoko). Mahrous and his girlfriend Hanuma (Naima Akef) agree to marry, and he tries to make ends meet by performing for one pound per gathering. Satan himself (Stephan Rosti) tries to separate the couple but is resisted by an angel (Mohammed Mazen al-Ansari).

At a party where he performs, Mahrous impresses a singer named Habayeb (Lola Sedki), who invites him to interview with the film studio run by her lover Khaled Bey (Abbas Fares). The director, Sherif (Mahmoud al-Tuni), likes his music and agrees with Khaled to produce a musical film vehicle starring Mahrous. Khaled Bey meets and tries to seduce Hanuma with an invitation to an upper-crust party, and when she refuses, Satan persuades her to go anyway to counter Mahrous's ostensible intention to cheat with Habayeb. Hanuma changes into upper-class outfits and sings and dances, angering Mahrous and Mishmish, who let Umm Zaabal and Hanuma's own mother (“Umm” Hanumah) in on Hanuma's putting on airs. Umm Hanuma beats her and Satan goads her to flee to Khaled Bey, who teaches the ingénue Hanuma all the secrets of dance, singing, dress, and drink. The angel apprises her of Khaled's sinister intentions and informs her of her mother's falling ill over her daughter's leaving as well as Mahrous's missing her, thus helping Hanuma escape.

Hanuma returns to work at the produce stand and to her mother's good graces, while Mahrous leaves a disappointed Khaled Bey, who calls her the most honorable and talented dancer he has ever known. Khaled considers her talented but marries Habayeb, who is turned down for the lead role in the operetta. Mahrous insists that Khaled cast Hanuma, so the impresario goes to al-Hana al-Shifa to convince Umm Hanuma and Umm Zaabal of the wisdom of Hanuma going into pictures. The musical film, in which Hanuma dances and sings to tunes written by Mahrous, is a hit, and the couple marries with the proceeds.

== Songs ==
Songs in score
Title	Lyricist	Composer	Singer
“يا سعادة البيه يا جنيه” (“Oh, Happiness of the House, Oh, Pound”)	Hassan Tawfik	Abdulaziz Mohammed-/Mohamed El Qasabgi/Ali Farraj/Mahmoud Shokoko	Saad Abdel Wahab in a sarcastic song in which he sings of money as the greatest treasure of the household in the manner of a woman
“الدنيا بترقص وتغنى” (“The World Is Dancing and Singing”)	Hassan Tawfik	Abdulaziz Mohammed/Mohamed El Qasabgi/Ali Farraj/Mahmoud Shokoko	Saad Abdel Wahab
“أنا استويت وبقيت” (“I Settled and Stayed”)	Hassan Tawfik	Abdulaziz Mohammed/Mohamed El Qasabgi/Ali Farraj/Mahmoud Shokoko	Naima Akef
“الأوله آه والتانيه آه” (“The First, Ah, the Second, Ah”)	Hassan Tawfik	Abdulaziz Mohammed/Mohamed El Qasabgi/Ali Farraj/Mahmoud Shokoko	Naima Akef and Mahmoud Shokoko
“أنا في سوق الهوى رسمال” (“I Am in the Zouk of the Fancy Capital”)	Hassan Tawfik	Abdulaziz Mohammed/Mohamed El Qasabgi/Ali Farraj/Mahmoud Shokoko	Saad Abdel Wahab
“آه يا لامونى يا لامونى، وفى حبك يا واد ظلمونى” (“Oh, Jealousy, Jealousy, My Love for the Depths, They Wronged Me”)	Hassan Tawfik	Abdulaziz Mohammed/Mohamed El Qasabgi/Ali Farraj/Mahmoud Shokoko	Naima Akef

In one scene, Saad Abdel Wahab raises the adhan (call to prayer), noted in the e-zine Masrawy as asking the question:

Is working in the arts haram? Or so asked the late Saad Abdel Wahab in his fourth film, Local & Sweet, released in 1950, where he was the first actor in Egypt to raise the adhan on film.
