= Delight of My Eyes =

- نور عيوني
- Directed by: Hussein Fawzi
- Written by: Zoheir Bakir (story, script, and dialogue); Hussein Fawzi (script and dialogue); Abdullah Ahmed Abdullah (dialogue)
- Produced by: Zoheir Bakir
- Starring: Naima Akef; Karem Mahmoud; Hassan Fayek; Mahmoud el-Meliguy; Zeinat Sedki
- Cinematography: Adel Abdelazim (cinematographer); Ahmed Attia (assistant cinematographer); Mohamed Abdelazim (director of photography); Taha Ramadan (photographer)
- Edited by: Said el-Sheikh (editor); Hussein Afifi (editor); Jamil Abdelaziz (film synthesizer); Nemat Fayed (negative)
- Music by: Karem Mahmoud; Ezzat al-Jahili; Ibrahim Hussein; Brahim Haggiag; Aziz El-Shawan
- Production company: Umayya Films
- Distributed by: Ali Rida
- Release date: 19 April 1954
- Running time: 120 minutes
- Country: Egypt
- Language: Arabic

Delight of My Eyes (Arabic: نور عيوني, transliterated as Nour e'youni) is an Egyptian film released on 19 April 1954. The musical drama film is directed by Hussein Fawzi, features a screenplay by Zoheir Bakir, and stars Naima Akef, Karem Mahmoud, Hassan Fayek, and Mahmoud el-Meliguy. The plot involves theatre owner Hanafi's efforts to woo his dancer star Nour el-Ayoun, which degenerate into efforts to stymie her relationship with her neighbor Adel.

== Cast ==
- Naima Akef (Noor el-Ayoun)
- Karem Mahmoud (Adel)
- Hassan Fayek (Hamouda, Noor el-Ayoun's father)
- Zeinat Sedki (Sharbat, Noor el-Ayoun's mother)
- Mahmoud el-Meliguy (Hanafi, the theatre owner)
- Mona Fouad (Samira, a singer at the theatre)
- Ezzat al-Jahili (Ali, a composer)
- Mounir al-Fangari (Fahlawi, a composer)
- Abdel Moneim Bassiouni (police detective)
- Mohamed Shawky
- Mohsen Hassanein
- Fathi al-Safoury
- Mohamed Sobeih
- Abbas al-Dali
- Zaki Mohammed Hassan
- Samir Jumaa
- Adib Trabelsi
- Abdel Moneim Seoudi
- Fifi Saeed
- Suhair Abdo

== Synopsis ==
Hamouda (Hassan Fayek) sings to guests when his wife Sharbat (Zeinat Sedki) screams that she is going into labor with their first child, prompting him to go look for friends with money to lend to hire a midwife while a neighbor stays with her. Dodging a butcher he owes money, Hamouda asks his friend Fahlawi (Mounir al-Fangari) for money at a cafe, not knowing he was about to borrow from Hamouda to pay the cafe's expenses. The neighbor's very young son Adel summons him with news of Sharbat being in poor condition and asks for a doctor, who does it pro bono but is given money by Hamouda as a reward anyway.

Hamouda names the newborn Noor el-Ayoun (roughly translated as “apple of my eye”), and she grows up to be a girl who loves dance and becomes the greatest passion of Adel (Karem Mahmoud. Noor (Naima Akef) becomes a beautiful young woman and they fall in love. By coincidence, she goes to the theatre where Hamouda works and sings and dances to fill in for an absentee headliner, earning a standing ovation and a job offer from director Hanafi (Mahmoud el-Meliguy). Adel is disappointed that she has become a nouveau riche, but she stays with him despite gift-laden overtures from Hanafi. Singer Samira (Mona Fouad) tries to steer Hanafi away from the temptation and towards her arms, while Fahlawi, a composer, takes Adel to audition for another composer named Ali (Ezzat al-Jahili, who was one in real life). Adel meets Samira there and she introduces him to Hanafi.

When Adel begins singing on Hanafi's stage, his love for Noor becomes entangled with professional rivalry. Samira, now drawn to Adel, changes course and now attempts to split him from Noor by claiming that her career is only a bauble Hanafi is buying her for her love. Adel shoves Samira off a balcony in danger and she falls apparently to her death, whence he and Noor flee to Ali's house, as Hanafi learns when he arrives at Noor's house to have them arrested. Hanafi proposes marriage to her in exchange for a passport and money to help Adel escape trial for the murder, and she sacrifices her love by goading him with a false claim to be Hanafi's mistress as the late Samira had told him. Adel deduces that she is lying, however, and also uncovers that Samira is in fact alive, the passport forged, and the money counterfeit; he informs the police and marries Noor at last.

== Songs ==
The songs are composed by Karem Mahmoud, Ezzat al-Jahili, Ibrahim Hussein, Brahim Haggiag, and Aziz El-Shawan. Lyrics were written by Mustafa Abdel Rahman, Ahmed Mansour, Ibrahim Rajab, Abdel Aziz Salam, Hassan Abdelwahab, and Anwar Nafeh.

Songs in score
Title	Singer
“سنه وسنتين في غمضة عين” (“Years in the Blink of an Eye”)	Naima Akef
“مش عايزينها” (“I Don’t Want It”)	Naima Akef
“يا هل ترى بتجافي ليه” (“Now, Do See Why I Can’t?”)	Karem Mahmoud
“إستعراض المامبو” (“Mambo Revue”)	Naima Akef and Ali Rida
“موال عز الحبايب جفانى” (“Ezz al-Habayeb Jaffani”)	Karem Mahmoud
“قمر له ليالي” (“The Moon Has the Nights”)	Ezzat al-Jahili
“سمرا وشقرا” (“Samira and Chakra”)	Karem Mahmoud
“آه م الهوى آهين .. بروفة” (“Ahm al-Hawahin”)	Karem Mahmoud
