= Akher kedba =

- آخر كدبة
- Directed by: Ahmed Badrakhan
- Written by: Abo El Seoud El Ebiary
- Produced by: Farid al-Atrash
- Starring: Farid al-Atrash, Samia Gamal, Camelia
- Cinematography: Abdelhalim Nasr
- Edited by: Kamal El Sheikh
- Music by: Farid al-Atrash
- Production company: Studio Misr
- Release date: 12 November 1950
- Country: Egypt
- Language: Arabic

Akher kedba (Arabic: آخر كدبة, lit. "The Last Lie") is an Egyptian musical romantic comedy film released in 1950. It was produced by Farid al-Atrash and directed by Ahmed Badrakhan with a screenplay by Abo El Seoud El Ebiary, and it starred al-Atrash, Samia Gamal, Camelia, Ismail Yassine, and Abdel Salam Al Nabulsy.

== Synopsis ==
Singer Samir (al-Atrash) is married to dancer Samira Honolulu (Gamal) and they both work at the الربيع ("Spring") Casino. The jealous wife watches him like a hawk and forbids him to carry money. Riding a bus driven by a madman (Abdul Halim Al-Qalawi) charging no fare, Samir crashes into a tree and breaks the ribs of a lady named Jamila Hanim Asala (Yassine in drag), sending her to the hospital. Samir escapes and goes to the Casino, where his ex-girlfriend Kiki (Camelia) wants to rekindle their old relationship. Samir warns her of his wife's ire despite Kiki's insistent offers, including having her wealthy Indian Maharaja friend open another casino and having him sing at her birthday party. After Kiki complains, Samir is forced to sing and drink wine while Samira is away to visit family; Kiki offers him a candy necklace borrowed from the Maharaja that falls from his hand and breaks, earning a promise to fix it and passage back home drunk. Samira searches his pockets and finds the necklace, which he passes off as a gift for her along with an alibi from his friend Arnab (Yassine) stating that he was at the opera. However, the opera director (Zaki Ibrahim) blows his cover by calling her about his health after the bus accident and revealing that the opera was closed that day. Kiki comes to ask about the necklace, so Samir tells his wife Kiki is Arnab's fiancée. Samir's lies snowball as he calls the insurance company to claim a £E5,000 reward for his injury to pay for the necklace, prompting the company to send appraiser Amin Dam al-Hanak (Al Nabulsy) to determine eligibility since he didn't go to the hospital. Samir goes to the Casino, and when the doctor (Stephan Rosti) comes, Samira summons Arnab to be examined instead, but Samir and the representative arrive in time to encounter the doctor and Arnab. Kiki has revealed the necklace's whereabouts to the Maharaja, who arrives to the gathering with his translator Tartour (Sayed Abu Bakr) and threatens Samir with a pistol, only for the fleeing Samir to be sedated for fear of it being a consequence of his injury. The police prepare to arrest the Maharaja, actually a notorious jewelry thief (Abdul-Jabbar Metwally), and it comes out that Tartour was a criminal informant and Jamila was Arnab's aunt who Arnab asked to forgive Samir. Arnab marries Kiki, Samir promises his wife that Kiki was "the last lie," and Samira promises to tone down her jealousy.

== Cast ==
- Farid al-Atrash (Samir)
- Samia Gamal (Samira)
- Camelia (Kiki)
- Ismail Yassine (Arnab/Jamila)
- Abdel Salam Al Nabulsy (Amin Dam al-Hanak)
- Stephan Rosti (insurance doctor)
- Ali Al-Kassar
- Aziz Osman
- Sayed Abu Bakr
- Zaki Ibrahim
- Abdul Halim Al-Qalawi
- Abdel Moneim Ismail
- Gamalat Zayed
- Esmat Abdel Aalim

== Songs ==
All songs were composed and sung by Farid al-Atrash:

- "ما اهونش عليك" ("I Don't Care About You"), lyrics by Youssef Badros
- "أنا واللي بحبه" ("Me and the One I Love"), lyrics by Mamoun El-Shenawy
- "أوبريت بساط الريح" ("Operetta of the Flying Carpet"), lyrics by Bayram al-Tunisi, sung with Esmat Abdel Aalim
- "مانخبيش عليك" ("We Don't Want You"), lyrics by al-Tunisi
- "ما قللي وقلتله" ("What Did You Say?"), lyrics by Abo El Seoud El Ebiary

=== Basat Al-Reeh ===
Although there are several well-known songs from the film, "أوبريت بساط الريح" (also transliterated as Basat Al-Reeh for "Flying Carpet"), was controversial in Algeria, which went unmentioned among the titular carpet's six destinations, which included Syria, Lebanon, Tunisia, Marrakesh (Morocco), Baghdad (Iraq), and Egypt. Algerian singer Ali Maâchi responded with the riposte "أنغام الجزائر" ("Algerian Song").
