= The Sweetness of Love =

- يا حلاوة الحب
- Directed by: Hussein Fawzi
- Starring: Mohamed Fawzi; Naima Akef; Suleiman Naguib; Lola Sedki; Zeinat Sedki; Fouad Shafiq; Widad Hamdi; Mohamed Tawfik; Abdel Hamid Badawi
- Release date: October 29, 1952
- Country: Egypt
- Language: Arabic

The Sweetness of Love (Arabic: يا حلاوة الحب, transliterated as Ya Halawaat al-Hob) is an Egyptian film released in 1952. The film is based on the Franco-German film, A Night in Paradise, released in 1932 in German and the following year as Une nuit au paradis in French.

== Synopsis ==
Shukria (Lola Sedki) is a spoiled girl whose father Fouad Shafiq) fulfills her every command. She wants to marry the singer Nabil (Mohamed Fawzi) to inherit the fortune of his uncle (Suleiman Naguib). Shukria's father invites Nabil to a party to help her charm him. A clothing store attendant (Naima Akef) arrives and loves to sing and dance. Nabil and his uncle both fall in love with her at first sight.

== Songs ==
The songs in the film include lyrics by Abo El Seoud El Ebiary, Mamoun el-Shenawy, Mustafa al-Sayed, and Fathi Qura.
