= Heaven and Hell (1952 film) =

- جنة ونار
- Directed by: Hussein Fawzi
- Written by: Abo El Seoud El Ebiary
- Produced by: Hussein Fawzi
- Starring: Naima Akef; Abdel Aziz Mahmoud
- Music by: Abdel Aziz Mahmoud
- Release date: December 1, 1952
- Running time: 132 minutes
- Country: Egypt
- Language: Arabic

Heaven and Hell (Arabic: جنة ونار, transliterated Janna wa narr) is an Egyptian film released on December 1, 1952. The film is directed and produced by Hussein Fawzi, features a screenplay by Abo El Seoud El Ebiary, and stars Naima Akef, Abdel Aziz Mahmoud, and Shoukry Sarhan. The plot centers on the friendship between a poor orphan girl named Nancy and her neighbor Abdel Haq. He helps her support her six brothers as a dancer, but she does not reciprocate his affection.

== Cast ==
=== Main cast ===
- Naima Akef (Nancy, an orphan girl)
- Abdel Aziz Mahmoud (Abdel Haq, Nancy's neighbor)

== Supporting cast ==
- Hussein Riad
- Shoukry Sarhan
- Aziza Helmy
- Abdel Salam Al Nabulsy
- Abdel Rahim El Zarkany
- Ahmed Allam
- Widad Hamdi
- Abdel Ghani Nagdi
- Abdelmonem Ismail
- Ahmed Amer
- Abdel Moneim Bassiouni
- Abdul Hamid al-Qalawi
- Sayed al-Maghribi

=== Child cast ===
- Salwa el-Sayed
- Abdel Moneim Suleiman
- Wajih al-Atrash
- Magdy al-Sayed
- Inshirah Akef
- Felfela

== Synopsis ==
Nancy (Naima Akef), an orphan girl, works to support her six siblings. She has nobody to turn to in this except for her neighbor, the singer Abdel Haq (Abdel Aziz Mahmoud), who invites her into his troupe as a dancer and loves her unrequitedly. She gets to know Abdel Haq's uncle Maarouf (Hussein Riad), who lives in a palace like a prisoner of his daughter-in-law Qassem, who seeks to inherit his fortune after his death. Maarouf showers Nancy with gifts via his grandson who loves her, leading to misunderstandings and jealousy of him by Abdel Haq. The neighborhood convinces him to leave her be, so he travels to Alexandria to separate. Nancy ends up with him in the end, putting love over money.

== Songs ==
Songs in score
Title	Lyricist	Composer	Singer
"كلمني يومين واهجر تانى" ("Call on Me for Two Days and Leave Again")	Abdel Aziz Mahmoud	Abdel Aziz Mahmoud	Abdel Aziz Mahmoud
"اسكتش بياع الفول" ("Story of the Bean Seller")	Abdel Aziz Mahmoud	Abdel Aziz Mahmoud	Abdel Aziz Mahmoud, Naima Akef, and Abdel Ghani Nagdi
"معانا مامعاناش" ("What's Wrong with Us?")	Abdel Aziz Mahmoud	Abdel Aziz Mahmoud	Abdel Aziz Mahmoud and Naima Akef
"عا الطبل والمزمار" ("A Drum and an Oboe")	Abdel Aziz Mahmoud	Abdel Aziz Mahmoud	Abdel Aziz Mahmoud and Naima Akef
"أقدر على قلبي" ("I Appreciate My Love")	Abdel Aziz Mahmoud	Abdel Aziz Mahmoud	Abdel Aziz Mahmoud and Naima Akef
"اسكتش الحب جنه ونار" ("Love Theme from Heaven and Hell")	Abdel Aziz Mahmoud	Abdel Aziz Mahmoud	Abdel Aziz Mahmoud, Naima Akef, and Abdel Ghani Nagdi
"من قلبى بحبك" ("From My Heart, I Love You")	Abdel Aziz Mahmoud	Abdel Aziz Mahmoud	Abdel Aziz Mahmoud
"البكاء والحزن ليه؟ لست أدري" ("Why Am I Crying and Sad? I Do Not Know")	Abdel Aziz Mahmoud	Abdel Aziz Mahmoud	Naima Akef
