= Sea of Love (1955 film) =

- بحر الغرام
- Directed by: Hussein Fawzi
- Written by: Amin Yousseff Ghurab (dialogue and scenario); Hussein Fawzi (scenario)
- Produced by: Hussein Fawzi
- Starring: Naima Akef; Rushdy Abaza; Youssef Wahbi; Abdel Salam Al Nabulsy; Samiha Tawfik; Abdel Waress Assar
- Cinematography: Mohamed Abdel Azim
- Edited by: Attia Abdo
- Release date: November 13, 1955
- Running time: 106 minutes
- Country: Egypt
- Language: Arabic

Sea of Love (Arabic: بحر الغرام, transliterated as Ba’r al gharam) is an Egyptian film released in 1955.

== Synopsis ==
In a seaside village, a girl named Tuna (Naima Akef), daughter of Mr. Shehata Abu Daoud (Mahmoud Lotfi), falls in love with Amin (Rushdy Abaza), son of Mr. Mabrouk (Abdel Waress Asser), Mr. Shehata's co-owner of a fishing boat. Qamar (Samiha Tawfik), the wife of the miserly Mr. Ashour (El Sayed Bedeir), loves and tries to seduce Amin, and while he refuses, Tuna believes they are having an affair.

A great director named Wahbi (Youssef Wahbi) comes to the village with his friend and confidante Rashiq (Absul Salam Al Nabulsy). He admires Tuna's wit, sees her dancing, and wants to make her a star, but is rejected by Amin and the other villagers. A great storm capsizes the fishing boat, drowning Abu Daoud and injuring Amin. Tuna goes to Mr. Wahbi with Rizk (Mokhtar Hussein), one of the partners’ fishermen. Mr. Wahbi makes her a famous artist under the name Fitna. She asks him to treat Amin at his expense without his knowledge, and he agrees. Mr. Ashour, at the instigation of Qamar, claims to the villagers that he helped Amin recover instead, despising Tuna for her career path. Mr. Wahbi finally returns to town and clears up the truth about Tuna's honor and Amin's treatment as she retires from acting and returns to Amin.

== Cast ==
- Naima Akef (Tuna/Fitna)
- Rushdy Abaza (Amin Khatib Tuna)
- Youssef Wahbi (Mr. Wahbi, a director)
- Abdel Waress Asser (Mr. Mabrouk, father of Amin)
- Mahmoud Lotfi (Shehata Abu Daoud, Tuna's father)
- Abdel Salam Al Nabulsy (Rashiq, Mr. Wahbi's friend)
- El Sayed Bedeir (Mr. Ashour)
- Samiha Tawfik (Qamar, Mrs. Ashour)
- Mokhtar Hussein (Rizk, friend of Mabrouk and Shehata)

== Songs ==
The songs in the film feature lyrics by Abdel Fattah Mustafa and music by Hussein Junaid, Kamal Al Taweel (on the song “الريح نادي,” “Club of Wind”), and Ahmed Sedky (on “سهاري الليل,” “Late Night”).
