= Tamr Henna =

- Directed by: Hussein Fawzi
- Starring: Naima Akef, Rushdy Abaza, Ahmed Ramzy, Fayza Ahmed, Zinat Sed'i
- Release dates: 1957
- Country: Egypt
- Language: Arabic

Tamr Henna Arabic: تمر حنه ("Tamarind") is a 1957 Egyptian musical drama film directed by Hussein Fawzy. The film stars some of Egypt's most prominent stars of the era, including Ahmed Ramzy, Rushdy Abaza, Fayza Ahmed, Naima Akef, and Zeinat Sedki. Set in a time where gypsies still roamed Egypt freely and had their own areas of living. This movie tells the tale of a rich man falling in love with a gypsy and transforming her into a socialite in order for her to be accepted by his family, and so he can win a bet. However, as the movie progresses, a love triangle forms between the girl, the rich man, and the carnival's strong man, and that leads to heightened drama.

== Plot ==
The movie takes place in Egypt, 1957, where gypsies still roamed and had designated living areas where they could go about their lives. In this particular gypsy living area, there is a carnival where Tamr Henna, the main character, works along with Hassan, the carnival's strong man and her love interest at the beginning of the movie.

During the first part of the movie, Tamr Henna is a belly dancer, coveted by all sorts of men, both rich and poor. Hassan is jealous. During one of Tamr Henna's belly dancing performances, a rich man by the name of Ahmed sees her and strikes up a conversation. Hassan is displeased and vows to kill him, so Tamr Henna goes to Ahmed's mansion to warn him but gets caught by Ahmed's father, who sees her as nothing but a useless gypsy.

Tamr Henna manages to escape the makeshift prison in which Ahmed's father locks her up, and warns Ahmed. The two then start meeting up and Ahmed convinces Tamr Henna to live with him in his mansion and promises to transform her into a socialite. He changes her name to Yasmine, buys her new clothes, and in the process convinces his father that she is from a very wealthy family. Meanwhile, Hassan searches for Tamr Henna but is unable to find her.

As the movie progresses Ahmed's father starts coveting Tamr Henna for himself, because of the money he thinks she has, and so he hosts a party at which he plans to propose to her. During this glamorous party, Hassan manages to find her, with the help of Ahmed's ex-fiancé and socialite Maysa, and vows that he will kill her. She finds out, reveals herself as a fake, and tells everyone her true occupation and origin. She flees to try to find Ahmed only to overhear him talking about the bet that he has made with his neighbor in order to fool his father. Tamr Henna is devastated and runs to her room only to find Hassan waiting for her with a knife in hand. She professes her love to him, but he stabs her. Whilst she is bleeding she says that she still loves him and he carries her back to the carnival. It is implied that Tamr Henna recovers and ends up marrying Hassan.

== Cast ==
Main characters:

- Ahmed Ramzy as Ahmed
- Rushdy Abaza as Hassan
- Naima Akef as Tamr Henna

Supporting actors:

- Fayza Ahmed as Tamr Henna's helper and friend
- Zeinat Sedki as Maysa, a socialite interested in Ahmed

== Production and direction ==
The movie Tamr Henna was produced and directed by Hussein Fawzi, an Egyptian film maker who studied fine arts in Italy and worked as an illustrator and designer. Fawzi started off as an actor then pursued a career in directing. He directed many notable works with his wife Naima Akef, most prominently Tamr Henna.

== Writing ==
In addition to being produced and directed by Hussein Fawzi, he also had a major role in writing the movie along with Galil El Bendary. Together they collaborated to write a movie that is considered one of the best movies to ever be shown on Egyptian screens. Tamr Henna is considered one of Egypt's most valuable classics.

== Music ==
Even though the movie Tamr Henna had but a few songs, it is known to have one of the most memorable and influential sound tracks. The music that was written for this particular movie is still widely listened to today and many dancers use its soundtrack as music for their dancing. The songs included are all from the album Tamr Henna (1957) and all sung by Fayza Ahmed. Songs from the album are:

- "Yamal el qamar albab", composed by Mohamed Almougi, written by Mursi Gameel Aziz
- "Ya Tamr Henna", composed by Mohamed Almougi, written by Jaleel Bendari
- "Ammar Mnesabr", composed by Mohamed Almougi, written by Jaleel Bendari
- "Qalbi alak ya khai", composed by Mohamed Almougi, written by Mursi Gameel Aziz
