= Ismail Yassine in the Navy =

- Directed by: Fatin Abdel Wahab
- Written by: Hassan Tawfik; El Sayed Bedir
- Produced by: Khalil Diab; Ramses Naguib; Gamal El Leithy
- Starring: Ismail Yassine; Zahret El-Ola; Ahmed Ramzy; Zeinat Sedki
- Cinematography: Abdel Aziz Fahmy
- Music by: Mounir Mourad
- Release date: 11 November 1957
- Running time: 95 minutes
- Country: Egypt
- Language: Arabic

Ismail Yassine in the Navy (Egyptian Arabic: اسماعيل ياسين فى الأسطول, romanized: Ismail Yassine fi El Ostool) is a 1957 Egyptian comedy film directed by Fatin Abdel Wahab.

== Plot ==
In this 1957 comedy, two cousins fall in love and wish to get married. The mother of the girl opposes the marriage, and would rather have her daughter marry a rich old man. To speed up the marriage, the girl asks her lover to join the navy so that her mother would agree to their marriage.

== Cast ==
- Ismail Yassine as Ragab
- Zahret El Ola as Nadia
- Ahmed Ramzy as Mounir
- Mahmoud El-Meliguy as Abbas El Zefr
- Zeinat Sedki as Nadia's mother

== See also ==
- Cinema of Egypt
- Lists of Egyptian films
- List of Egyptian films of the 1950s
