= Samia Gamal =

Egyptian belly dancer and actress (1924–1994)

- سامية جمال
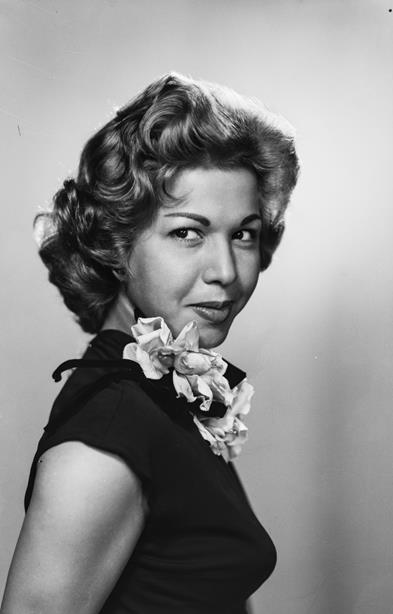
- Samia Gamal by Armand
- Born: Zeinab Ali Khalil Ibrahim Mahfouz; 5 March 1924; Asyut, Kingdom of Egypt
- Died: 1 December 1994 (aged 70); Cairo, Egypt
- Occupations: Actress; belly dancer
- Years active: 1939–1972
- Spouse: Rushdy Abaza (m. 1958; div. 1977)

Zeinab Ali Khalil Ibrahim Mahfouz (Arabic: زينب علي خليل إبراهيم محفوظ; 5 March 1924 – 1 December 1994), known professionally as Samia Gamal (سامية جمال), was an Egyptian belly dancer and film actress. Gamal performed in more than 50 movies during her career. She is regarded as one of the most prominent Egyptian belly dancers in the golden era of Egyptian cinema.

After working as an extra in films such as The Determination (1939), she became a leading lady in a number of Egyptian cinema classics, such as Red Lipstick (1946), Lady Ghost (1949), The Hawk, The Count of Monte Cristo (both 1950), The Monster (1954), The Second Man (1959), and Sukkar Hanem (1960). In 1949, she was made the National Dancer of Egypt by King Farouk I. Gamal's influence extended beyond the realms of Arabic cinema. She is credited with bringing belly dancing from Egypt to Hollywood and from there to the schools of Europe. In 1954, she starred as a belly dancer in the American film Valley of the Kings and the French film Ali Baba and the Forty Thieves. She also appeared in the Italian film Hawk of the Nile (1950).

Gamal officially retired from cinema in 1972. She returned briefly on stage in 1984 before devoting herself exclusively to dance until the early 1990s.

== Biography ==
Samia Gamal was born in Asyut Governorate in March 1924, Samia's family moved just months later to Cairo and settled near the Khan El-Khalili bazaar. It was many years later that Samia Gamal met Badia Masabni, the owner of a big Cairo nightclub back then. Badia offered Samia an invitation to join her dance company, which Samia accepted. Badia Masabni gave her the stage name Samia Gamal, and she began her dance career.

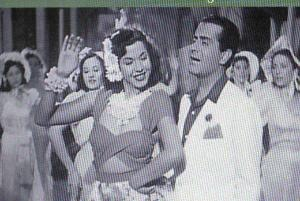
Samia Gamal and Farid Al-Attrach in the Egyptian film Little Miss Devil (Afrita hanem) (1949)

At first, she studied under Badia and Badia's star dancer at the time, Tahiya Karioka. However she soon became a respected soloist and brought forth her own style. Samia Gamal incorporated techniques from ballet and Latin dance into her solo performances. She was also the first to perform with high-heeled shoes on stage. She starred in dozens of Egyptian films next to the famous Farid Al Attrach. They could be thought of as the Fred Astaire and Ginger Rogers of the Middle East. They not only played each other's love interest on the silver screen but also in real life. However, their love was not meant to be. Because of Farid's social position, he refused to marry Samia. Farid believed that marriage kills artist talent, he never married. Some claim that Farid as a Druze prince, told her it would bring too much shame to his family for him to marry a belly dancer; but the claim is baseless. Farid helped place Samia on the National Stage by risking all he owned, and managed to borrow to produce a film (Habib al omr) co-starring with her in 1947.

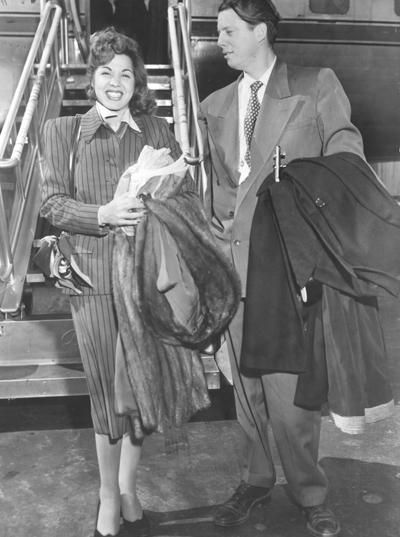
Samia Gamal with her husband Shepherd King III in July 1954

In 1949, Egypt's King Farouk proclaimed Samia Gamal "The National Dancer of Egypt", which brought US attention to the dancer. In 1950, Samia came to the US and was photographed by Gjon Mili. She also performed in the Latin Quarter, New York's trendy nightclub. She later married the so-called "Texas millionaire" Shepherd King III—who, it was later reported, had only about $50,000. Their marriage did not last long.

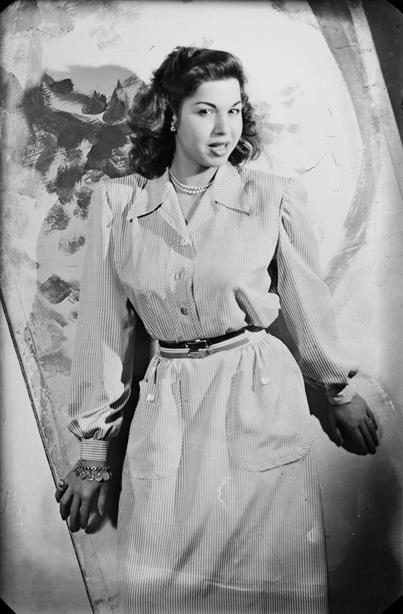
Samia Gamal, 1950

In 1958, Samia Gamal married Rushdy Abaza, one of the most famous Egyptian actors with whom Samia starred in a number of films, notably the box-office hit The Second Man (1959) alongside Egypt's iconic actor Salah Zulfikar, one of the most famous Egyptian actors, and Sabah, famous actress and singer and directed by the legendary Egyptian film director Ezz El-Dine Zulficar, this film became an Egyptian masterpiece and the most notable role in Samia Gamal's cinematic career. In 1972, she stopped dancing when she was nearly in her 50s but began again after given advice by Samir Sabri. She then danced until the early 1980s.

Samia Gamal died on 1 December 1994, at 70 years of age in Cairo. Samia's charismatic performances in Egyptian and international films gave Egypt's Oriental Dance recognition and admiration in Egypt and worldwide.

== Tribute ==
On 5 March 2017, Google dedicated a Doodle to the actress for the 93rd anniversary of her birth. The Doodle reached all the countries of the Arab world.

== Filmography ==
- Samia Forever (Documentary, 2003)
- Fabulous Samia Gamal, The, (Documentary, 2003)
- The Stars of Egypt: Volume 3: Samia Gamal, Part I (Film, 19??)
- The Stars of Egypt: Volume 3: Samia Gamal, Part II (Film, 19??)
- Saat al-Sifr (Film, 1972)
- al-Shaytan wa-al-Kharif (Film, 1972)
- Bint al-Hatah (Film, 1964)
- Zuqaq al-Madaq (Film, 1963)
- Tarik al shaitan a.k.a. The Way of the Devil (Film, 1963)
- Marhaban Ayuha al-Hubb (Film, 1962)
- Abu al-Layl (Film, 1962)
- Waada el hub a.k.a. And Love Returned (Film, 1961)
- Sukar Hanim (Film, 1960)
- Wa Ada al-Hubb (Film, 1960)
- Nagham el hazine, El a.k.a. Sad Melody (Film, 1960)
- El Ragul el thani, El a.k.a. The Second Man (Film, 1959)
- Kull daqqa fi qalbi a.k.a. Every Beat of My Heart (Film, 1959)
- Maweed maa maghoul a.k.a. Rendezvous with a Stranger (Film, 1959)
- Gharam al-miliunayr a.k.a. Love of the Millionaire (Film, 1957)
- Habiby al-Asmar (Film, 1957)
- Desert Warrior a.k.a. Desert Warrior (Film, 1956)
- Zanubah (Film, 1956)
- Awwal Gharam (Film, 1956)
- Masque de Toutankhamon, Le a.k.a. Trésor des pharaons, Le (Film, 1955)
- Sigarah wa kas a.k.a. A Glass and a Cigarette (Film, 1955)
- Ali Baba et les quarante voleurs a.k.a. Ali Baba; Ali Baba wa-al-Arbain Harami; Ali Baba and the Forty Thieves (1954 film) (Film, 1954)
- Valley of the Kings (Film, 1954)
- Nachala hanem a.k.a. The Lady Pickpocket (Film, 1952)
- Raqsat al-wadah a.k.a. The Farewell Dance (Film, 1954)
- Ketar el lail a.k.a. The Night Train (Film, 1953)
- Al-wahsh a.k.a. The Monster (Film, 1952)
- Ma takulshi la hada a.k.a. Tell No-one; Don't Tell Anyone (Film, 1952)
- Intiqam al-Habib (Film, 1951)
- Khad al-Jamil (Film, 1951)
- Taa la salim a.k.a. Come and Say Hello (Film, 1951)
- Asmar wa-Jamil (Film, 1950)
- Akher kedba a.k.a. The Final Lie (Film, 1950)
- Sat al-Husn (Film, 1950)
- Amir al-Intiqam a.k.a. The Count of Monte Cristo (Film, 1950)
- Sakr, El a.k.a. The Falcon (Film, 1950)
- Nuit des étoiles, La (Film, 1950)
- Afrita hanem a.k.a. Lady Afrita; Lady Genie; Little Miss Devil; The Genie Lady (Film, 1949)
- Agaza fel gahannam a.k.a. Holidays in Hell (Film, 1949)
- Bahebbak inta a.k.a. I Love You Only (Film, 1949)
- Hawk of the Nile (Film, 1949)
- Bint al-Haz (Film, 1948)
- Mughamer, El a.k.a. The Adventurer (Film, 1948)
- Sahibat el amara a.k.a. The Landlady (Film, 1948)
- El Ahdab a.k.a. The Hunchback (Film, 1947)
- El Ersane talata a.k.a. The Three Suitors (Film, 1947)
- Habib al omr a.k.a. The Love of My Life (Film, 1947)
- al-Bani adam a.k.a. Sons of Adam (Film, 1945)
- Sharazad (film) (Film, 1945)
- Ahmar Shafayif (Film, 1945)
- Al-Jins al-Latif (Film, 1945)
- Taxi hantur a.k.a. A Hansom Carriage (Film, 1945)
- Al-hub al-Awwal (Film, 1945)
- Abnaty (film, 1944)
- Russassa fil al-Qalb a.k.a. A Bullet in the Heart (Film, 1944)
- Khafaya al-Madinah (Film, 1943)
- Min Fat Qadimuh (Film, 1943)
- Mamnu al-Hob (Film, 1943)
- Ali Baba wa al arbain harame a.k.a. Ali Baba and the Forty Thieves (Film, 1942)
- Gawhara (Film, 1942)

== See also ==
- List of dancers
- Women in dance
