= Ali Baba and the Forty Thieves (1954 film) =

- Directed by: Jacques Becker
- Written by: Cesare Zavattini; Jacques Becker; Marc Maurette; Maurice Griffe; André Tabet
- Produced by: Adry De Carbuccia; Roland Girard; Jean Goiran; René Gaston Vuattoux
- Starring: Fernandel; Samia Gamal; Dieter Borsche
- Cinematography: Robert Lefebvre
- Edited by: Marguerite Renoir
- Music by: Paul Misraki
- Production company: Les Films du Cyclope
- Distributed by: Cinédis
- Release date: 21 December 1954
- Running time: 92 minutes
- Country: France
- Language: French

Ali Baba and the Forty Thieves (French: Ali Baba et les 40 voleurs) is a 1954 French comedy film directed by Jacques Becker and starring Fernandel, Samia Gamal and Dieter Borsche. It was made at the Billancourt Studios in Paris. The film's sets were designed by Georges Wakhévitch. Some scenes were shot on location in French Morocco.

== Cast ==
- Fernandel as Ali Baba
- Samia Gamal as Morgiane
- Dieter Borsche as Abdel, bandit chief
- Henri Vilbert as Cassim
- Édouard Delmont as Père de Morgiane
- Edmond Ardisson as Mendiant
- Manuel Gary as Mendiant
- Julien Maffre as Mendiant
- Leopoldo Francés
- Gaston Orbal as Mufti
- Bob Ingarao as Un bandit
- Yôko Tani
- Fanfan Minucci
- José Casa as Mendiant
- Abdelhaq Chraibi
- Mohamed Gabsi
- Piella Sorano
- Micheline Gary
- Abdelkader Belkhodja as Mendiant

== Bibliography ==
- Lieve Spaas. Francophone Film: A Struggle for Identity. Manchester University Press, 2000.
