= Les Misérables (1944 film) =

- Directed by: Kamal Selim
- Written by: Badi Khayri; Kamal Selim; Michelle Telhami
- Based on: Les Misérables; 1862 novel by Victor Hugo
- Produced by: Michelle Telhami
- Starring: Abdel Hai Shafya; Ahmed Latifa Amin
- Cinematography: Sammy Brill; Hassan Dahesh; Sammy Brill
- Edited by: Kamal El-Shaikh
- Music by: Saleh Abdel Hai; Shafya Ahmed; Zakaria Ahmed; Farid Ghosn; Badi Khayri
- Release date: October 4, 1943 (Egypt)
- Running time: 120 minutes
- Country: Egypt
- Language: Egyptian

El Boassa is a 1944 Egyptian film. It is an adaptation of Victor Hugo's novel, Les Misérables and stars Amina Rizk and Abbas Fares.

== Cast ==
- Saleh Abdel Hai
- Shafya Ahmed
- Latifa Amin
