= Wife Number 13 =

1962 film

- Directed by: Fatin Abdel Wahab
- Written by: Abo El Seoud El Ebiary
- Starring: Shadia; Rushdy Abaza
- Cinematography: Kamal Korayem
- Release date: 24 June 1962
- Running time: 97 minutes
- Country: Egypt
- Language: Arabic

Wife Number 13 (Arabic: الزوجة ١٣, translit. Al Zouga talattashar) is a 1962 Egyptian film, written by Abo El Seoud El Ebiary and directed by Fatin Abdel Wahab. It was entered into the 12th Berlin International Film Festival.

== Cast ==
- Shadia as Aida Saber Abdel Saboor
- Rushdy Abaza as Mourad Salem
- Abdel Moneim Ibrahim as Ibrahim
- Shwikar as Karima
- Hassan Fayek as Saber Abdel Saboor
- Widad Hamdy as Boumba
- Shahab Nassim as Kamal Fahmi
