= Nour Al Hoda =

Lebanese singer and actress (1924–1998)

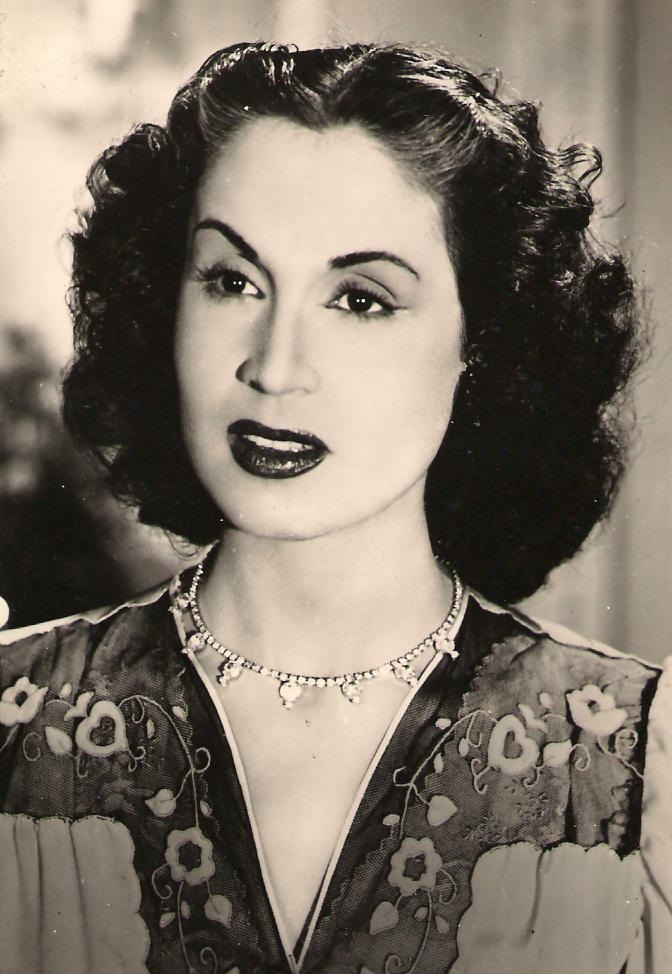
- Nour Al Hoda in 1950
- Born: Alexandra Nicolas Badran; 24 December 1924; Mersin, Turkey
- Died: 9 July 1998 (aged 73); Beirut, Lebanon
- Occupations: Singer, actress
- Known for: Egyptian cinema
- Notable work: Berlanti (1944)

Alexandra Nicolas Badran, also known as Nour Al Hoda (Arabic: نور الهدى; 24 December 1924 – 9 July 1998), was a Lebanese singer and actress, mostly known for her notable roles in Egyptian cinema. She has recorded over one hundred songs and worked in over thirty films.

== Biography ==
She was born on 24 December 1924 in Mersin, Turkey to an Antiochian Orthodox family. She was a maternal first cousin to Lebanese actress and singer Ferial Karim (Vera Semaan). One article in Egypt claimed that she was a maternal first cousin to Lebanese singer Jeanette Feghali, known as Sabah, and her sister Lebanese actress Lamia Feghali, but this information remains to be confirmed.

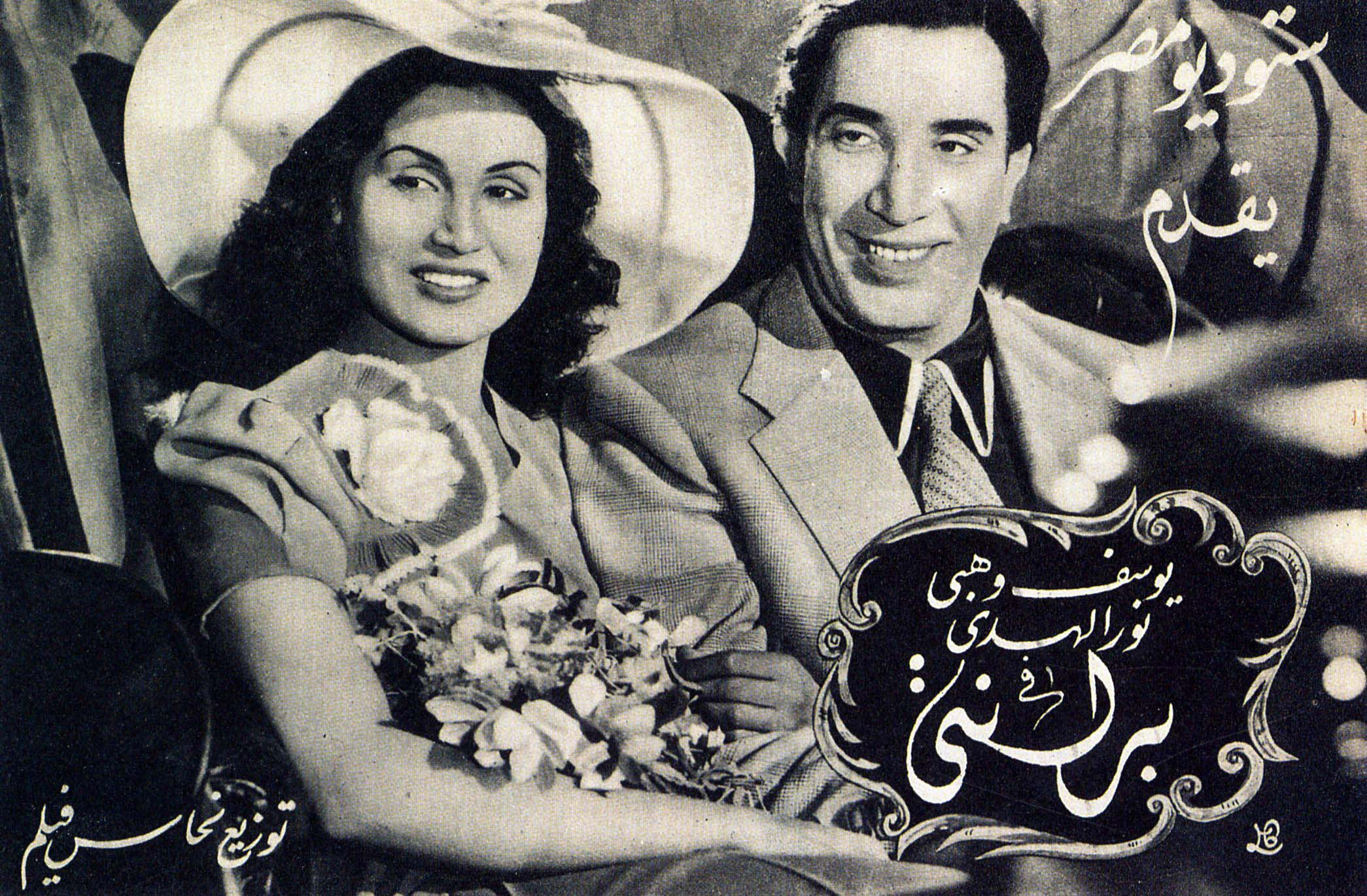
Nour Al Hoda with Youssef Wahbi in a publicity still for Berlanti (1944)

In 1943, she moved to Egypt to work in the Egyptian cinema. She worked in her first film Gawhara, with director-actor Youssef Wahbi. Following the success of Gawhara, Hoda went on to work with Wahbi in the 1944 film Berlanti. Followed by Amirat al ahlam (1945) and Al-anissa Busa (1945), she also acted in Lastu Malakan (1946) with Mohammed Abdel Wahab and Laila Fawzi. Hoda worked in Egypt until the early 1950s.

== Selected filmography ==
- Gawhara (1943)
- Al-sharaf ghali (1943)
- Berlanti (1944)
- Amirat al ahlam (1945)
- Al-anissa Busa (1945)
- Majd wa demoue (1946)
- Lastu malakan (1947)
- Matoulsh Lhad (1952)
