= Naima Akef =

Egyptian belly dancer, film actress, acrobat, and performer

- نعيمة عاكف
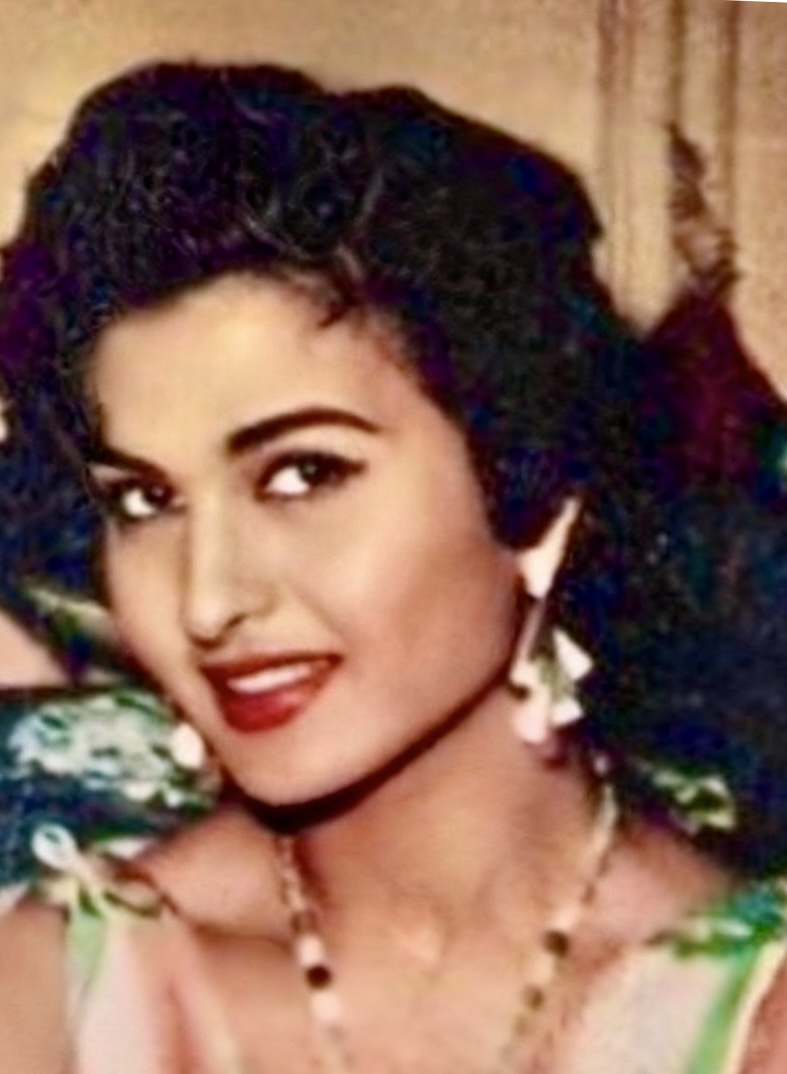
- Akef in 1960
- Pronunciation: næˈʕiːmæ ˈʕæːkef
- Born: 7 October 1929; Tanta, Egypt
- Died: 23 April 1966 (aged 36)
- Occupation: Actress • bellydancer
- Spouse(s): Salaheldeen Abdel Aleem; Hussein Fawzy
- Children: 1

Naima Akef (Arabic: نعيمة عاكف, pronounced [næˈʕiːmæ ˈʕæːkef]; 7 October 1929 – 23 April 1966) was an Egyptian belly dancer and actress. She was prolific during the Egyptian cinema's golden age and starred in many films of the time.

== Background ==
Akef was born in Tanta on the Nile Delta. Her parents were acrobats in the Akef Circus (run by her grandfather), which was one of the best known circuses at the time.

She started performing in the circus at the age of four, and quickly became one of the most popular acts with her acrobatic skills. Her family was based in the Bab el Khalq district of Cairo, but they traveled far and wide in order to perform.

== Career ==
=== Dancing ===
The circus disbanded when Akef was 14, but this was only the beginning of her career. Her grandfather had many connections in the performance world of Cairo and he introduced her to his friends. When Akef's parents divorced, she formed an acrobatic and clown act that performed in many clubs throughout Cairo. She then got the chance to work in Badia Masabni's famous nightclub, where she became a star and was one of the very few who danced and sang. Her time with Badeia, however, was short-lived, as Badia favored her, which made the other performers jealous. One day they ganged up on her and attempted to beat her up, but she proved to be stronger and more agile and won the fight. This caused her to be fired, so she started performing elsewhere.

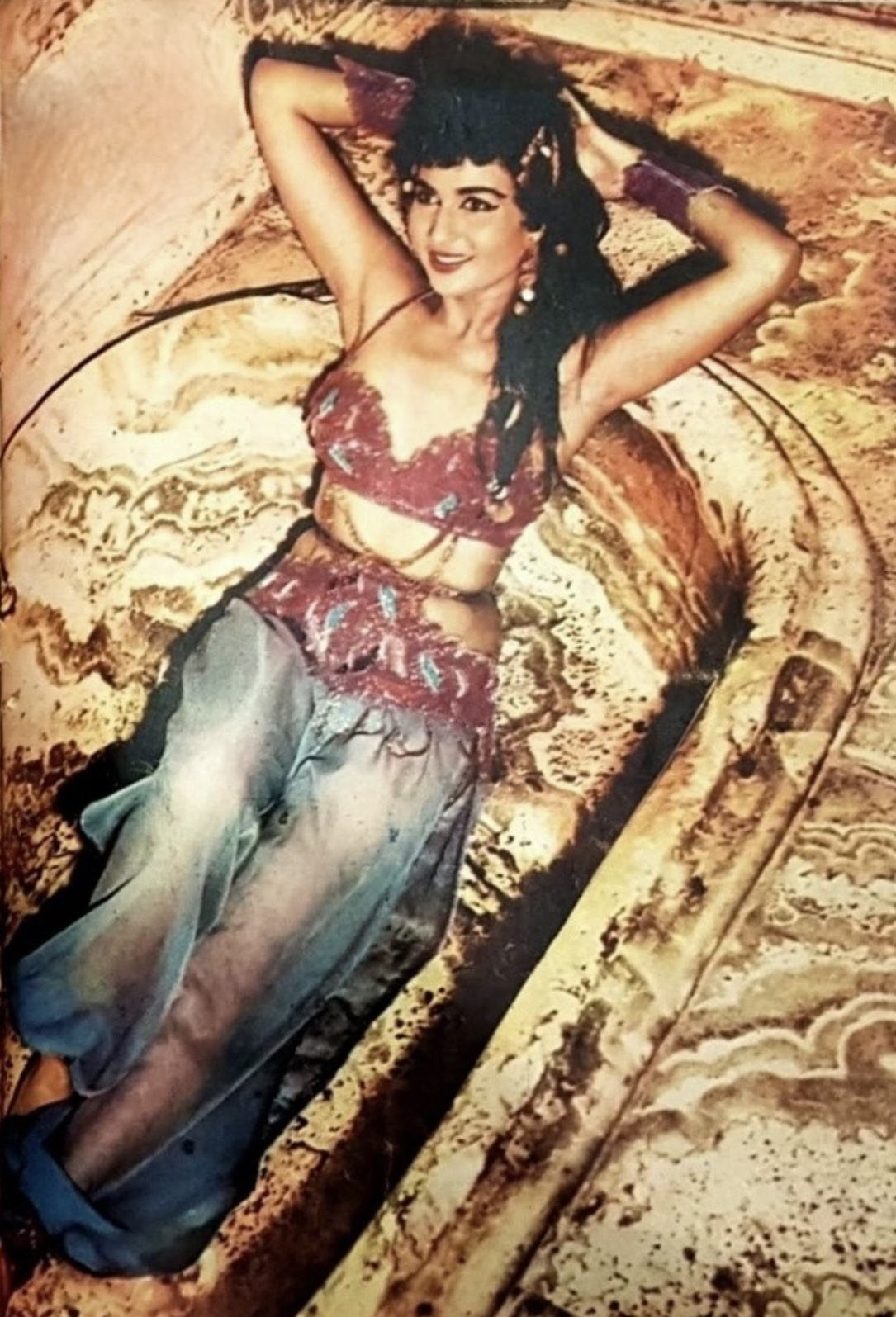
Naima Akef

=== A star ===
The Kit Kat club was another famous venue in Cairo, and this is where Akef was introduced to film director Abbas Kemal. His brother Hussein Fawzy, also a film director, was very interested in having Akef star in one of his musical films. The first of such films was “Al-Eïch wal malh” (bread and salt). Her costar was singer Saad Abdel Wahab, the nephew of the legendary singer and composer Mohammed Abdel Wahab. The film premiered on 17 January 1949, and was an instant success, bringing recognition also to Nahhas Film studios.

== Retirement and death ==
Akef quit acting in 1964 to take care of her only child, a son from her second marriage to accountant Salaheldeen Abdel Aleem. She died two years later from cancer, on April 23, 1966, at the age of 36.

== Filmography ==
- Aish Wal Malh (1949)
- Lahalibo (1949)
- Baladi Wa Khafa (1950)
- Furigat (1951)
- Baba Areess (1950)
- Fataat Al Sirk (1951)
- Al Namr (1952)
- Heaven and Hell (1952)
- Ya Halawaat Al Hubb (1952)
- A Million Pounds (1953)
- Arbah Banat Wa Zabit (1954)
- Delight of My Eyes (1954)
- Aziza (1955)
- Sea of Love (1955)
- Tamr Henna (1957)
- Amir El Dahaa (1964)
