= The Monster (1954 film) =

1954 film

- Directed by: Salah Abu Seif
- Written by: Salah Abu Seif; El Sayed Bedeir; Naguib Mahfouz
- Starring: Mahmoud El-Meliguy
- Cinematography: Abdelhalim Nasr
- Release date: 1954
- Running time: 115 minutes
- Country: Egypt
- Language: Arabic

The Monster (Arabic: الوحش, romanized: Ell Wahsh) is a 1954 Egyptian crime film directed by Salah Abouseif. It was entered into the 1954 Cannes Film Festival. It was one of the first films to be labelled as a "social documentary thriller" by cinema writer Georges Sadoul for its use of documentary style, depictions of police abuse, and backdrop of life in the Egyptian countryside.

== Plot ==
Abdel Sabour (Mahmoud El-Meliguy) is a thief and a smuggler known as The Beast. He wreaks havoc in a village in upper Egypt, where everyone is afraid of him, including the police. He enjoyed the protection of Redwan Pasha (Abbas Fares) who in turn used him as an assassin to eliminate his rivals. Assigned to arrest The Beast, Officer Raouf Saleh was sent to the village, together with his wife and son. The Beast and his gang work together, trying to dispose of the officer and his family, in every way possible.

== Cast ==
- Anwar Wagdi
- Mahmoud El-Meliguy as Al Wahsh
- Samia Gamal as Nassana
- Abbas Fares as Redwan Pasha
- Samihah Ayyoob as Tahiyyah
- Metawee Eweiss as Informer
- Abdelghani Kamar as Member of gang'El wahsh
- Said Khalil as Shawky Affandi
- Nazim Shaarawy as Member of gang'El wahsh
- Mohammed Tawfik as Khorny
