= Berlanti (film) =

1944 film

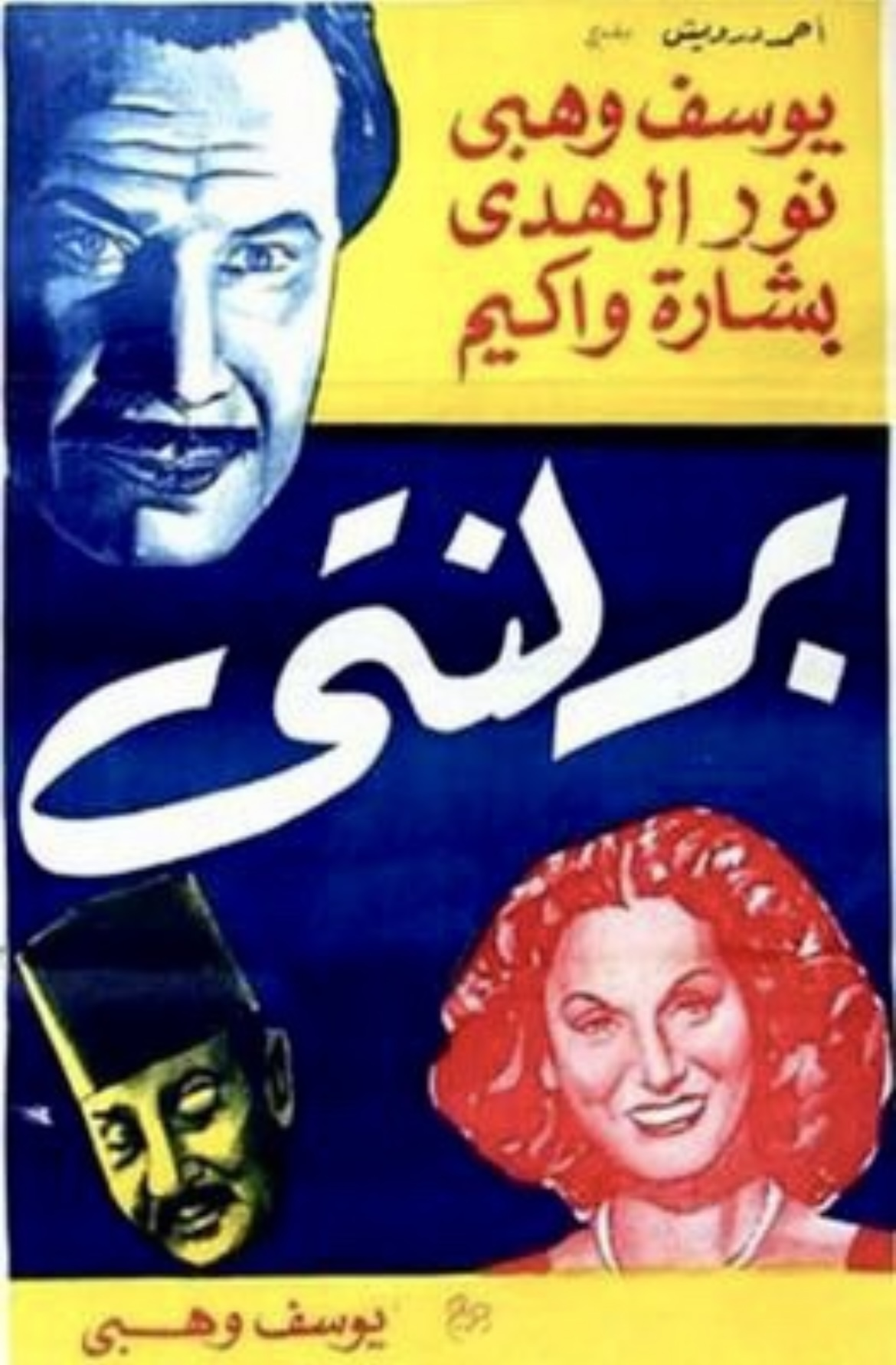
- Film poster
- Directed by: Youssef Wahbi
- Written by: Youssef Wahbi
- Produced by: Ahmed Darwish
- Starring: Youssef Wahbi; Nour Al Hoda
- Cinematography: Mohamed Abdel Azim
- Music by: Riad Al Sunbati; Mohamed El Qasabgi; Mohamed El Kahlawy
- Production company: Studio Misr
- Distributed by: Studio Misr
- Release date: 1 January 1944
- Running time: 109 minutes
- Country: Egypt
- Language: Egyptian Arabic

Berlanti (Arabic: برلنتى) is a 1944 Egyptian drama film written, directed by and starring Youssef Wahbi and Nour Al Hoda. It was produced by Ahmed Darwish for Studio Misr and was released on January 1, 1944 by Studio Misr.

== Synopsis ==
After the death Berlanti's father, she became depressed and her mother becomes ill, so Berlanti is forced to work as a singer so that she can be pay for her mother's treatment. The lawyer Sami marries her. Berlanti sees that she is standing in the way of Sami's success. She sacrifices her reputation so that he can leave her. He believes this and expels her and they got divorced. He marries the Samiha anfter and then Berlanti is accused of murder. And Samy steps up to defend her.

== Staff ==
- Directed and written by: Youssef Wahbi
- Cinematography: Mohamed Abdel Azim
- Music:
  - Riad Al Sunbati
  - Mohamed El Qasabgi
  - Mohamed El Kahlawy
- Producer: Ahmed Darwish
- Production studio: Studio Misr
- Distributor: Studio Misr
- Costumes: Helmy Rafla

== Cast ==
- Youssef Wahbi as Sami Khairat
- Nour Al Hoda as Berlanti
- Amina Rizk as Samiha Hanem
- Alwiya Gamil as Munira Hanem Shafi'i
- Fouad Shafiq as Khurshid Bey
- Mahmoud el-Meliguy ad Abbas Tohamy
- Bishara Wakim as Sami's friend
- Abdul Aleem Khattab as Shakib
- Abdel Salam Al Nabulsy as Abbas's friend
- Lotfi Al-Hakim as Ali Khairat
- Zeinat Sedki as Fifi
- Hassan el-Baroudi as Jewelry Store Owner

== See also ==
- Egyptian cinema
- List of Egyptian films of the 1940s
