= The Millionaire (1950 film) =

1950 film by Helmy Rafla

The Millionaire (Arabic: المليونير, romanized: El Millioner) is an Egyptian comedy film released in 1950. It was directed as a black and white movie by Helmy Rafla, and starred the famous comedian Ismail Yassine,

== Plot ==
A millionaire named Assem El Estleeny (Ismail Yassine) with all of the riches gets stuck in a murder case. So in order to flee, he finds a man who looks exactly like him, Gmeez Asal (also played by Ismail Yassine). Gmeez Asal covers up for Asseem while he gets away for a week.

== Main cast ==
- Zeinat Sedki as Baheega
- Su’ad Makkawi as Sukkara
- Camelia as Rooh el fo’ad
- Ismail Yassine as Assem/Gmeez
- Salah Mansour as Madman
- Wedad Hamdy as Sania
- Seraj Munir as Antar
- Estafan Rosti as Zaki Bashtekha
