= Gawhara =

1943 Egyptian film

- Directed by: Youssef Wahbi
- Produced by: Gabriel Nahas
- Starring: Youssef Wahbi; Nour Al Hoda
- Production company: Nahas Films
- Release date: 1943
- Country: Egypt
- Language: Egyptian Arabic

Gawhara (Egyptian Arabic: جوهره) is a 1943 Egyptian film directed by Youssef Wahbi and produced by Gabriel Nahas. The film stars Youssef Wahbi, Nour Al Hoda, Hassan Fayek, and Zuzoo Shakib. It was produced by Nahas Films and released in 1943.

== Plot ==
The most famous composer, Samir Wagdy (played by Youssef Wahbi), attempts suicide in the Nile following an emotional shock. He writes a note and leaves it beside his coat on the Corniche, but a poor girl named Felafel (played by Nour Al Hoda) who works collecting palm leaves meets him and convinces him to reconsider. He takes her to his villa and discovers that the press and the public believed that he committed suicide after finding the note he left on the Corniche. He takes advantage of the opportunity to see what the audience and critics will say about him after they believed he was dead. In the meantime, Felafel learns the basics of singing and he decides to give her a stage name, "Gawhara," and creates a musical operetta for her.

Felafel falls in love with Samir, and the singer Attiyat (played by Zuzoo Shakib), Samir's former colleague, discovers that he is still alive. She tries to win him over but fails, and Samir discovers her deception and exposes her to the press, revealing that he is still alive. Samir returns to the artistic scene and is offered a role in the operetta by his friend Fathy Bey (played by Hassan Fayek), who is the director of the theater. Fathy Bey promises to finance the operetta in exchange for Samir's participation and for introducing him to a girl he loves. However, Samir discovers that the girl is not talented and is unsuitable for the operetta. Fathy Bey decides to prevent her from going to perform on the opening night. Samir gives up his pride and goes to her house to persuade her to sing, but Fathy Bey and his men beat him up and leave him in front of the villa gate. Felafel meets him there and he decides that she will sing in the operetta as she has memorized all his tunes since he taught her at his house. The operetta becomes a huge success, and Samir goes to congratulate Felafel, finding her embracing a young man. He thinks that this young man is her boyfriend, so he decides to leave the country. While waiting inside the train, he is surprised by Fathy Bey, Felafel, and the young man she was hugging, who reveals that he is Felafel's brother and worked at the theater without her knowing. She hugged him happily, and happiness returns to Samir's heart as he decides to marry Felafel.

== Production ==
The film was produced by Gabriel Nahas and made by Nahas Films. It was Nour Al Hoda's debut film. Nour Al Hoda suffered an accident while filming a scene with co-star Youssef Wahbi. In one scene, Nour Al Hoda was riding on the back of a car driven by Youssef Wahbi while singing the song "Tair Ya Automobile." As the car sped up, Nour Al Hoda fell, and her singing turned to cries of pain. Unbeknownst to viewers, the scene was not staged, and Nour Al Hoda had actually fallen, injuring her face and right eye.The incident left Al Hoda with a temporarily impaired vision in her right eye. Despite initial predictions that the issue would resolve within days, Al Hoda experienced partial vision obstruction for ten years until she underwent corrective surgery. Throughout this period, Wahbi felt responsible for the accident and was relieved when Al Hoda eventually made a full recovery.

== Cast ==
- Youssef Wahbi
- Nour Al Hoda
- Zouzou Shakib
- Fouad Shafiq
- Hassan Fayek
- Samira Kamal
- Fakher Fakher
- Abdel Aleem Khattab
- Riad El Kasabgi
- Mohamed El Kahlaoui

== Release and reception ==
Gawhara was released in 1943 in Egypt. The success of the film led Wahbi to cast Nour Al Hoda is his 1944 film Berlanti.
