= Camelia (actress) =

Egyptian actress (1929–1950)

- كاميليا
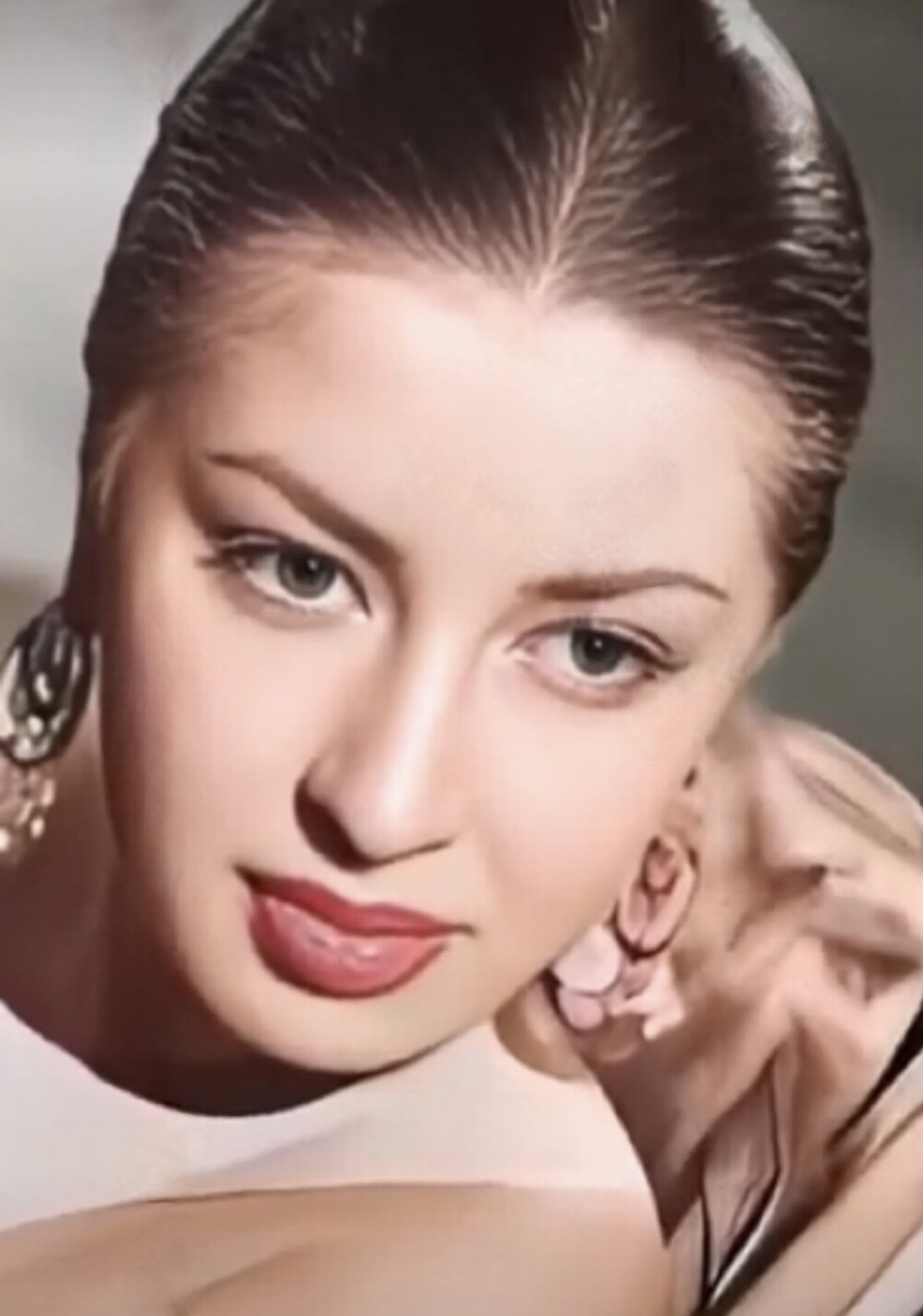
- Camelia in 1949
- Born: Lilian Victor Cohen; December 13, 1929; Alexandria, Kingdom of Egypt
- Died: August 31, 1950 (aged 20) near Itay El Barud, Kingdom of Egypt
- Occupation: Actress
- Years active: 1947–1950

Lilian Victor Cohen (Arabic: ليليان فيكتور كوهين; December 13, 1929 – August 31, 1950), known professionally as Camelia (كاميليا), was an Egyptian actress.

== Biography ==
Camelia was born in Alexandria to an Egyptian mother of Italian ancestry. There are several theories about her father ranging from a Greek Jewish merchant to a French diplomat. However, she had never confirmed who her real father was and insisted that she was a Christian despite having the surname Cohen. She was discovered by Egyptian director Ahmed Salem who cast her in her first film in 1946.

As a beautiful socialite in the high society of Alexandria, she loved partying. Events surrounding her and her high-society relationships frequently appeared in Arab tabloids. In particular, gossip surrounding her alleged relationship with King Farouk of Egypt.

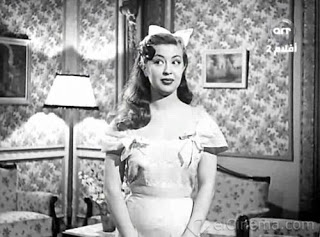
Camelia in the 1940s

Camelia was killed in the crash of TWA Flight 903 in 1950 when she was 30 years old. The accident added to the fame and mystery surrounding her image. Her wild lifestyle and tragic death are often compared to that of Marilyn Monroe. Conspiracy theories and speculation about espionage, especially in the context of Israel were also widespread in Egypt, but nothing has ever been proven. Despite a short career, she gained a place in the memory of Egyptian and Arab audiences and left a mark in the films that are still shown all over the Arab world. Famed Egyptian director Atef Salem based his film Hafeya A'la Gesr El Zahab (Barefoot on a Golden Bridge) on her life.

== Selected films ==
- 1947: The Red Mask (El Qenaa el Ahmar)
- 1947: All Song (El Kol Yeghany)
- 1948: Temptation (Fitnah)
- 1948: A Woman's Imagination (Khayal Imra’ah)
- 1949: Dazed Souls (Arwah Haynnah)
- 1949: Such are Women (El Setat Kida)
- 1949: El Bahlawan Street (Shaare' el Bahlawan)
- 1949: The Penny Owner (Sahbet El Malalim)
- 1949: Midnight (Nos el Layl)
- 1949: My Own Child (Walady)
- 1949: The Female Murderer (El Qatelah)
- 1950: A Woman of Fire (Imra’ah men Nar)
- 1950: Dad Is Groom (Baba ‘Aris)
- 1950: Full Moon (Qamar Arba‘tachar)
- 1950: The Millionaire (El Millionair)
- 1950: Mind Is a Blessing (El ‘Aal Zenah)
- 1950: The Last Lie (Akher Kedbah)
- 1950: Cairo Road (El Tariq Ela el Qahirah) (final film role)
