= Ismail Yassine =

Egyptian actor (1912–1972)

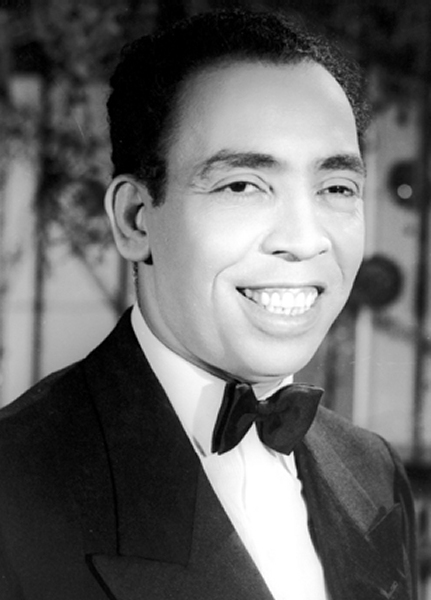
- Born: 15 September 1912; Suez, Kingdom of Egypt
- Died: 24 May 1972 (aged 59); Cairo, Egypt

Ismail Yassine (Arabic: إسماعيل ياسين IPA: [esmæˈʕiːl jæˈsiːn]; 15 September 1912 – 24 May 1972) was an Egyptian actor. He was known for his slapstick comedy films that has been compared to Charlie Chaplin. He began his acting career in 1939 with the film Khalaf El-Habayeb (1939; Arabic: خلاف الحبيب, romanized: The Son of the Dears).

== Life ==
Ismail Yassin was born on September 15, 1912. He was the only son of a prosperous jeweler on Abbas Street in the city of Suez. His mother died when he was still a young child.

Ismail attended a local elementary school up to the fourth grade. However, when his father's jewelry business went bankrupt due to financial mismanagement, and his father was imprisoned due to mounting debts, the young boy had to work as a street crier in front of a fabric store. He had to take on responsibilities from a very young age. Eventually, he had to leave home out of fear of his father's wife's mistreatment and began working as a car crier at one of the parking lots in Suez.

Ismail Yassine was married three times, but he had only one son, the late director Yassin Ismail Yassine, from his last wife, Mrs. Fawzia.

== Career ==
Ismail Yassin had a deep affection for the songs of the composer Mohammed Abdel Wahab, which he had been singing since his early childhood. He dreamt of becoming a competitive singer like him.

He later moved to Cairo in the early 1930s to pursue his artistic career as a singer. However, his appearance and light-heartedness prevented him from succeeding in singing. Ismail possessed the qualities that made him a star among entertainers as he was a singer, monologist, and actor. He remained one of the pioneers in this art form for a decade, from 1935 to 1945. Later, he ventured into cinema, and films were produced under his name after films were made under Leila Murad's name. Among these films are (Ismail Yassine in the Wax Museum - Ismail Yassine Meets Raya and Sakina - Ismail Yassine in the Army - Ismail Yassine, the Military Policeman (film) - Ismail Yassine in Aviation - Ismail Yassine in the Navy - Ismail Yassine in the Mental Hospital, and so on).

=== From Suez to Cairo ===
When he reached the age of 17, he headed to Cairo in the early 1930s, where he worked as a waiter in one of the cafes on Mohamed Ali Street and stayed in small popular hotels. He later joined the work of the famous "Nawassa," who was one of the most well-known folk dancers at the time. As he couldn't make enough money, he left her to work as an agent in a lawyer's office to make a living.

Then, he reconsidered pursuing his artistic dream and went to Bade'ah Musabni, after he discovered his artistic twin and lifelong friend and partner in his artistic journey, the great comedy writer Abu Al-Saud Al-Ibiary. They formed a famous artistic Duet, and he was his partner in Bade'ah Musabni's nightclub and later in cinema and theater. Abu Al-Saud Al-Ibiary recommended him to Bade'ah Musabni for hiring in her troupe. He joined her troupe and performed monologues at Bade'ah Musabni's nightclub.

Ismail Yassin succeeded in the art of monologue and remained brilliant in this field for ten years from 1935 to 1945, even earning four pounds for each monologue on the radio, including the fees for writing and composing. His twin artistic partner, Abu Al-Saud Al-Ibiary, was always the one who wrote these monologues.

=== Cinema ===
In 1939, he began his entry into the world of cinema when Fouad El-Jazairli chose him to participate in the film "Khalf Al-Habayeb" (Behind the Loved Ones). He appeared in many films during that period, often in supporting roles. Among the most famous were "Ali Baba and the Forty Thieves," "Nour Al-Din and the Three Sailors," and "Al-Qalb Lahu Wahid" (The Heart Has One). Ismail Yassin appeared in more than 166 films during his lifetime.

=== The lone protagonist of the movie ===
In 1944, Ismail Yassin's talent caught the attention of Anwar Wagdi, who frequently cast him in his films. Then, in 1949, he was given his first leading role in the film "Al-Nasih" (The Adviser), alongside the rising star, Magda.

Yassin managed to become a box office sensation, attracting hordes of fans. The years 1952, 1953, and 1954 were his golden era when he starred in 16 films in a single year, a record no other artist could achieve.

Ismail Yassin captivated audiences by acknowledging his own appearance and prominent mouth in most of his works. This charm propelled him to the forefront, securing him a prominent position and leading producers to sign him for new films, making him the sole hero whose name was associated with films, ultimately reaching the pinnacle.

In 1954, he played a significant role in shaping the history of Egyptian comedy theater by establishing a troupe bearing his name, in partnership with his artistic twin and long-time collaborator, the author Abu Al-Saud Al-Ibiary. This troupe continued for 12 years until 1966, during which they performed more than 50 plays, nearly on a daily basis, all written by Abu Al-Saud Al-Ibiary.

=== A series of films under his name ===
Starting in 1955, he and his artistic twin, Abu Al-Saud Al-Ibiary, along with the director Fatin Abdel Wahab, formed one of the most important trios in the history of Egyptian cinema and in the careers of both Ismail Yassin and Abu Al-Saud Al-Ibiary. They worked together in several films.

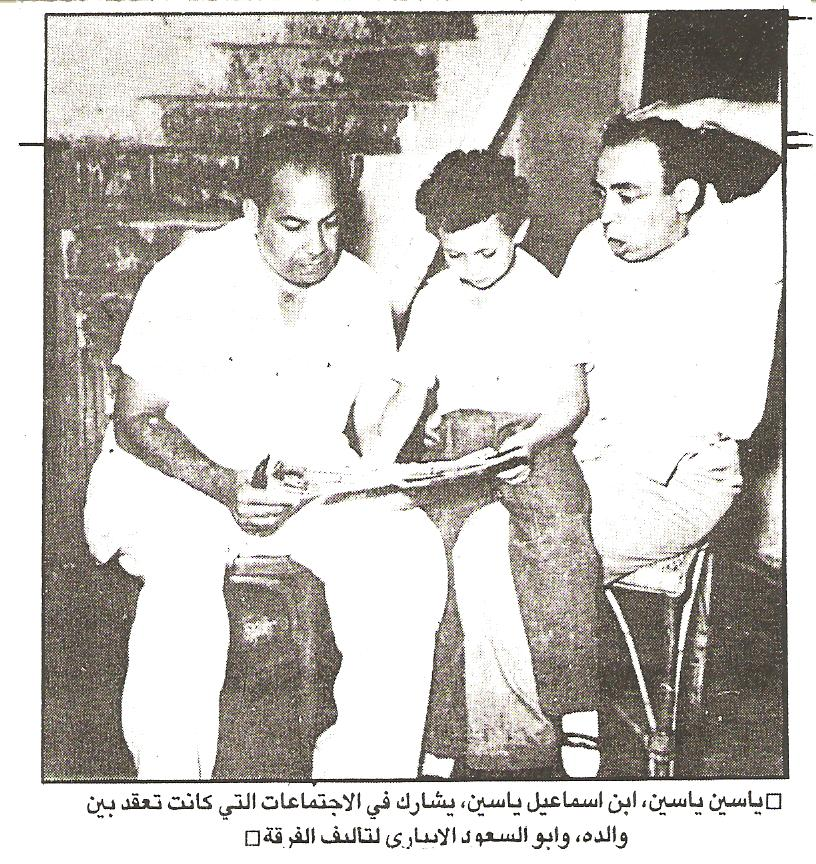
Yassin, his son Yassin and Abo El Seoud El Ebiary

It is worth mentioning that 30% of the films presented by the comedy star were directed by Fatin Abdel Wahab, most of which bore the name Ismail Yassin. These films were produced under his name after Leila Mourad. Among these films are Ismail Yassin in the Wax Museum - Ismail Yassin Meets Raya and Sakina - Ismail Yassin in the Army - Ismail Yassin in the Police - Ismail Yassin in Aviation - Ismail Yassine in the Navy - Ismail Yassin in the Mental Hospital - Ismail Yassin Tarzan - Ismail Yassin for Sale, most of which were written by Abu Al-Saud Al-Ibiary.

In these films, he was accompanied by the actor Riad al-Qasabgi, famous for his role as Shawish Atiya, where their scenes - even to this day - remain an important milestone in the history of comedy. Audiences still enjoy them due to the fantastic coincidences, natural situations, and pranks they devised for each other. Abd al-Salam al-Nabulsi also joined them in acting in some of these films.

== Filmography ==
- 1948 Khulood (Arabic: خلود)
- 1949 Little Miss Devil (Arabic: عفريتة هانم)
- 1950 The Millionaire (Arabic: المليونير, romanized: El Millioner)
- 1953 Dahab (Arabic: دهب, romanized: gold)
- 1954 Miss Hanafi (Arabic: آنسه حنفي)
- 1957 Hamido's Son (Arabic: ابن حميدو, romanized: Ibn Hamido)
- 1957 Ismail Yassine in the Navy (Arabic: إسماعيل يس في الأسطول, romanized: Ismail Yassine fi El Ostool)
- 1962 The King of Oil (Arabic: ملك البترول, romanized: The King of Oil)
- 1963 The Crazy Ones in Paradise (Arabic: المجانين فى نعيم, romanized: The Crazy Ones in Paradise)
- 1965 The Mind and the Money (Arabic: العقل والمال (فيلم), romanized: The Mind and the Money)

== See also ==
- List of Egyptian films of the 1940s
- List of Egyptian films of the 1950s
- List of Egyptian films of the 1960s
- List of some of the notable Egyptians
