= Abbas Fares =

Egyptian actor (1902–1978)

Abbas Fares عباس فارس
- Born: 22 April 1902; Egypt
- Died: 13 February 1978 (aged 75); Cairo, Egypt
- Occupation: Actor
- Years active: 1929-1971

ʻAbbās Fāres (Arabic: عباس فارس; 22 April 1902 – 13 February 1978) was an Egyptian film actor. He appeared in 26 films between 1929 and 1971.

== Selected filmography ==
- Nashid al-Amal (1937)
- The Will (1939)
- Dananeer (1940)
- Aydah (1942)
- Les Misérables (1944)
- A Night of Love (1951)
- Furigat (1951)
- The Monster (1954)
- The Poor Millionaire (1959)
- Qays wa layla (1960)
- Watch Out for ZouZou (1972)
- In Desert and Wilderness (1973)
