= Little Miss Devil =

Little Miss Devil Afrita hanem
- Arabic: عفريتة هانم
- Directed by: Henry Barakat
- Written by: Abo El Seoud El Ebiary
- Produced by: Farid Al Atrache
- Starring: Samia Gamal; Farid Al Atrache; Lola Sedki; Ismail Yassine
- Cinematography: Ahmed Adley
- Edited by: Emile Bahri
- Music by: Farid Al Atrache
- Release date: 1949
- Running time: 112 minutes
- Country: Egypt
- Language: Arabic

Little Miss Devil (Arabic: عفريتة هانم, romanized: Afrita hanem, lit. 'Little Miss Genie') is a 1949 Egyptian musical comedy film directed by Henry Barakat. The plot is about Asfour, a poor singer, played by Syrian musician Farid Al Atrache, who falls in love with Aleya, the somewhat spoiled daughter of his boss.

== Plot ==
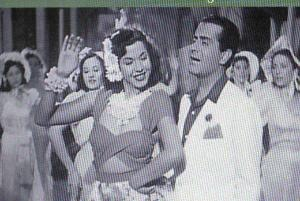
Samia Gamal and Farid Al-Attrach

Asfour wants to marry Aleya, but her father won't let the marriage happen due to Asfour's class status. Asfour turns to a genie for help, but the genie, a female genie named Kahramana, played by noted Egyptian actress and dancer Samia Gamal, falls in love with Asfour instead, and tries to manipulate his desires.

== Release ==
Following the publicity of Gamal's marriage to Texan Shepherd King in 1951, the film became the first Egyptian film to receive a regular theatrical release in the United States, opening December 7, 1951 in New York City. The New York state censor reportedly deleted one dance scene that had a close up of Gamal's lower abdomen.

== Reception ==
According to the British Film Institute’s book 100 Film Musicals, Afrita hanem critiques modernity: “Running through all these films (as through so many Indian films), exploring moral dilemmas in bourgeois family settings, is a discourse in which western modernity – cars, clothes, manners – is viewed negatively in relation to traditional values. The sage who presides over the genie in Afrita Hanem pops up from time to time to deliver homilies about materialistic greed and selfishness.”

Variety felt that Gamal showed "scant thespic ability. Her talent appears to be exclusively confined to a happy faculty of undulating her hips, abdomen and buttocks in an eye-arresting manner". They suggested that "the unitiated will find Arabic tunes as a form of monotonous wail devoid of melody."
