= Karem Mahmoud =

Egyptian singer and actor

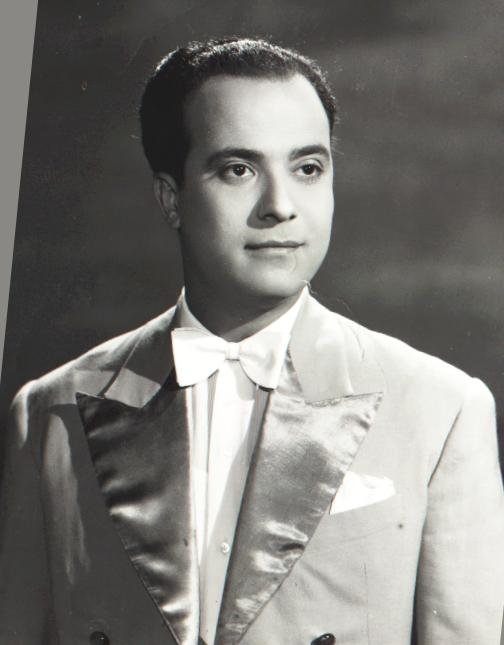
- Born: March 16, 1922; Damanhur
- Died: January 15, 1995 (aged 72); Saint Mary's Hospital, London
- Other name: Melodious Knight
- Occupation: Singer . actor
- Children: 2

Karem Mahmoud (Arabic: كارم محمود) (March 16, 1922 – January 15, 1995), also known as "the Melodious Knight", was a popular Egyptian singer and actor. He was also popular in the Arab world.

== Early life and career ==
Karem was born on March 16, 1922, in the city of Damanhur, el-Buhayrah Governorate, northern Egypt, not far from Alexandria.

As a child, Karem accompanied his elder brother Mohammed in singing religious verses, thereby developing his talent for singing Arabic poetry with precise pronunciation and phonetic discipline.

Even at elementary school, Karem's teachers noted his strong voice and by the time he was seven he had mastered the difficult songs of Sayed Darwish and Mohammed Abdel Wahab.

Despite his youth, Karem was admitted while still a child to the Institute of Arabic Music in Cairo. Karem was tutored by some of the greats of Egyptian music, including Fouad Mahfouz, Darwish el-Hariri, Sheikh Badawi, composer Safar Ali, and oudist Hassan Gharib.

In graduating from the Institute, he achieved the highest grades ever, with an unprecedented distinction.

Karem Mahmoud went on to become a star both as a singer and as an actor.

Karem died on January 15, 1995, in the intensive care unit of Saint Mary's Hospital in London. His last words were to his surgeon, prior to surgery: "Please guard my vocal cords throughout the surgery".

He was survived by his wife and two children.
