= Fatin Abdel Wahab =

Egyptian film director (1913–1972)

- فطين عبد الوهاب
- Born: 22 November 1913; Damietta, Egypt
- Died: 12 May 1972 (aged 58); Beirut, Lebanon
- Occupation: Film director
- Years active: 1949–1970
- Spouse: Leila Mourad (m. 1957; div. 1969)

Fatin Abdel Wahab (Arabic: فطين عبد الوهاب; 22 November 1913 – 12 May 1972) was an Egyptian film director. He directed 52 films between 1949 and 1970. His 1961 film Wife Number 13 was entered into the 12th Berlin International Film Festival. His 1965 film Driven from Paradise was entered into the 4th Moscow International Film Festival.

== Awards ==
It won the Lion’s Share award in the list of the 100 best comedies in Egyptian cinema, and the list included 17 works, based on the selection of the Alexandria Film Festival for the Red Sea Countries and the Egyptian Association of Film Writers and Critics.

== Filmography ==
- Al-Ustazah Fatimah (1952)
- Miss Hanafi (1954)
- Have a Good Day (1955)
- Ismail Yassine in the Navy (1957)
- Hamido's son (1957)
- Tahera (film) (1957) (Arabic: طاهرة)
- A Rumor of Love (1960)
- Wife Number 13 (1961)
- Bride of the Nile (1963)
- Driven from Paradise (1965)
- Three Thieves (1966)
- My Wife, the Director General (1966)
- My Wife's Dignity (1967)
- My Wife's Goblin (1968)
- Land of Hypocrisy (1968)

== See also ==
- Fatin Abdel Wahab at IMDb
