= Abo El Seoud El Ebiary =

Egyptian screenwriter

Abo El Seoud El Ebiary أبو السعود الإبياري
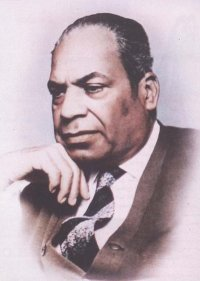
- A rare colored photo for Abo El Seoud El Ebiary
- Born: Abo El Seoud Ahmed Khalil El Ebiary; November 9, 1910; Cairo, Kingdom of Egypt
- Died: March 17, 1969 (aged 58); Cairo, Egypt
- Other names: Aboul Soud Ibiary, Abu Seoud El-Ibiary
- Occupation: Screenwriter - Playwright - Lyricist - Journalist
- Years active: 1930 - 1973
- Notable work: My Husband's Wife

Abo El Seoud El Ebiary (also credited as Aboul Soud Ibiary, Abu Seoud El-Ibiary; Arabic: أبو السعود الإبياري) (November 9, 1910 – March 17, 1969) was an Egyptian comic screenwriter, playwright, lyricist, and journalist.

He wrote for journalism in the 1950s in "Al Kawakeb" (or "The Planets") and "Ahl Al Fann" (or "People of Art") magazines entitled "Yawmeyat Abo El Seoud El Ebiary" (or "Abo El Seoud El Ebiary's Diaries"). Called many names such as the "Molière Al Sharq," the "Molière Of The East", the "Ostaz Al Comedia" or "The Comedy Professor", "Al Nahr Al Motadafeq" or "The Flowing River", "Joker Al Aflam" or "The Joker Of Movies", "Manjam Al Zahab" or "The Gold Astrologer", and "Al Gabal Al Dahek" or "The Comic Mountain".

El Ebiary wrote more than sixty-four comic plays too, most of them were starring the comedian Ismail Yasin, more than three hundred Arabic songs and more than five hundred Egyptian movies, which represents 17% of the history of the Egyptian and Arab cinema.

== Filmography ==
- Law Kont Ghani, (If I Were Rich), 1942.
- Amma Genan, (What A Lunacy), 1944.
- Share' Muhammad Ali, (Muhammad Ali Street), 1944.
- Ta'eiat Al Ikhfa', (The Disappearance Hat), 1944.
- Al Folous, (Money), 1945.
- Aheb Al Baladi, (I Love The Local), 1945.
- Raga', (An Arabic Feminine name means : Wish), 1945.
- Al Hob Al Awal, (The First Love), 1945.
- Al Gens Al Latif, (The Gentle Sex), 1945.
- Al Annesa Bosa, (Miss Kiss), 1945.
- Taxi Hantour, (A Cabriolet Taxi), 1945.
- Al Haz Al Sa'eed, (Good Luck), 1945.
- Sons of Adam (1945 film) (1945) (Arabic: البني آدم, romanized: Al-Bunni Adam)
- Al Qersh Al Abyad, (The White Coin), 1945.
- Awdet Ta'eiat Al Ikhfa', (The Return Of The Disappearance Hat), 1946.
- Al Ghani Al Maghoul, (The Unknown Rich Man), 1946.
- Rawia, (An Arabic feminine name means : Novelist), 1946.
- Ghani Harb, (War's Rich Man), 1947.
- Laiali Al Ons, (The Cordiality Nights), 1947.
- Qalbi Dalili, (My Heart Is My Guide), 1947.
- Soltanat Al Sahara', (The Sultana Of The Desert), 1947.
- Goz Al Itneen, (The Husband Of Both), 1947.
- Goha W Al Saba' Banat, (Goha And The Seven Girls), 1947.
- Al Sittat Afarit, (Women are Devils), 1948.
- Al Hawa W Al Shabab, (Love And Youth), 1948.
- Fouq Al Sahab, (Above The Clouds), 1948.
- Talaq Soad Hanem, (The Divorce Of Lady Soad), 1948.
- Al-Yateematain, (The Two Orphans), 1948.
- Halawa, (An Arabic manly name means: Sweet), 1949.
- Ala Qad Lehafak, (Into Your Quilt), 1949.
- Mabrouk Aliki, (Congratulations To You), 1949.
- Sitt al-Bayt, (Lady of the House), 1949.
- Fatma, Mareeka & Rachel, (Three feminine names: a Muslim, a Christian and a Jew) 1949.
- Ser Al Amirah, (The Princess Secret), 1949.
- Oqbal Al Bakari, (Wish The Same For The Virgins), 1949.
- Afrita Hanem, (Lady Ghost) 1949.
- Aseer Al Oyoun, (The Eyes' Captive), 1949.
- Laylat Al Eid, (The Feast Night), 1949.
- Ah Men Al Rigala, (Oh! From Men), 1950.
- Al Batal, (The Hero), 1950.
- Al Annesa Mama, (Miss Mama), 1950.
- Sa'a Le Qalbak, (An Hour For Your Heart), 1950.
- Bent Paris, (The Girl from Paris), 1950.
- Al Zawga Al Sabe'a, (The Seventh Wife), 1950.
- Ma'lesh Ya Zahr, (Hard Luck, Dice), 1950.
- Afrah, (An Arabic feminine name means : Delights), 1950.
- Zalamouni Al Nas, (People Oppressed Me), 1950.
- Seebouni Aghani, (Let Me Sing), 1950.
- Al Millionaire, (The Millionaire), 1950.
- Akher Kedba, (The Last Lie), 1950.
- Yasmin, (An Arabic Feminine name means: Jasmine), 1950.
- Set Al Hosn, (The Pretty Lady), 1950.
- Akhlaq Lel Bae', (Virtue for Sale), 1950.
- Balad Al Mahboub, (The Country Of The Beloved), 1951.
- Laylat Al Hinna, (The Henna Night), 1951.
- Habibati Sousou, (My Lovely Sousou), 1951.
- Foregat, (It Has Been Relieved), 1951.
- Al Banat Sharbat, (Girls Are Sherbet), 1951.
- Ta'ala Sallem, (Come and Greet), 1951.
- Hamati Konbella Zeria, (My Mother-in-Law is a Nuclear Bomb), 1951.
- Habib Al Rouh, (The Love Of Soul), 1951.
- Furigat, 1951
- Fayeq W Rayeq, (Two Arabic manly names means : Wakeful & Clear), 1951.
- Qatr Al Nada, (An Arabic feminine name means : Drops of dew), 1951.
- Mate'olsh Le Had, (Don't Tell Anyone), 1952.
- Al Hawa Maloush Dawa, (No Medicine For Love), 1952.
- Ala Keifak, (As You Like), 1952.
- Musmar Goha, (Goha's Nail), 1952.
- Ayza Atgawez, (I Want To Marry), 1952.
- Qadam Al Khair, (The Foot Of Welfare), 1952.
- Ya Halawat Al Hob, (What Sweet Love Is), 1952.
- Ganna W Nar, (Heaven And Hell), 1952.
- Ana Wahdi, (I Am Alone), 1952.
- Hazzak Haza Al Osbou', (Your Luck This Week), 1953.
- Laila Bent Al Akaber, (Laila, The Daughter Of The Nobles), 1953.
- Afreet Am Abdou, (Uncle Abdou's Ghost), 1953.
- Nashala Hanem (Lady Pickpocket), 1953.
- Fa'el Khair (Philanthropist), 1953.
- Dahab, (An Arabic feminine name means : Gold), 1953.
- Ishhadou Ya Nas, (Deposit, People), 1953.
- Ibn Lel Igar, (A Son For Rent), 1953.
- Ibn Zawat, (Son Of Nobles), 1953.
- Lahen Hobby, (My Love's Melody), 1953.
- Al Hamawat Al Fatenat (Charming Mothers-in-Law), 1953.
- Million Geneh,(A Million Of Pounds), 1953.
- Taxi Al Gharam, (The Taxi OF Love), 1954.
- Banat Hawa', (Daughters Of Eve), 1954.
- Al Omr Wahed, (Lifetime Is One), 1954.
- Arba' Banat W Zabet, (Four Girls And An Officer), 1954.
- Sharaf Al Bent, (Girl's Honor), 1954.
- Afreetet Ismail Yasin, (Ismail Yasin's Female Ghost), 1954.
- Al Zolm Haram, (Injustice Is Prohibited), 1954.
- Ilha'ouni Bel Ma'zoun, (Get For Me A Marriage Official), 1954.
- Al Ostaz Sharaf, (An Arabic manly name means : Mr. Honesty), 1954.
- Aziza, (An Arabic feminine name means : Precious), 1954.
- Insan Ghalban, (An Humble Man), 1954.
- Araies Fi Al Mazad, (Brides In Auction), 1955.
- Mamlaket Al Nisa', (Kingdom Of Women), 1955.
- Ismail Yasin Yoqabel Rayya W Sakina, (Ismail Yasin Meets Rayya & Sakina), 1955.
- Sahebat Al Ismah, (The Lady Infallibility Owner), 1955.
- Laiali Al Hob, (Nights of Love), 1955.
- Ismail Yasin Fe Al Gueish, (Ismail Yasin Joins The Army), 1955.
- Al Armala Al Taroub, (The Joyful Widow), 1956.
- Al Mofatesh Al Aam, (The General Inspector), 1956.
- Anta Habibi, (You're My Beloved), also known as (My One And Only Love), 1957.
- Ismail Yasin Fi Genenat Al Haiawanat, (Ismail Yasin In The Zoo), 1957.
- Fata Ahlami, (Young Man Of My Dreams), 1957.
- Ismail Yasin Fi Demesheq, (Ismail Yasin In Damascus), 1958.
- Ismail Yasin Tarazan, (Ismail Yasin Tarazan), 1958.
- Al Set Nawa'em, (Lady Nawa'em), 1958.
- Ayami Al Sa'eedah, (My Happy Days), 1958.
- Kol Daqqa Fi Qalbi, (Every Beat Of My Heart), 1959.
- Al Millionaire Al Faqir, (The Poor Millionaire), 1959.
- Ismail Yasin Fi Al Tayaran, (Ismail Yasin Joins The Air Force), 1959.
- Hassan W Marika, (Hassan & Marika), 1959.
- Hallak Al Sayedat, (Ladies Hairdresser), 1960.
- Al Fanous Al Sehry, (The Magic Lamp), 1960.
- Sokkar Hanem, (Lady Sugar), 1960.
- Hob W Azab, (Love And Torture), 1961.
- Malek Al Petrol, (The King Of Petroleum), 1962.
- Al Zawga 13, (Wife Number 13), 1962.
- Al Forsan Al Thalathah, (The Three Musketeers), 1962.
- Qadi Al Gharam, (The Judge Of Love), 1962.
- Al Maganeen Fi Na'eem, (Lunatics Are In Heaven), 1963.
- Al Arees Yassel Ghadan, (The Groom Arrives Tomorrow), 1963.
- Hareb Men Al Zawag, (Runaway From Marriage), 1964.
- Sagheera Ala Al Hob, (Too Young for Love), 1966.
- Ganab Al Safir, (His Excellency The Ambassador), 1966.
- Shaqet Al Talabah, (The Students Apartment), 1967.
- Al Arees Al Thani, (The Second Groom), 1967.
- Shabab Magnoun Geddan, (Very Crazy Youth), 1967.
- Al Ragol Al Monaseb, (The Suitable Man), 1967.
- Hawa' W Al Qerd, (Eve and The Monkey), 1968.
- Arees Bent Al Wazir, (The Groom Of The Minister's Daughter), 1970.
- Zawga Le Khamsat Regal, (One Wife For Five Men), 1970.
- Imra'at Zawgi, (My Husband's Wife), 1970.
- Shaqah Mafroushah, (A Furnished Apartment), 1970.
- Al Bahth An Fadihah, (Looking For A Scandal), 1973.

== Plays ==
- Habibi Coco, (My Lovely, Coco)
- Arees Tahet Al Tamreen, (A Trainee Groom)
- Al Set Ayzah Keda, (The Lady Wants That)
- Sahebat Al Jalalah, (Her Majesty)
- Min Kol Beit Hekayah, (A Story From Each House)
- Khameis Al Hadi Ashar, (Khameis The Eleventh)
- Gouzy Beyekhteshy, (My Husband Ashamed)
- Sahra Fil Karakoun, (An Evening In The Police Station)
- Afreet Khatiby, (The Ghost Of My Fiance)
- Rokn Al Mara'a, (The Woman Corner)
- Al Korah Ma'a Bolbol, (The Ball Is With Bolbol)
- Ana Ayzah Millionaire, (I Want A Millionaire)
- Meraty Min Port Said, (My Wife Is From Port Said)
- Rohy Feek, (You're My Soulmate)
- Kol Al Rejalah Keda, (All Men Are Like That)
- Felous Wa Hob Wa Jawaz, (Money, Love And Marriage)
- Haramy Le Awal Marra, (A Thief For The First Time)
- Gouzy Kaddab, (My Husband Is A Liar)
- Emaret Bondoq, (Bondoq's Building)
- Meraty Qamar Sena'ei, (My Wife Is A Satellite)
- Kont Feen Embare7?, (Where Were You, Yesterday?)
- Ya Al Dafe' Ya Al Habs, (Pay Or Jail)
- Dameery Wakhed Ajazah, (My Conscience Is On Vacation)
- Leilet Dokhlety, (My Wedding Night)
- Azeb Ela Al Abad, (Single Forever)
- Al Hob Lamma Yefarqa', (Love When Explodes)
- Oqoul Al Settat, (Women Minds)
- Ya Qatel Ya Maqtoul, (Killer or Being Killed)
- Al Majaneen Fi Na'eem, (Lunatics Are In Heaven)
- Ametty Fatafeit Al Sokkar, (My Aunt, Sugar Crumbs)
- Munafeq Lel Ijar, (A Hypocrite For Rent)
- Sana Tanya Jawaz, (Second Grade In Marriage)
- Hamati Fi Al Television, (My Mother-In-Law Is On Television)
- Al Habib Al Madroub, (The Milled Beloved)
- Kannas Fi Garden City, (A Sweeper In Garden City)
- Talat Farkhat Wa Deek, (Three Hens And A Rooster)
- Alashan Khater Al Settat, (For The Sake Of Women)
- Etjawwazet Harami, (I've Married To A Thief)
- Hal Tuhebbeen Shalabi?, (Do You Love Shalabi?)
- Zoug Sa'eed Jeddan, (A Very Happy Husband)
- Bouhyaji Al Gharam, (The Love Polisher)
- Sayedetty Al Abeeta, (My Fool Lady)
- Hekayat Jawaza, (A Marriage Story)
- Safeer Hakabaka, (The Ambassador Of Hakabaka)
- Ana Wa Akhoya Wa Akhoya, (I, My Brother And My Brother)
- Bent Malek Al Sogoq, (The Sausage King Daughter)
