= Zeinat Sedki =

Egyptian actress and comedian

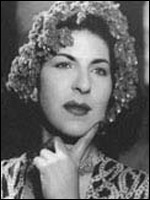
- Born: Zeinab Mohamed Mosaad; May 4, 1912; Alexandria, Egypt
- Died: March 2, 1978 (aged 65)
- Education: Ansar el Tamseel” (Acting Supporters) Institute
- Style: Comedy

Zeinat Sedki (May 4, 1912 - March 2, 1978) was an Egyptian actress and comedian. She was one of the female comedy pioneers in the Egyptian cinema along with Mary Mounib and Widad Hamdi.

== Biography ==
Zeinat Sedki was born Zeinab Mohamed Mosaad the May 4, 1912 in Alexandria, Egypt. She married a much older man at the age of 15 after her father forced her to drop out of school. She divorced a year later. after the death of her father, she began her career as a belly dancer, and joined an association of artists in the early 1930s. She ran away from home and joined a comedy theater troupe formed by Naguib el-Rihani where she performed a range of successful plays, among which was The Egyptian Pound (el Guineih el Masrî) in 1931. El-Rihani gave her the stage name Zeinat Sedki instead of her birth name Zeinab Mohamed Saad.

She made her film debut in 1934 film by Mario Volpe The Accusation. she credited her breakthrough to the movie “His Highness Wants to Marry” (1936). In this film, she plays the role of a maid of rural origin. She will later resume the same role on the boards in a theatrical adaptation written by Naguib el-Rihani and Badie Khairy. At the end of her career, she started having financial problems and started to sell her furniture in order to cover her expenses. In 1976, former Egyptian President Mohamed Anwar el-Sadat gave her an award at The Art Feast and granted her an exceptional pension.

== Filmography ==
- 1934 : Al-ittihâm [ The Accusation ], film by Mario Volpe.
- 1936 : Bisalamtouh ‘âwiz yitgawwiz [ Monsieur wants to get married ], film by Alexandre Farkache.
- 1944: Berlanti [ Berlanti ], film by Youssef Wahbi.
- 1949 : ’Ifrîtah hânim [ Madam the Devil ], film by Henry Barakat.
- 1950 : al-Batal [ The Hero ], film by Helmy Rafla.
- 1950 : al-Millionnaire [ The Millionaire ], film by Helmy Rafla.
- 1952 : The Sweetness of Love
- 1953 : Zalamounî al-habâyib [ Those I love have wronged me ], film by Helmy Rafla.
- 1953 : Maw’id ma’ al-hayâh [ Rendezvous with life ], film by Ezz El-Dine Zulficar.
- 1953 : Dahab, film d’Anwar Wagdi.
- 1954 : Qouloub al-nâs [ Human hearts ], film by Hassan el-Imam.
- 1954 : al-Ânissah Hanafi [ Miss Hanafi ], film by Fatin Abdel Wahab.
- 1954 : al Malâk al-zâlim [ The Unjust Angel ], film by Hassan El-Imam.
- 1954 : Innîh râhilah [ I'm leaving ], film by Ezz El-Dine Zulficar.
- 1955 : Madrasat al-banât [ The School for Girls ], film by Kamel el-Telmissany.
- 1956: Al-Qalb louh ahkâm [ The heart has its reasons ], film by Helmy Halim.
- 1957 : Ibn Hamido [ Hamido's son ], film by Fatin Abdel Wahab.
- 1958 : Châri’ al-houbb [ The Street of Love ] film by Ezz El-Dine Zulficar.
- 1960 : Hallâq al-sayyidât [ Hairdresser for ladies ], film by Fatin Abdel Wahab.
- 1962: Gamâeyat Qatl al-Zawgât al-Hazleya [The Comic Society for Killing Wives], film by Hasan El-Saifi.
- 1975 : Bint ismouhâ Mahmoud [ A girl called Mahmoud ], film by Niazi Mostafa.
