= Abdel Salam Al Nabulsy =

Lebanese actor of Palestinian origin

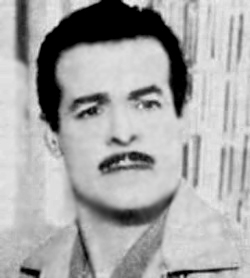
- Born: Abdel Salam Al Nabulsy; August 23, 1899; Tripoli, Lebanon
- Died: July 5, 1968 (aged 68); Beirut, Lebanon
- Other names: Conte De Nablus
- Occupation: Actor
- Years active: 1929–1968
- Known for: Egyptian films
- Partner: Georgette Thabet

Abdel Salam Al Nabulsy (Arabic: عبد السلام النابلسي) (23 August 1899 – 5 July 1968) was a Lebanese actor of Palestinian origin.

== Life ==
Nabulsy was born in Tripoli, Lebanon, in 1899, and died 1968 in Beirut. He is known for Egyptian movies in which he co-starred with renowned actors like Ismail Yasin, Abdel Halim Hafez, Faten Hamama and Farid El Atrash

Nabulsy studied in Egypt at Al-Azhar University. While there, he developed an interest in acting. He acted on stage for a while and when his family got wind of his new career, they stopped sending him money so that he may focus instead on his studies. Acting afforded Nabulsy a way to earn a living. While he portrayed some evil if not too violent characters, his filmography was generally characterized by comedic roles.

He died in Beirut in 1968.

== Filmography ==
- Yom min omri (1961)
- Ashour kalb el assad (1961)
- Ahlam al banat (1960)
- Bayn el samaa wa el ard (1960)
- Itharissi minal hub (1960)
- Hekayat hub (1959)
- Ismail Yassine bolis harbi (1959)
- Sharia el hub (1959)
- Fata ahlami (1957)
- Ard el salam (1957)
- El-Kalb Loh Ahkam (1957)
- Wadda'tu hubbak (1957)
- Hub wa insania (1956)
- Mogezat el samaa (1956)
- N'harak said (1955)
- Bahr algharam (1955)
- El Ard el Tayeba (1954)
- El Mohtal (1954)
- Ayza atgawwez (1952)
- Ma takulshi la hada (1952)
- Taa la salim (1951)
- Akher kedba (1950)
- Afrita hanem (1949)
- Ahebbak inta (1949)
- Berlanti (1944)
- El Warsha (1941)
- The Will (1939)
- Ghadat al-sahara (1929)
