= Widad Hamdi =

Egyptian actress (1924–1994)

Wedad Hamdi
- وداد حمدي
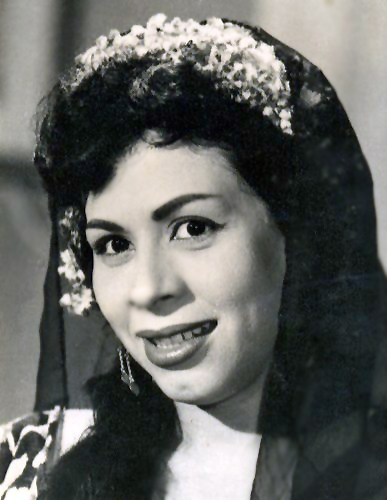
- Born: Wedad Mehammad Elsawi Zaraarah; 7 March 1924; Kafr El-Sheikh, Egypt
- Died: 26 March 1994 (aged 70); Venus Building, Ramses Square, Cairo, Egypt
- Cause of death: Stabbing
- Occupation: Actress
- Years active: 1945–1994
- Spouses: Mehammad Elmogi; Salah Kabil; Mehammad Eltukhi

Wedad Hamdi (Note: Sometimes listed as "Wedad Hamdi") (Arabic: وداد حمدي) was an Egyptian actress. She starred in over 600 films during her lifetime, and almost all her roles were as a servant or maid.

== Early life ==
Wedad Mehammad Elsawi Zaraarah was born on 7 March 1924 in Kafr El-Sheikh. She studied at the Acting Institute and graduated after two years. Hamdi started her career as a singer.

== Career ==
Hamdi's first film was Henry Barakat's This Was My Father's Crime (1945).

She worked with the Egyptian National Troupe on several plays. Hamdi retired in the sixties but was called out of retirement to work on the play Tamr Henna.

== Personal life ==
Hamdi was married two times, to composer Muhammad al-Mougy and actor Muhammad al-Toukhy.

== Murder ==
Hamdi was stabbed 35 times in the neck, chest, and abdomen. Her killer was convicted and later executed. She died with very little money to her name.

== Selected filmography ==
=== Film ===
- This Was My Father's Crime (1945)
- Bread and Salt (1949)
- The Love Office (1950)
- A Million Pounds (1954)
- Miss Hanafi (1954)
- Fatawat el Husseinia (1955)
- The Female Boss (1959)
- Forbidden Women (1959)
- Hassan and Nayima (1959)
- Love and Adoration (1960)
- A Storm of Love (1961)
- Wife Number 13 (1962)
- Soft Hands (1963)
- In Summer We Must Love (1974)
- Whom Should We Shoot? (1975)
- Mouths and Rabbits (1977)
- Min Fadlik Wa Ihsanik (1986)
- My Dear, We’re All Thieves (1989)

=== Television ===
- The Return of the Spirit (1977)

=== Plays ===
- Azeeza and Younis (Azeeza W Younis)
- 20 Hens and a Rooster (20 farkha we deek)
- A Game Called Love (L’eba esmaha al-hobb)
- Mother of Rateeba (Om-Rateeba)

== See also ==
- Cinema of Egypt
- Lists of Egyptian films
