= Husayn Fawzi Alnajjar =

Egyptian historian (1918–2003)

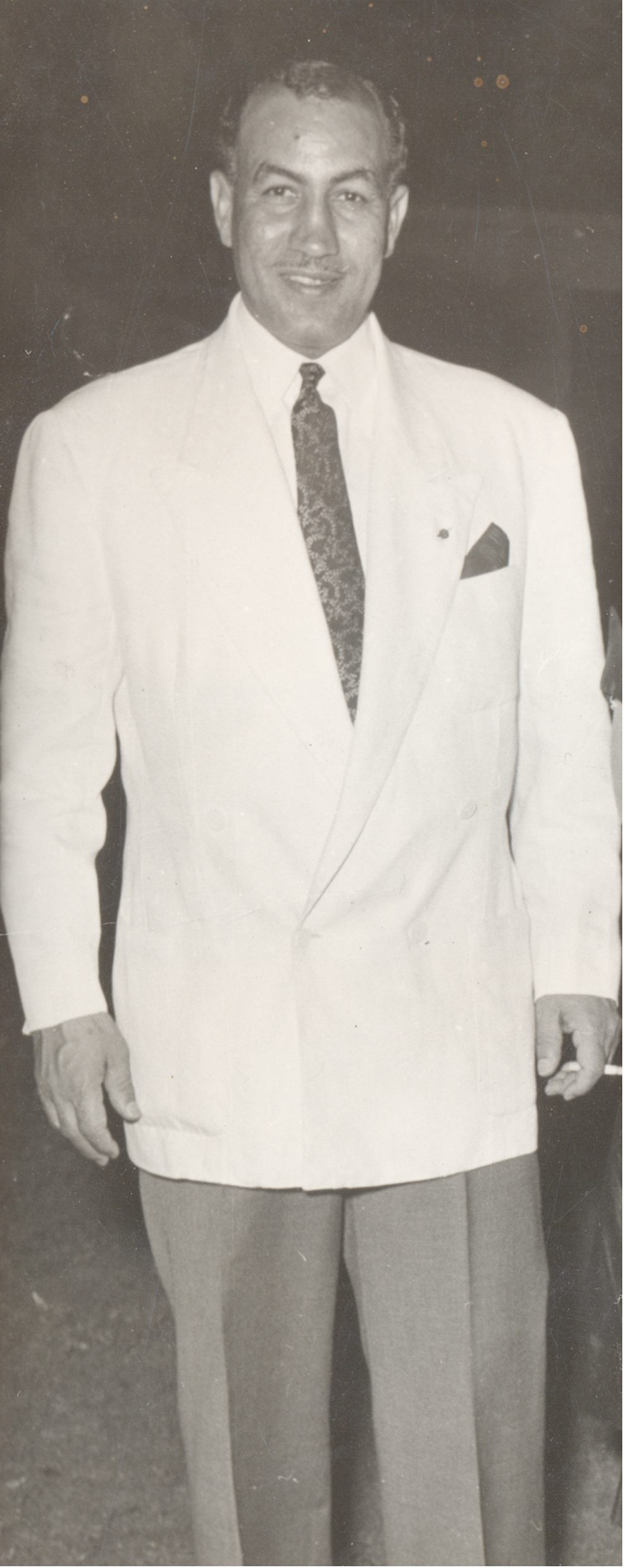
- Born: November 16, 1918
- Died: December 10, 2003 (aged 85)
- Occupations: Historian, political scientist, strategist, Islamic scholar

Husayn Fawzi Al-Najjar (Arabic: حسين فوزي النجار; November 16, 1918 – December 10, 2003) was an Egyptian historian, political scientist, strategist, and Islamic scholar. During his career, he published over 55 books on Middle Eastern history and politics.

== Career ==
Husayn Fawzi Al-Najjar graduated in 1940 from Fu'ād al-Awwal University (King Fuad I University, now Cairo University), where he majored in history. In the same year, he also graduated from the Royal Egyptian Military Academy reserve forces. His class was the first of the reserve forces to attain the rank of army officers. He attended the Institute of Journalism and the Institute of Education at the university.

In 1941, he began his career as an officer in the army and took an active part in World War II and the 1948 Arab–Israeli War. From 1950 to 1954, he taught Russian history at the Egyptian military academy. In 1952, he played an active role in the Egyptian coup. He became a leading figure in the field of Middle Eastern policy and strategy and lectured on those subjects in the Military Staff College until 1954 when he was appointed as an advisor in the Ministry of Education. From 1954 to 1961, he served in a diplomatic role, on the recommendation of defense minister Marshal Mohamed Ibrahim, on whose recommendation he also became head of media for the League of Arab States.

In 1957, Al-Najjar completed his doctorate in journalism at Cairo University with first-class honors. At the same time, he gained experience writing on historical matters for the newspaper Al-Jarida, which was founded by Ahmed Lutfi el-Sayed. He later wrote a biography of the teacher of a generation, Lutfi al-Sayyid Ustadh al-Jil, of whom he was a disciple, as well as of Muhammad Husayn Haykal, the latter recognizing in the young al-Najjar the makings of a great historian. Haykal had written the foreword to Al-Najjar's 1950 book Politics and strategy in the Middle East, which is considered a pioneering work. Al-Najjar was to become a leading figure in the field of policy and strategy in the Middle East and was a lecturer on these subjects at the Military Staff College until 1954. In 1958 he was awarded a post-doctoral fellowship at Harvard University in the field of political science.

== Post-retirement activities ==
Although he officially retired in 1973, Al Najjar carried on teaching at various institutions, including Cairo University and Al Azhar University. He was also a human rights advocate and the founding member of the first registered organization for human rights in Egypt, Jam`iyyat Ansar Huquq Al-Insan fi Misr. Alongside Tewfik Al-Hakim and Yusif Al Sebaie, he helped in founding the Writers' Union (Ittihad al Kuttab).

== Illness and death ==
From 1994 until his death in 2003, Al Najjar suffered from a debilitating illness that prevented him from continuing his scholarly work and activities.

== Publications ==
Al Najjar wrote over 55 books. Al Islam Wal Siyasah and Al Dawlah Wal Hukm Fi Al Islam critiqued the Islamic State concept. Lutfi AL Sayid Wal Shakhsiya al Misriya discusses his theory on Egyptian personality. His work on history and biographies include Al Tarikh Wal Siyar published by Al Maktaba Al Thakafiya (Cairo 1963).

He was also the author of Lutfi Al-Sayed, the Teacher of a Generation (Lutfi al-Sayyid Ustadh al-Jil), a biography of his teachers Ahmad Lutfi Al-Sayyid and Muhammad Husayn Haykal, the latter of whom recognized in the young Al-Najjar the makings of an outstanding historian. Indeed, Haykal wrote the introduction to Al Najjar's book Policy And Strategy In The Middle East (1950).

Other works include:

- Al Islam Wal Siyasah, published by Dar al Maarif, Cairo, 1977
- Al Dawlah Wal Hukm fi al Islam, published by Dar Al Huriyah, Cairo, 1985
- al Islam wa failsafe al hadarah, published by dar al taa Awon, Cairo, 1993
- Al Islam wal Dawalh al Asriyah, published by Al Haiy,a Al Misriya al Ama Lil Kitab Cairo, 1988
- Al Islam Wa Roh Al Asr, published by Dar al Maaref Liltebaa wal Nashr Cairo, 1979
- Policy and Strategy in the Middle East, published by Maktabet al Nahada al Misriyah, Cairo, 1953
- Al Arab Wal Urubah, published by Maktabet Al Anglo Al Misriyah, Cairo, 1984
- America Wal Alam, published by Maktabet Madbouli, Cairo, 1986
- Asharq al Arabi Bayn Harbayn, published by Al Dar Al Kawmia Lil Tibaa wal Nashr, Cairo, 1963
- Misr Fi al Muhit al Dawli, published by Ikhtarna liltalib series, Cairo, 1963
- Al Fikr Al Siyasi Al Hadith, published by Dar Al KATEB al Araabi 1967,مكان النشر والناشر: القاهرة:دار الكاتب العربي للطباعة والنشر

تاريخ النشر: 1967 لنجار حسين فوزي—الفكر السياسي الحديث—Cairo 1970

- Petrol Al Arab, published by Ikhtarnah Lil Taleb series, Cairo, 1960بترول العرب ( اخترنا للطالب )

بترول العرب ( اخترنا للطالب ) المؤلف: حسين فوزى النجارالناشر: كتب نادرة

- وحدة التاريخ العربي /Waḥdat al-tārīkh al-ʻArabīAuthorنجار، حسين فوزي. تأليف حسين فوزي النجار. ; Ḥusayn Fawzī Najjār

Publisher: مكتبة الأنجلو المصرية، [al-Qāhirah] : Maktabat al-Anjlū al-Miṣrīyah, 1964

- Ard al Miyad, published by Dar al Maaref, Cairo, 1958
- Wa,ad Balfor, published by Ikhtarnah Lil Taleb series, Cairo, 1960يتناول هذا الكتاب مضمون الخطاب الذي عرف بوعد بلفور
- Ma,a aAl Ahdath Fi Al Sharq Al Awsat 1946 TO 1956, published by Maktebet Al Kahira al Haditha, Cairo, 1957
- Thawraton fi al Taalim, published by Maktabet Al Nahda Al Misriya, Cairo,195
- Rifāʻah al-Ṭahṭāwī : rāʼid fikr wa-imām nahḍah, published by: al-Dār al-Miṣrīyah lil-Taʼlīf wa-al-Tarjamah, [1966]
- Aḥmad Luṭfī al-Sayyid : ustādh al-jīl 1965 الدار المصرية للتأليف والترجمة، [Cairo] : al-Dār al-Miṣrīyah lil-Taʼlīf wa-al-Tarjamah
- Luṭfī al-Sayyid wa-al-shakhṣīyah al-Miṣrīyah 1963[Cairo] : Maktabat al-Qāhirah al-Ḥadīthah
- Saʻd Zaghlūl : al-zaʻāmah wa-al-zaʻīm 1986[Cairo] : Maktabat Madbūlī
- Haykal wa-Ḥayāt Muḥammad, manhaj fī dirāsat al-tārīkh al-Islāmī 1965 al-Qāhirah : Maktabat al-Anglū al-Miṣrīyah
- al-Duktūr Haykal wa-tārīkh jīl, 1888-1956 [Cairo] : al-Hayʼah al-Miṣrīyah al-ʻĀmmah lil-Kitāb, 1988
- ʻAlī Mubārak : Abū al-taʻlīm,1967دار الكاتب العربي، al-Qāhirah : Dār al-Kātib al-ʻArabi 1967 دار الكاتب العربي، al-Qāhirah : Dār al-Kātib al-ʻArabī
- Mohamed Naguib Safhaton Men Tarikh Misr Al Muaser, published by Riyad Al Rayes, London, 1990
- Mustafa Kamel Ra,ed Al Wataniya Haya AL Misriya lil Kitab, Cairo, 1994

=== Translated works ===
- Kadat Al Fikr al dawli fi al karn al ishreen by Kenneth Thomson published by Dar Al Marref 1980
- Anne Sullivan Mu.alimati by Helen Keller published by Dar al Maaref cairo 195? هيلين كيلر- ( معلمتي آن سوليفان) - ترجمة الدكتور.فوزي حسين النجار - دار المعرفة - القاهرة،
- Al Azhar Fi Alf Aam by Bayard Dodge published by Al Hayat al Misriya il Kitab Cairo 1994
- Salatu Al Hasm by Kenneth Galbraith آراء في السياسة والاقتصاد /ساعة الحسم / تأليف جون كنيث جلبرت ؛ ترجمة حسين فوزي النجار. بيانات النشر القاهرة : دار النهضة العربية،published by dar al nahda al arabiya Cairo 195

=== Filmography ===
- Furigat (1951)
- Heaven and Hell (1952)
