= List of Egyptian films of 1981 =

A list of films produced in Egypt in 1981. For an A-Z list of films currently on Wikipedia, see Category:Egyptian films.

Title	Director	Cast	Genre	Notes
Zeyara Serreya (Secret Visit)	Nagy Anglo	Salah Zulfikar, Athar El-Hakim, Mahmoud El-Meliguy	Drama	
Ana la Aktheb Walakenny Atagammal (I'm Not Lying But I'm Beautifying)	Ibrahim El-Shaqanqeeri	Salah Zulfikar, Ahmed Zaki, Athar El-Hakim	Drama	
Ahl El Qemma (People on the Top)	Ali Badrakhan	Soad Hosny, Nour El Sherif, Ezzat El Alili	Drama	
Al-Ensan Yaeesh Mara Wahida (A Man Lives Once)	Simon Saleh	Adel Emam, Yousra	Drama	
Al Shaytan yaez				
Al-Mashbouh (The Suspect)	Samir Seif	Soad Hosny, Adel Emam	Drama / thriller	
Lahzet Da’af (A Moment of Weakness)	Sayed Tantawy	Salah Zulfikar, Nelly, Hussein Fahmy	Drama	
Intakhebo El-Doctor Sulieman Abdel Basset (Vote for Dr. Seliman Abdel-Basset)	Mohamed Abdel Aziz	Adel Emam, Madiha Kamel, Soheir El-Bably, Omar El-Hariri	Drama / crime	
Maowid ala ashaa (A Dinner Date)	Mohamed Khan	Soad Hosni, Ahmed Zaki, Hussein Fahmy	Drama / romance	
Ommahat Fi Al-Manfa (Mothers in Exile)	Mohamed Rady	Adel Emam, Isaad Younis, Eman, Amina Rizk, Magda El-Khatib, Ilham Chahine	Drama	
1982
