= Allahu Akbar (1959 film) =

- الله أكبر
- Directed by: Hossam El Din Mostafa
- Written by: Fouad El Tokhy (story, screenplay, and dialogue); Naguib Mahfouz (screenplay and dialogue)
- Starring: Zahrat El-Ola; Mohamed El Dafrawi; Abdel Waress Assar; Abdulaziz Khalil; Nemat Mokhtar; Shafik Galal; Hassan Hamad
- Cinematography: Mohamed Taha]
- Edited by: Kamal Abul Ela (chief editor); Fikri Rostom (editor); Marcel Saleh (negative)
- Music by: Hussein Junaid
- Production company: Nefertiti Films
- Release date: March 23, 1959
- Running time: 80 minutes
- Country: Egypt
- Language: Arabic

Allahu Akbar (Arabic: الله أكبر, lit. “God Is Great”) is an Egyptian film released in 1959, directed by Hossam El Din Mostafa featuring a story and dialogue by Fouad El Tokhy and a screenplay by Naguib Mahfouz. The film stars Zahrat El-Ola, Mohamed El Dafrawi, and Abdel Waress Assar. The protagonist is Hind, a girl from a devout Muslim family, who is tormented by the tribe of her unrequited lover from the Banu Amir tribe, who worship idols in the early days of the faith.

== Cast ==
=== Main cast ===
- Zahrat El-Ola (Hind, a girl from the Banu al-Harith tribe)
- Mohamed El Dafrawi (Nu’man, son of the chief of the Banu Amir)
- Abdel Waress Assar (Amr ibn Sa`id, chief merchant of the Banu al-Harith)
- Abdulaziz Khalil (chief of the Banu Amir)
- Hassan Hamad (Sakhr, another son of the Banu Amir chief)
- Kawther Ramzi (Jawhara, Hind's maidservant)
- Naamat Sami (Salma, Amr ibn Sa’id's wife)

=== Supporting cast ===
- Sayed al-Rayes
- Awatef Ramadan
- Nemat Mokhtar
- Shafik Galal
- Hussein Issa
- Mohsen Hassanein
- Nadia Ali
- Samira Hussein
- Fouad Said
- Hussein Al-Meliguy
- Ali Kamel
- Abdel Mona'em Saoudi
- Kamel Al-Sawy
- ʻAbd al-Qādir Ḥusayn
- Toson Moatamed
- Abdul Hamid Badawi
- Khaled El Agabany
- Zine El Abidine Salem
- Abdul Hamid Al Husseini
- Ismail Rizk
- Ibrahim Fawzy

== Synopsis ==
Nu’man (Mohamed El Dafrawi), the son of a sheikh of the Banu Amir tribe, falls in love with Hind (Zahrat El-Ola), granddaughter of Amr ibn Sa`id (Abdel Waress Assar), the chief merchant of the Banu al-Harith tribe. They meet when Nu’man, a fāris or knight, is riding and encounters Hind almost getting bucked off her horse. The two agree to meet by a brook, but her convoy is stopped by knights led by Sakhr (Hassan Hamad), who demand tribute. “Prince” Nu’man intercepts the knights and demands the convoy's passage, earning her growing affection.

Hind had left her father's home after his death and her mother's remarriage, and prefers to live with her grandfather Amr and grandmother Salma (Naamat Sami), who hire her maid Jawhara (Kawther Ramzi). Hind dresses in a tent and prays to the idol Al-Yabub, witnessed by a concerned Amr who dissuades Salma from scolding her. Soon, however, slaves of Nu’man and his father, the Banu Amir sheikh (Abdulaziz Khalil), convert to Islam and are killed with arrows. Hind discovers that her grandfather and his family have converted as well, but only when they reject Nu’man's marriage proposal due to his paganism. Soon the Banu al-Harith are subjected to killing and torture to force them back to their ancestral traditions.

== Songs ==
Songs in score
Title	Composer	Lyricist	Singer
هيا رجال البي (“Come On, Sturdy Men!”)	Hussein Junaid	Abdel Aziz Salam	Shafik Galal
تابلوه راقص (“Painted Dancer”)	Hussein Junaid		Nemat Mokhtar
الله أكبر (“God Is Great”)	Hussein Junaid	Abdel Aziz Salam	Karem Mahmoud

== Reception ==
Mohamed Metwally summarized it in an article in El Watan News as follows:

The film is a love story between a Muslim woman and a polytheist at the dawn of Islam, all from the pen of Naguib Mahfouz. It tells a complete love story without addressing the actual religious context directly, contrary to the fashion of the period, and herein laid its screenwriter’s downfall as a mass-media figure [thus encouraging his shift to literature]. Mahfouz’s film was an enormous commercial failure, doomed by a poorly attended premiere and a cast relatively devoid of marquee stars.
