= The Innocent (1986 film) =

1986 Egyptian film

- Directed by: Atef El Tayeb
- Written by: Wahid Hamed
- Starring: Ahmed Zaki; Gamil Ratib; Mahmoud Abdel Aziz; Mamdouh Abdel-Alim; Hassan Hosny
- Cinematography: Saeed Shimi
- Music by: Ammar El Sherei
- Release date: 11 August 1986
- Running time: 119 minutes
- Country: Egypt
- Language: Arabic

The Innocent (Arabic: البرئ, pronounced: Elbaree') is an Egyptian film, released in 1986, starring Ahmed Zaki, Gamil Ratib, and Mahmoud Abdel Aziz. It is written by Wahid Hamed and directed by Atef El Tayeb.

In 2005, Minister of Culture Farouk Hosny, in a rare move for the censorship-heavy region, agreed to show the movie uncut for the first time, 19 years after its production and release with heavy edits (including the removal of the controversial ending) demanded by the Ministers of Interior (Ahmed Rushdi), Defense (Abd Al-Halim Abu-Ghazala), and Culture (Ahmed Abdel Maqsoud Heikal) at the time. The 2005 screening was at the Cairo International Film Festival in honor of the then recently deceased Zaki. Both the songs in the film are sung and composed by Ammar El Sherei and feature lyrics by the poet Abdel Rahman el-Abnudi.

== Cast ==
- Ahmed Zaki (Ahmed Saba’a el-Leel)
- Mahmoud Abdel Aziz (Colonel Tawfiq Sharkas)
- Mamdouh Abdel-Alim (Hussein Wahdan)
- Elham Shahin (Nawara)
- Gamil Ratib (imprisoned geologist)
- Salah Qabil (Rashad Owais, an imprisoned writer)
- Hassan Hosny (officer)
- Ahmed Rateb (prisoner)
- Nahed Samir (Ahmed’s mother)
- Hosni Abdeljalil (Abu Bakr Bassiouni)
- Abdullah Hefni (Abd el-Sabour, Ahmed’s brother)
- Hassan al-Yamani (village sheikh)
- Ghareeb Mahmoud (mayor)
- Abdo Al Wazir (bus passenger)
- Samir Wahid
- Badr Nofal
- Shawqi Shamekh
- Aleya Abdel Moneim
- Waseela Hussein
- Abdelgawad Metwally
- Mahmoud Al Iraqi
- Samy Ataya
- Ahmed Abo Obeya
- Sami Kamel

== Plot ==
Ahmed Sabe' El Leil (Ahmed Zaki), a young, struggling farmer, is portrayed in the movie serving his conscription year. As a result of his marksmanship, he is chosen as a prison guard. At the prison, he encounters the political prisoners who are treated inhumanely. He follows orders to torture and humiliate the prisoners, and even perform executions. Trucks full of university students who participated in the 1977 bread riots are brought to this prison, among them is his old friend from the village, Hussein Wahdan. Through Hussein the young guard discovers how oppressive and corrupt the government is, and Ahmed refuses to torture Hussein. In the final scene, censored in Egypt, Ahmed opens fire indiscriminately on officers and fellow soldiers until he is shot as a new truck filled with rioting students arrives.

== Detailed summary ==
He lives with his mother and his intellectually disabled brother Abd al-Sabour. Ahmed knows nothing of the world outside his village, where his poverty has blocked him from obtaining an education. To him the nation is a simple concept, his sole homeland and country being his field and the canal in which he cools from the heat, while his enemies are those he can see, and his only entertainment is the grocer where the village youth gather to chatter and mock the gullible (including him). The only university-educated young man in the village, Hussein Wahdan (Mamdouh Abdel-Alim), sympathizes with Ahmed and prevents the other young men from taking their bullying too far, ultimately encouraging him to enlist in the armed forces.

When Ahmed is drafted, he does not understand what conscription means or where he is going, so Hussein explains that the army protects the country from the enemies of the nation, confusing Ahmed who asks “what enemies does our country [i.e. the village] have?” Later, the illiterate recruit is subjected to a medical examination as well as tests on cultural and scientific knowledge. Placing at the bottom of the class, he is assigned to guard an isolated detention center for political prisoners in the desert. There, he is trained to obey orders blindly even if counter to logic.

The prison warden is Colonel Tawfiq Sharkas (Mahmoud Abdel Aziz), an officer who lives a double life as a kind gentleman to his loved ones and a brutal torturer to his charges. Buying a Christmas gift for his daughter, he chooses a lovely guitar over action figures of a soldier and thief. He is magnanimous with a traffic cop who tickets his car for parking in a forbidden space. However, he becomes monstrous in his role as a concentration camp guard abusing detainees to impress his superiors. Ahmed sees the detainees being forced to eat bread from the ground with their hands behind their backs, to which Tawfiq replies: “These are the enemies of the homeland.”

Among the detainees are the writer Rashad Owais (Salah Qabil) and a geology professor (Gamil Ratib). The naïve, simple Ahmed objects to the army feeding the prisoners and guards them avidly, working to quash any escape attempts while callous to the ill treatment he witnesses. In his eyes, the brutality is justified to achieve the goal of enemies being killed so that soldiers can return home. When an inspection committee comes, the inmates are dutifully treated better, with a library and an association football field to complete the Potemkin village.

The ney symbolizes the one thing that prevents a functionary of this system from becoming a machine of brutality. Ahmed loves to play it but is ordered to discard it when caught, and it falls from the guard tower to the ground. Thus ends the film’s first act, while its second begins with the detainees singing a cappella a song with lyrics by Abdel Rahman el-Abnudi, “أغني بدموعي لضحكة الأوطان” (“I Sing with Tears for the Laughter of the Homeland”). In the second act, Rashad Owais tries to leave but is pursued avidly by Ahmed, who ultimately chokes Rashad to death as the detainees chant “You don’t understand anything.” Ahmed believes, however, that he is purifying the country of enemies and will be rewarded with leave to his village and the rank of corporal for his heroism.

At the climax of the film, a group of university students come to the prison as punishment for their activism, and Ahmed prepares to beat them. He finds that none other than Hussein Wahdan is among the students. Ahmed disobeys the orders, standing as a human shield against the whip for a man he insists cannot be an “enemy of the homeland.” Hussein dies in Ahmed’s arms of a snake bite as his friend realizes that he is not fighting true enemies of Egypt. After a look of realization flashes in his eyes, he accompanies the detainees’ lament on his handmade ney while carrying his machine gun in the other hand. As vehicles carry more prisoners in, he raises the machine gun and screams, the end for viewers at the time of release but followed in the director’s cut by him shooting at his superiors (one of whom returns fire killing him) as well as detainees knocking on the doors of the trucks demanding freedom.

== Production ==
Actor Ahmed Zaki insisted that Mahmoud Abdel Aziz throw real poisonous snakes on him in the prison cell to trigger fears by way of method acting. Zaki said: “I had a genuine phobia of snakes and tried to avoid them altogether, but it was an unforgettable experience.”

When Wahid Hamed was writing the script, he had Zaki in mind to play Ahmed Saba’a el-Leel from the start. Zaki turned it down at first since he did not feel he could produce it, but Samira Ahmed bought it off him and ironically chose him to star. Hamed went through an incident that inspired the film during the 1977 Egyptian bread riots.

Among the more implausible scenes was that in which Sharkas on horseback and Saba’a on foot both chase down Rashad’s truck.

A disclaimer inserted to appease the censors at the start of the film claims the following: “The facts of this film do not represent the current situation.”

The film includes two songs sung and composed by Ammar El Sherei.

== Songs ==
Songs in score
Title	Lyricist	Composer	Singer
“يا قبضتي” (“Oh My Fist”)	Ammar El Sherei	Ammar El Sherei	Ammar El Sherei
“محبوس يا طير الحق” (“In Jail, Oh My Right-Hand Bird”)	Ammar El Sherei	Ammar El Sherei	Ammar El Sherei

== Reception ==
Some critics believe that the script included scenes in the countryside with Ahmed to establish his actions as justified. On the other hand, the humanization of Mahmoud Abdel Aziz’s character outside of his role as warden did not affect or justify his brutality within the walls. Others have called the performance of Zaki his best since he never strays too far from the level of naïveté for which the role calls. Rather than stretching to play the character, the star seems to reach a part of his personality deep within that is untamed by civilization.

Some critics believe that the movie did not approach its serious themes with sensitivity. The traditional narrative was lost between the poignant melodrama, random violence, and political agitprop. Hence, the film’s screenwriting could be seen as weak despite the bold ideas that sustain it.

== See also ==
- List of Egyptian films
