= Dahab (film) =

1953 film by Anwar Wagdi

- Directed by: Anwar Wagdy
- Screenplay by: Abo El Seoud El Ebiary; Anwar Wagdy
- Produced by: Kamal El-Telmissany
- Starring: Anwar Wagdy; Feyrouz
- Cinematography: Wahid Farid
- Edited by: Leon D. Cazes
- Music by: Bayram al-Tunisi; Mounir Mourad; Ezzat El Gahely
- Release date: 23 March 1953
- Running time: 115 minutes
- Country: Egypt
- Language: Egyptian Arabic

Dahab (Arabic: ذهب, lit. 'Gold') is a 1953 Egyptian comedy musical film directed by Anwar Wagdy, starring the 10-year-old wunderkind Feyrouz alongside Wagdy in one of the most important films of her career.

== Cast ==
- Anwar Wagdy as Wahid Alfonso
- Feyrouz as Dahab
- Magda as the adult Dahab
- Ismail Yassine as Farah, the theatre owner
- Zeinat Sedki as Baltia
- Seraj Munir as Mounir El Dinary, Dahab's father
- Mimi Chakib as Mounir El Dinary's wife

== See also ==
- Cinema of Egypt
- Lists of Egyptian films
- List of Egyptian films of the 1950s
- List of Egyptian films of 1953
