= Ahmed Zaki (actor) =

Egyptian actor (1949–2005)

- أحمد زكي
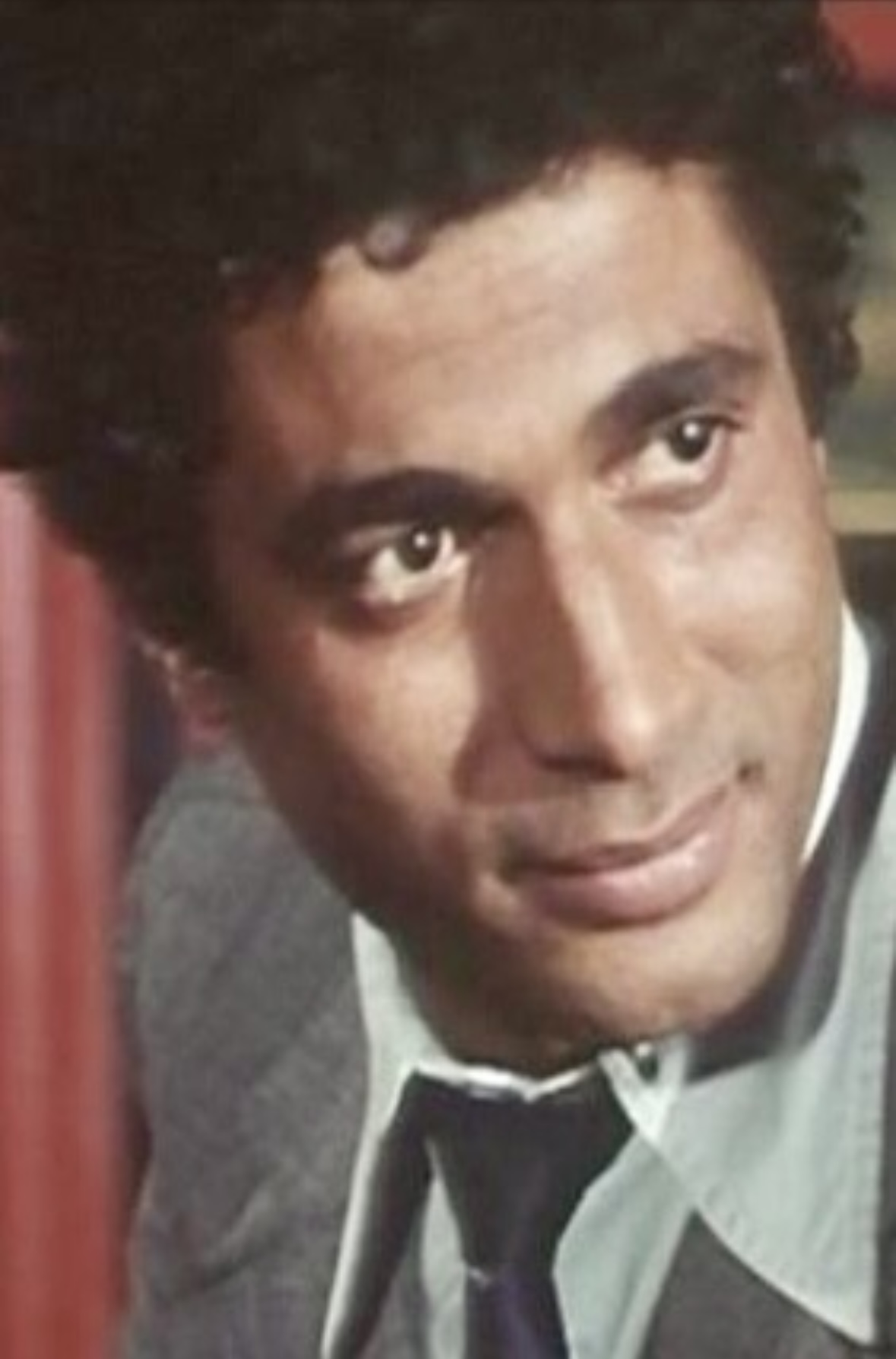
- Zaki in 1979
- Born: Ahmed Zaki Metwally Abdelrahman Badawi; 18 November 1946; Zagazig, Sharqia, Egypt
- Died: 27 March 2005 (aged 58); 6th of October, Giza, Egypt
- Other name: The Emperor
- Education: Cairo Higher Institute for Drama Studies
- Occupations: Actor, film producer
- Years active: 1967–2005
- Spouse: Hala Fouad (1980–1984)
- Children: Haitham Ahmed Zaki

Ahmed Zaki Metwally Abdelrahman Badawi (Arabic: أحمد زكي; 18 November 1946 – 27 March 2005), was an Egyptian actor. He was characterized by his talent, skill, and ability in impersonating. He was also famous for his on-screen intensity. Zaki is widely regarded as one of the greatest film actors in the history of Egyptian cinema.

Though he first appeared in a small role in the 1969 comedy play Hallo Shalaby, he is widely credited as one of the most talented male actors, especially in dramatic and tragic roles. His first film role was in Abnaa Al-Samt (1974). Then he went on to co-star in major films such as Alexandria... Why? (1979) by Youssef Chahine and Shafika and Metwali (1979) by Ali Badrakhan and alongside Soad Hosny who he starred with in A Dinner Date (1981). Zaki also starred in the television film I'm Not Lying But I'm Beautifying (1981).

Zaki has starred in many commercially and critically successful films, including Al-Awwama rakm 70 (1982), The Black Tiger (1984), The Innocent (1986), Shader al-samak (1986), El Beih El Bawwab (1987), Arba’a Fi Muhimma Rasmiya (1987), The Wife of an Important Man (1988), Kaboria (1990), El-Baydha Wal Hagar (1990), Al Embrator (1990), One Woman Is Not Enough (1990), Escape (1991), Mr Karate (1993), Sawwaq el hanem (1993), Nasser 56 (1996), Esstakoza (1996), The Land of Fear (2000), The Days of Sadat (2001), and Ma'ali al Wazir (2003).

== Early life and education ==
Ahmed Zaki was born in the city of Zagazig, in Sharqia Governorate, Egypt. He graduated from Zagazig's Crafts School in 1967 and then traveled to Cairo to study cinema before he graduated from the Higher Institute of Drama Studies in 1974.

== Career highlights ==
Many of his films were written by screenwriter Wahid Hamed and had a strong political message that exposed governmental and police corruption. This gave Zaki the image of an "underdog hero of the people" among Egyptian audiences, particularly among the country's youth. He also starred in the famous 1985 television comedy musical series Howa wa Heya with actress Soad Hosny. While not generally an "action star", Zaki played the lead in a number of successful action movies during the mid-and late-1990s, which added to his "hero of the people" status among audiences.

Two of his greatest successes were playing Egypt's presidents in two popular movies that became landmarks of Arabic cinema. He played presidents Gamal Abdel Nasser in Nasser 56 (1996), a movie that centered on the fateful summer of 1956 when then-President Nasser nationalizing the Suez Canal, and Anwar Sadat in the movie The Days of Sadat (2001) with director Mohamed Khan which he also produced. The movie depicted 40 years of the late president's life. He also had plans to play President Hosni Mubarak in a third movie. In the 1980s, Zaki acted alongside leading actors from previous generations such as Salah Zulfikar and Ahmed Mazhar. He was also known for portraying prominent figures in Egyptian history like Taha Hussein.

Zaki was seen as an icon and spokesperson for the average Egyptian youth; some considered him a successor to Farid Shawki as film hero for the working class, the two starred together in two movies several years earlier. He was a known heavy smoker. Zaki had been in intensive care at Dar Al Fouad Hospital in Sixth of October City, just outside Cairo, and died of lung cancer complications, after president Hosni Mubarak offered to send him to France for medical treatment at the government's expense and granted him the Order of Merit for his work in over 50 movies.

A book about Zaki has been released under the title of Ahmad Zaki wa Symphoniet Ibda (Ahmad Zaki: A Symphonic Innovation Masterpiece). The book features details of his acting career and includes a compilation of articles by different critics, including Tarek El Shennawi, Mohammad Al Shafe’ee, and Waleed Saif.

== Legacy ==
On November 18, 2020, Google celebrated his 71st birthday with a Google Doodle, which included boxing gloves to refer to Al Nimr Al Aswad (The Black Tiger), a crab for Kaboria (The Crab), a camera for Edhak El-Sora Tetlaa’ Helwa (Smile, the Picture Will Come Out Fine), and the animals from Arba’a Fi Muhimma Rasmiya (Four on an Official Mission).

== Filmography ==
=== Film ===
- 1974: Abnaa Al-Samt (The Children of Silence) – Mahmoud
- 1978: El Omr Lahza (Life is a Moment)
- 1979: Alexandria... Why? – Ibrahim
- 1979: Shafika and Metwali
- 1980: Al Batneyya – Safrot
- 1981: Maowid ala ashaa – Shukri
- 1981: Ana La Aktheb Wlakenani Atajaml – Ibrahim
- 1981: Taer ala el tariq – Fares
- 1981: Oyun la tanam
- 1982: El-akdar el-damia – Kher
- 1982: Al-Awwama rakm 70
- 1983: Darb El Hawa – Abdel Aziz
- 1983: El Ehteyat Wageb – Hassan
- 1983: Al modmen
- 1984: The Black Tiger – Muhammed Hassan
- 1984: El-Raqesah wa el-Tabbal – Abdo
- 1984: El Lela AL Mawooda – Fathi
- 1984: The Prince – Prince Yousef Othman Basha
- 1984: Al-Takhshiba – Majdy El Douski
- 1985: Saad El Yateem – Zakaria
- 1986: Shader al-samak – Ahmad Abu Kamel
- 1986: Love on the Pyramids Plateau
- 1986: Al Bedaya (The Beginning)
- 1986: The Innocent – Ahmad Saba' Al Layl
- 1987: Arba’a Fi Muhimma Rasmiya – Anwar
- 1987: Al Makhtufa – Hussien
- 1987: The Wife of an Important Man – Hesham
- 1987: El Beih El Bawwab – Abdulsamee
- 1988: Al-Darga Al-Thalitha (The third Class) – Sorour
- 1988: Dreams of Hind and Camilia – Eid
- 1989: Those Guys – Zaki Al Humsani
- 1990: One Woman Is Not Enough – Hussam
- 1990: Kaboria – Hassan Hudhud
- 1990: El-Baydha Wal Hagar – Mustataa
- 1990: Al Embrator – Zeinhom Abdel-Haq
- 1991: Escape – Montaser Abdel Ghafour
- 1991: Al-Ra'i wal Nisaa (The Shepherd and the Women)
- 1992: Dhid el hokouma – Mustafa Khalaf
- 1992: Al Basha – Hazem El Shennawy
- 1993: Sawwaq el hanem – Hamada
- 1993: Mr Karate
- 1994: Al Ragol al Talet
- 1996: Esstakoza – Abbass
- 1996: Abo Dahab – Abo Dahab
- 1996: Nasser 56 – President Gamal Abdel Nasser
- 1996: Nazwa
- 1996: Hysteria
- 1997: Hassan Ellol (Hassan) – Hassan
- 1998: El Batal (The Hero)
- 1998: Edhak El-Sora Tetlaa’ Helwa (Smile to make the photo looks good, Sherif Arafa) – Sayed Gharib
- 2000: Ard el khof (The Land of Fear) – Yehia
- 2001: The Days of Sadat – President Anwar Sadat
- 2003: Ma'ali al Wazir – Ra'fat Rostom
- 2005–2006: Halim (directed by Sherif Arafa) – Abdel Halim Hafez (final film role)

=== Television ===
- 1979: El Ayam (TV Mini-Series) – Taha Hussein
- 1985: Howa wa heya (Him & Her) (TV Mini-Series) – Afifi Abu Al Naja / Mahrous Al Dishnawi Shawqi / Moonis Khalil / Majdi / Metwalli / Nader / Khaled / Medhat / Jalal

== See also ==
- List of Egyptian films of the 1980s
- List of Egyptian films of the 1990s
