= El Guindi (surname) =

El Guindi (with many variant spellings in English) is an Egyptian surname from Classical Arabic al-jundi (الجندي) ("soldier").

== People surnamed El Guindi ==
- Abdel Moneim El-Guindi (fly-weight boxer)
- Ahmed El Guindi (director)
- Amina El-Guindi (politician)
- Fadwa El Guindi (anthropologist)
- Hosni Guindi (journalist)
- Karla Guindi (wife of Mexican actor Erick Elías)
- Mohamed El-Guindi (footballer)
- Nadia El Guindi a.k.a. El Gindy, El Gendy, Arabic: نادية الجندي (actress, producer)
- Youssef El Guindi (politician and leader in Zefta)
- Yussef El Guindi (playwright)

== Fictional characters surnamed El Guindi ==
- Mahmoud El Guindi (Howa wa heya television drama)
