= Halim (film) =

Halim حليم
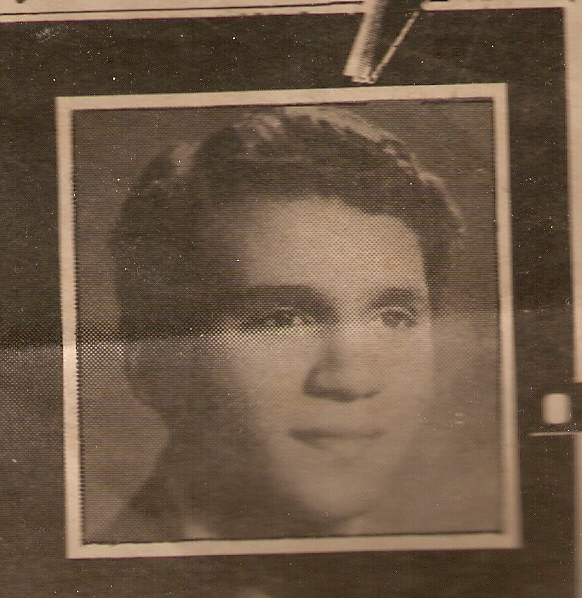
- Halim when he was young
- Directed by: Sherif Arafa
- Starring: Ahmed Zaki; Mona Zaki
- Release date: 2006
- Running time: 155 minutes
- Country: Egypt
- Language: Arabic

Halim (Arabic: حليم) is a 2006 Egyptian film about the Egyptian singer Abdel Halim Hafez. Production started in 2005 with Ahmed Zaki in the title role, but the actor died prior to the film's completion, so his son (Haitham Ahmed Zaki) filled in several scenes. The film was released in July 2006 with Mona Zaki, Sulaf Fawakherji, directed by Sherif Arafa, written by Mahfouz Abd El-Rahman, music by Ammar El Sherei and produced by Good News 4 Film & Music Company. It participated out of the competition at the 2006 Cannes Film Festival.

== Cast ==
- Ahmed Zaki as Abdel Halim Hafez
- Haitham Ahmed Zaki as Abdel Halim Hafez - Young
- Mona Zaki as Nawal
- Jamal Suliman as Ramzi
- Sulaf Fawakherji as Jeehan
- Ezzat Abou Aouf as Mohammed Abdel Wahab
