= Hoda Ammar =

Egyptian pop singer (born 1971)

Hoda Ammar هدى عمار
- Born: Hoda Ammar هدى عمار; February 25, 1971 (age 54)
- Origin: Giza, Egypt
- Genres: Egyptian music
- Occupation: Singer
- Years active: 1989–present
- Labels: Free Music; Alam El Phan; Mazzika

Hoda Ammar (Arabic: هدى عمار) (born February 25, 1971) is an Egyptian singer.

== Her life and upbringing ==
Born on February 25, 1971, in Giza Egypt, she joined the conservatory at Academy of Arts in Cairo and studied playing the harp until she obtained a bachelor's degree.

== Her career ==
She was discovered by the musician Ammar El-Sherei, when he tried to form a new band, after the separation of the members of the Friends band, and Hoda was the last to apply for the test, and she almost missed the listening session. Ammar El-Sherei helped her and gave her his name, and she became Hoda Ammar.

== Her works ==
The producer Mohsen Jaber helped her and produced four albums for her, and they were well received by the public. The musician Ammar El Sherei encouraged and cared for her to continue her artistic career and composed her first album. The great musician Mohamed El Mougy composed a radio song for her. She also sang the introduction and ending of the series Hawanem Garden City and Banat Souad Hanem and episodes of One Thousand and One Nights. She also participated in many of the October and Muhammadan Night celebrations. Among her most famous songs are “Qalbi El Sagheer” and “Ma Kadbish Alayk” and “Beghayer Alayk” and “Ala Einy”. She also sang the song “Habibti Min Dfayrha” which was composed by the musician Ammar El Sherei in the movie Katibat El Idam directed by Atef El Tayeb.
