= Ginza (disambiguation) =

Ginza is a district of Chūō, Tokyo, Japan.

Ginza may refer to:

== Geography ==
- Ginza (agency), origin of the district name; a regulatory commission or guild, overseers of silver production in Edo period Japan
- Ginza Line, a metro line in Tokyo, Japan
- Ginza Station, a metro station in Tokyo, Japan
- Togoshi-ginza Station, a metro station in Tokyo, Japan
- Ginza stop, a MTR Light Rail Stop in Hong Kong
- Ginza Plaza, a shopping mall in Singapore

== Others ==
- THE GINZA, a Japanese cosmetic brand owned by Shiseido
- Ginza Samba, a Jazz song written by Vince Guaraldi
- Ginza Musik, a Swedish mail order company
- Ginza Rabba, the central holy scripture of the Mandaean religion
  - Left Ginza, a part of the Ginza Rabba
  - Right Ginza, a part of the Ginza Rabba
- "Ginza" (song), 2015 song by J Balvin

== See also ==
- Giza (disambiguation)
