= Escape (1991 film) =

1991 Egyptian film

- Directed by: Atef El Tayeb
- Screenplay by: Mostafa Moharram
- Produced by: Medhat El-Sherif
- Starring: Ahmed Zaki
- Cinematography: Mohsen Nasr
- Edited by: Nadia Shoukry
- Music by: Moudy El-Imam
- Production companies: Tamido Production and Distribution
- Distributed by: Tamido Production and Distribution
- Release date: 1991
- Country: Egypt
- Language: Egyptian Arabic

Escape (Arabic: الهروب) also alternatively titled The Escape in English, is a 1991 Egyptian vigilante film directed by Atef El-Tayeb and produced by Medhat El-Sherif, It stars Ahmed Zaki. The story revolves around Montasser, who, after being released from prison, seeks revenge on those who destroyed his life. He becomes a fugitive, pursued by the police.

The Escape is considered one of the iconic films of Egyptian cinema in the 1990s. It is inspired by the classic novel The Count of Monte Cristo by Alexandre Dumas, which has been adapted into various forms and dramatic plots in both Egyptian and international art.

== Plot ==
Muntaser Abdel Ghaffar Al-Badri (Ahmed Zaki) is a young man from the village of Al-Hajer in the Saqilat Center of Sohag, Upper Egypt. His father was a falconer who spent long periods in the desert hunting falcons, a life that deeply influenced Muntaser, who admired the bird’s freedom and dominance. After his father's death, Muntaser’s mother, hoping to prevent him from following in his father's footsteps, burned all his hunting tools. She instead placed her hopes in her eldest son, Abdullah, a dutiful and obedient farmer.

As Muntaser grows up, he becomes involved with Medhat (Youssef Fawzy), the corrupt director of an office that arranges illegal emigration of Egyptian workers to the Gulf. After initially working with Medhat to earn money, Muntaser is framed by him for drug possession and imprisoned. Upon his release, Muntaser faces further betrayal when his wife, seduced and trafficked by a woman named Rajwat, ends up in prostitution in Turkey. Accused of her murder, Muntaser goes on the run. His situation worsens when he is betrayed again—this time by his childhood friend Saeed, who steals his money and informs on him to the authorities.

As Muntaser is drawn deeper into a web of crime and betrayal, police officer Salem (Abdulaziz Makhyoun) is tasked with his capture. What begins as a manhunt evolves into a tragic confrontation that changes the lives of all involved. Throughout, the story is echoed by Saedi mourning and the lamentations of rababa storytelling, foreshadowing an inevitable tragedy.

== Cast ==
- Ahmed Zaki as Muntasir Abdel Ghafour
- Abdelaziz Makhyoun as Salem( the officer)
- Hala Sedky as Sabah( dancer)
- Zozo Nabil as Muntasir's mother
- Abu Bakr Ezzat as Ismail( major General)
- Hassan Hosny as ( Assistant Minister)
- Mohamed Wafik as Fouad Al-Sharnoubi
- Youssef Fawzy as( Medhat)
- Mahmoud Al-Bazzawi as Abdullah Abdul Ghaffar
- Abdullah Musharraf as Omran
- Laila Shaer as Najwan
- Aida Fahmy as Zainab
- Sherif Mounir
- Bassam Ragab as Kamal( Officer)
- Hanim Muhammed
- Samir Waheed as( Farid Ezzat - coin dealer)
- Ahmed Abu Obeya
- Ahmad Adam as( Aziz - journalist)
- Mohamed Henedy as Qanawi Abu Ismail
- Mutawa Owais
- Mohammed Abu Hashish
- Ahmed Abdel Aziz
- Salah Abdallah as Forger Mr. Makhzanji
- Mofeed Ashour

== Staff ==
- Atef El-Tayeb as the film director.
- Written by: Mustafa Muharram (Story) Bashir Al Deek (Screenplay and dialogue)
- Mohsen Nasr as Director of Photography
- Nadia Shoukry (montage)
- Production Department: Tamidou Production and Distribution (Medhat El Sherif)
- Ibrahim Al-Mashnab as Executive Producer
- Magdy Kamel (II) (Audio Engineer)
- Tamido Productions and Distribution as Distribution Company
- The soundtrack, which is one of the immortal works of Modi Al-Imam, was sung on the stage of the program with the voice of many young talents and led by the orchestra of musician Nader Abbasi
