= Secret Visit =

1981 film

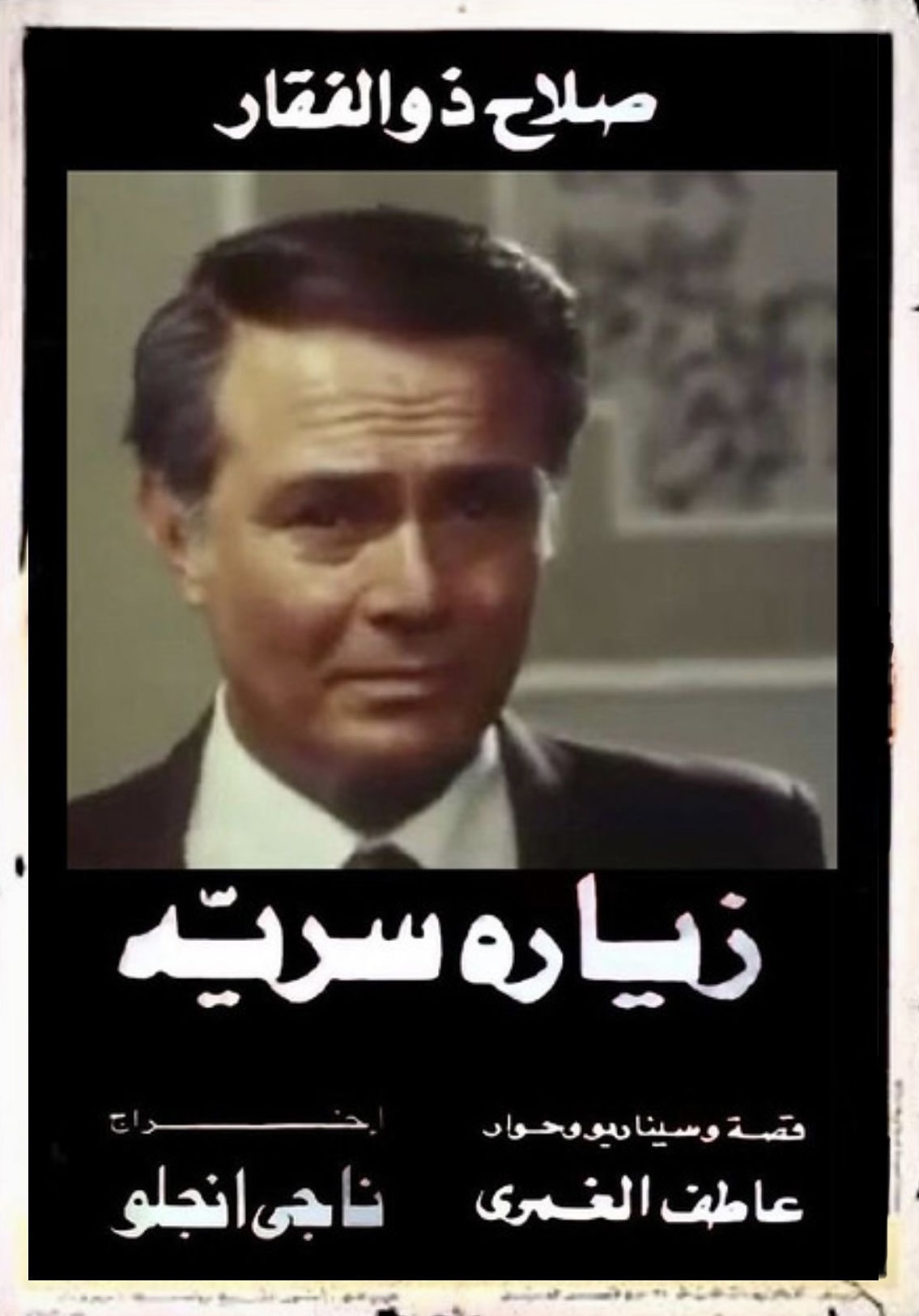
- Film poster
- Arabic: زيارة سرية
- Directed by: Nagy Anglo
- Written by: Atef El Ghamry
- Produced by: Mamdouh El Leithy
- Starring: Salah Zulfikar; Athar El-Hakim; Mahmoud El-Meliguy
- Cinematography: Gamil Isaac
- Edited by: Adel Mounir
- Music by: Gehad Daood
- Release date: 1981
- Country: Egypt
- Language: Egyptian Arabic

Secret Visit (Arabic: زيارة سرية, translit: Zeyara Serreya) is a 1981 Egyptian film starring Salah Zulfikar, Athar El-Hakim, and Mahmoud El Meliguy. It was written by Atef El-Ghamry, and directed by Nagy Anglo.

== Synopsis ==
An accused who is sentenced to death by the judge Ismail, and all the evidence against him, but the accused denies committing the crime, which prompted his daughter to visit the judge in his home, and she is confident in the innocence of her father. The judge goes to the accused in a secret visit.

== Cast ==
- Salah Zulfikar as Judge Ismail
- Athar El-Hakim as Nawal Attia Al-Nabrawi
- Mahmoud El-Meliguy as Attia Al-Nabawy
- Mariam Fakhr Eddine as Olfat, Ismail's wife
- Nabil Noureddine as Nabil Ismail
- Galal Issa as Ibrahim
- Samah Anwar as Noha Ismail
- Nabil El-Desouky as Owaidah El-Shamy
- Ali El-Sharif as coffee shop owner
- Abdul Rahim Al-Zarqani as Fahmy Al-Sayed
- Nadia Rafeeq as Nawal's mother
- Soad Hussein as Azhaar, Fahmy El-Sayed's wife

== See also ==
- Salah Zulfikar filmography
- List of Egyptian films of 1981
