= Kuwait Connection =

- Poster
- Directed by: Samir A. Khouri
- Written by: Samir A. Khouri
- Produced by: Arab Film Distribution
- Starring: Ezzat El Alaili
- Music by: Patrick Samson
- Release date: 1973
- Running time: 91 minutes
- Country: Egypt
- Language: Arabic

Kuwait Connection (Arabic: ذئاب لا تاكل اللحم Dhiʼāb lā taʼakulu al-laḥm) is a 1973 Egyptian action film directed by Lebanese director Samir A. Khouri and featuring a predominantly Egyptian main cast with Lebanese and Kuwaiti actors. The film was released on DVD by Sabbah Media Corporation in 2002.

== Plot ==
Hired assassin Anwar (Ezzat El Alaili) runs from the police and, wounded, takes refuge in rich libertine Walid's (Mohsen Sarhan) mansion outside Kuwait City. As Anwar narrates his story to Walid's wife Soraya (Nahed Sherif), it is revealed that he was an idealist reporter who became disillusioned with humanity after atrocities he witnessed (starting with Deir Yassin) and was drawn to the criminal world.

== Cast ==
- Ezzat El Alaili: Anwar
- Mohsen Sarhan: Walid
- Nahed Sherif: Soraya
- Liz Sarkisian: Nihad, Walid's daughter
- Silvana Badrkhan: Linda, Anwar's partner
- Mohammed Al-Mansor: Nihad's lover
