= Giza (disambiguation) =

Giza is a city in Egypt.

Giza may also refer to:

== Places ==
- Giza Governorate, in Egypt
- Giza Peak, a mountain in Antarctica
- Giza pyramid complex

== Music ==
- Giza (EP), an extended play by Gatekeeper
- Giza Studio, a Japanese record label

== Other uses ==
- FF Giza, a Faroese football club
- 5249 Giza, a minor planet
- Giza (surname)

== See also ==
- Ginza (disambiguation)
