= Anyab =

- Directed by: Mohamed Shebl
- Screenplay by: Hassn Abd Raboo; Tarek Sharara; Mohammed Shebl
- Starring: Ahmed Adawiya; Ali El Haggar; Hasan El-Emam; Mona Gabr
- Music by: Hussien El Imam; Modi El Imam
- Release date: 1981
- Running time: 100 minutes
- Country: Egypt
- Language: Arabic

Anyab (Arabic: أنياب, lit. 'Fangs') is a 1981 film by Mohammed Shebl loosely inspired by The Rocky Horror Picture Show (1975). Some critics consider the film to be a classic of Egyptian queer cinema, blending horror, fantasy and musical genres.

== Plot ==
Mona (Mona Gabr) and her fiancé, Ali (Ali El Haggar), are driving to a New Year's Eve party when they get a flat tire. They are stranded in the rain and find only a castle for shelter. In it, they unknowingly meet an array of vampires led by Count Dracula, who falls in love with Mona at first sight. The film breaks the fourth wall to inform viewers that Dracula exists in Egypt and takes many forms through a series of vignettes with a doctor, cab driver, plumber, and others as "unscrupulous" individuals in Egyptian society, then experiencing economic liberalization. These "vampires" suck people's money rather than their blood.

== Release and reception ==
The film was submitted to censor review in late summer 1981. Upon review, authorities declared a ban on the film, and demanded that all copies be turned over and destroyed. In response, multiple Egyptian intellectuals attempted to intervene, including "writer Ahmed Baha El Din, filmmaker Youssef Chahine, and actress Nadia Lotfy". Authorities ultimately agreed to release the film, with six minutes cut due to political connotations in two scenes. The film released in theatres in September 1981, where it was a financial failure. Many critics, likely unaware of the influence of Rocky Horror on the work, considered it "as a lowbrow oddity, an artistically crude experiment".

According to film scholar Basil Dababneh, Anyab inhabits a marginal position both in the history of Egyptian cinema and the horror genre globally because the film was heavily censored at release and has been largely forgotten.

The London gallery Gasworks has described Anyab as a "lost gem of Egyptian queer cinema" and an "unfaithful remake" of Rocky Horror, and praised the film for its weaving of camp aesthetics, horror tropes and disco soundtrack with social commentary and sexual politics.

Egyptian journalist and artist Ali Abdel Mohsen, in a positive appraisal of the film, has argued that it is nonetheless a mistake to call Anyab a remake of Rocky Horror. Rather, it "can be more accurately described as a movie made by a guy who's seen 'The Rocky Horror Picture Show' and really wants you to know it."

Film critic Joseph Fahim included Anyab in a 2024 list of "10 great supernatural films from the Middle East and North Africa" for the British Film Institute.
