= Deprived Lover =

- العاشق المحروم
- Directed by: El-Sayed Ziada
- Written by: Ali El Zorkani; El-Sayed Ziada (screenplay and dialogue)
- Produced by: Mahrous Ziada; El-Sayed Ziada
- Starring: Ismail Yassine; Amina Rizk; Mohsen Sarhan; Kamal el-Shennawi; Doria Ahmed; Mansi Fahmy; Hssan Fayek; Afaf Shaker; Shafik Galal; Kaiti Voutsaki; Fathiah Shahin; Mohamed Kamel
- Cinematography: Abdulaziz Fahmy
- Edited by: Albert Najib
- Music by: Abdel Rahman al-Khatib; Abdul Muti Hassan; El-Sayed Qasim
- Production company: Sorour Films
- Release date: May 16, 1954
- Running time: 100 minutes
- Country: Egypt
- Language: Arabic

Deprived Lover (Arabic: العاشق المحروم, transliterated as El-asheeq el-mashroom) is an Egyptian musical comedy drama film released on May 16, 1954. The film is directed and co-written by El-Sayed Ziada, features a screenplay co-written with Ali El Zorkani, and stars Mohsen Sarhan, Amina Rizk, Kamal el-Shennawi, and Ismail Yassine. The rich protagonist fails to drown his son but is ultimately repaid successfully for his sin by his own son to break a will forbidding the son and his mother from inheriting unless they stay unmarried.

== Cast ==
- Mohsen Sarhan (Fouad Abdelaziz, an engineer)
- Amina Rizk (Amina, a nurse)
- Kamal el-Shennawi (Raouf, son of Amina and Fouad)
- Ismail Yassine (Bassiouni, Tawfik Bey’s chauffeur)
- Doria Ahmed (Khadra, Tawfik Bey’s maid)
- Mansa Fahmy (Tawfik Shukri Bey)
- Hassan Fayek (Hassan Effendi, President of the Association to Fight Poverty, Ignorance, and Disease)
- Naima Gamal (Naima, a dancer)
- Fathiah Shahin
- Mohamed Kamel
- Afaf Shaker (Nahid)
- Mohsen Hassanein
- Gina
- Katy (dancer)
- Shafik Galal (singing)
- Mahmoud al-Araby
- Samar Ziada (child)

Kamal el-Shennawi and Doria Ahmed were among the most famous duos in Egyptian cinema, co-starring in five films between the late 1940’s and mid-1950’s: after Forbidden Happiness (1948), The Mayor’s Daughter (1949), The Adventures of Khadra (1950), and Khadra and the Southern Sinbad (1951), this was their final vehicle.

Afaf Shaker (1929-2020), the sister of famed musical actress Shadia, married young to El-Shennawi but only for one month, and Deprived Lover was among her most famed roles.

Mansi Fahmy (1890-1955, born Mansi Abiskharon) starred in over 54 works in a career in cinema and theatre stretching back to the 1930’s.

== Synopsis ==
Tawfik Shukri Bey (Mansi Fahmy), president of the Maritime Navigation Company, is hospitalized and falls in love with attending nurse Amina (Amina Rizk). The company’s captain Fouad Abdelaziz (Mohsen Sarhan) visits Tawfik Bey in the hospital, where he and Amina have a mutual love affair and secretly marry to evade restrictions on nurses doing so. When Tawfik gets wind of this development, he tries to separate the couple but fails, turning instead to asking his servant (Mohsen Hassanein) to blow up and sink Fouad’s boat. Fouad disappears and is pronounced dead in absentia while he wakes up amnesiac. Captured by sailors, he joins their crew.

Tawfik consoles the grieving Amina and learns from the doctor that she is pregnant. Ostensibly to give the baby his family name and thus keep her agreement, Tawfik proposes to Amina. Amina gives birth to a son named Raouf and buys Fouad’s rented bungalow to preserve his memory. Rouaf (Kamal el-Shennawi) grows up and is taken under Tawfik’s wing to the latter’s dens of iniquity to corrupt him, thereby getting the crooked mentor his revenge. Raouf gives in to a life of dissipation, and his mother’s efforts to straighten him out fail.

Tawfik introduces Raouf to a rakiya dancer named Naima (Naima Gamal), who wants the young man for his father’s inheritance. Amina objects and decides to bring Raouf with her to the countryside, to which Tawfik promises to help the boy reform. Tawfik schemes to drown Raouf and takes him onto a boat that happens to be sailed by Fouad. Tawfik drowns and Raouf survives, prompting an investigation into Fouad that ultimately comes to naught, leaving Amina to the task of restoring her beloved’s memory.

Tawfik’s final gambit is to write in his will that his wealth can only be transferred to his wife and son if neither marries; if either does, the money goes to his chauffeur Bassiouni (Ismail Yassine) and his maid Khadra (Doria Ahmed). Hassan Effendi, meanwhile, runs on a non-profit and aims for all to marry so that the inheritance can go to his organization. While Bassiouni and Khadra make one couple and a recovered Fouad and Amina make another, but Raouf wants to stay single and for his mother to do the same so he keeps the money. When Naima cheats with his friend (Anwar Mohamed) and leaves, however, Raouf agrees to marry Nahid (Afaf Shaker), who finds in a box a letter from Tawfik explaining that Raouf is not his son but a bastard. Raouf’s secretary explains that Fouad was in a common-law marriage, and Fouad reunites his family, proving love more important than money and giving the charity the inheritance.

== Songs ==
Songs in score
Title	Lyricist	Composer
“يا ست يا سيدة” (“Oh, My Lady”)	Yahya al-Dahshan	Abdel Muti Hassan
“يا عيب الشوم” (“Oh, Mark of Shame”)	Muhammad Fathi Mahdi	Abdel Rahman al-Khatib
“الحب والمال” (“Love and Money”)	El-Sayed Ziada	Abdel Rahman al-Khatib
“اهلا وسهلا” (“Welcome”)	Qasim Mazhar	El-Sayed Qasim
“اهلا وسهلا” (“Oh, Sword Dancer”)	Ali Suleiman	El-Sayed Qasim

Actors who sing on the soundtrack include Doria Ahmed, Shafik Galal, and Ismail Yassine.

== Reception ==
Film critic Mahmoud Kassem wrote in Al-Shorouk on August 19, 2022 that “this is a movie completely unknown to cinephiles and yet it stars major stars, most of whom only acted together on screen this once.” Pointing out the poor documentation of the history of Egyptian cinema, Kassem states the following:

The film was long-delayed, since El-Sayed Ziada discovered and married Doria Ahmed but worked with her in small roles before this starring debut. Rewriting the history of this film and trying to understand it requires documents and people unavailable to us, and unfortunately there is little testimony except for a rare film book I owned. In addition, some early films such as the Amina Rizk vehicle Cleopatra are lost, obscuring the stars’ early career.
