= Ali El Haggar =

Egyptian actor and singer (born 1954)

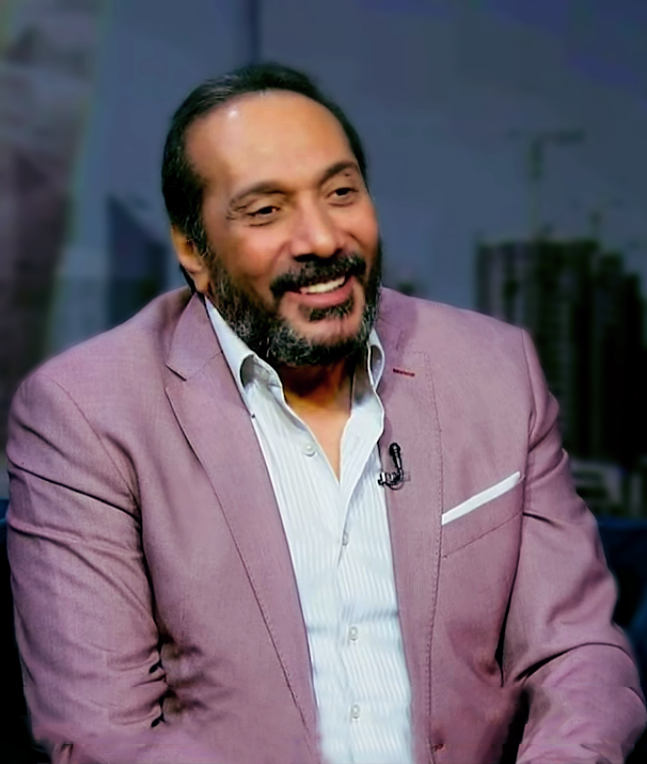
- El-Haggar in 2022
- Born: 4 April 1954 (age 72); Imbaba, Giza, Egypt
- Occupations: Actor, composer, artist

Ali El Haggar (Arabic: علي الحجار, born on 4 April 1954 in Imbaba, Giza), he is an Egyptian singer, artist, composer, and actor.

== Collaborations ==
El-Haggar works with famous composers and lyricists as well as with other singers in duets whenever possible. "In duets I like to deal with talented singers; as competing with clever singers motivates me to explore my capabilities to execute the song in the best distinguished manner". During his career El-Haggar has performed a number of duets with singers such as his career companion Mohammed El-Helw, in songs such as "Beladi" and "Khan El-Anadeel" (the opening and closing of a TV serial carrying the same name), with Hanan Mady in many television serial songs like "El-Likaa El-Tany & El-Mal we El-Banoon", with Angham in the play "Rosasa Fi El Qalb", and with Hoda Ammar in "Bent we Walad" from the movie Eskendereyya New York.

Another important phase in El-Haggar's professional life was his first collaboration with his brother, the composer and singer Ahmed El-Haggar. This was in 1978 when Ahmed El-Haggar composed his brother's hit "Ozoriny". The success that this song achieved sparked El-Haggar's singing career. The El-Haggar brothers have co-operated in many other songs, Ahmed El-Haggar as composer and Ali El-Haggar as lyricist. Among these songs are: "Bahebek", "Ana Biki Ya Samra Akon", "El-Ahlam", "Kont Faker", "Tesaaliny", "Lama El-Sheta Edo’o El-Biban", "Ma Tekdebish", "Ergaaily", "Lessa El-Kalam", and recently "Ya Masria".

== Awards ==
El-Haggar was awarded a prize of honor in the 15th Arabic Music Festival for the year 2006 as well as two prizes from two different European theatre festivals in both Germany and Italy. He also received "Best Singer of the Year" in a Sharm El-Sheikh video clip festival for his song "El-Leil Ya Nas".

== Works ==
=== Albums ===
- Ala ad ma Habaina
- Kont fain ya Ali (for children)
- Robaeyat "Salah Jaheen"
- Mehtajlek
- Ozoreeni
- El Ahlam
- Matsadaqish
- Fi Alb El Lail
- Ana kont Eidek
- Zay El Hawa
- Lem El Shaml
- Tegeesh Naeesh
- Rama Remsho
- Lessa El Kalam
- Risha
- Yamama
- Maktobali
- Es-ha Ya Nayer

=== Television themes ===
- Al Ayaam
- El Shahd Wa El Domooa
- Ala Abwab El Madina
- Wa Qal Al Bahr
- Al Mashrabeyya
- Abdullah Al Nadim
- El lel W Akhro
- Haroon El Rashid
- Omar Ebn Abdel Aziz
- Mohammad Rasool Allah
- Wajaa Al Baad
- Al sira Al Helaleyya
- Hadaek Al Shaytan
- Zeaab El Gabal
- Al Mal wal Banoun
- Al Leqaa Al Thani

=== Television series – singing and acting ===
- Yaseen we Baheyya
- Abul El Ela Elbeshry
- Al Baqy men Al zaman sa3a
- Al wakf
- Resala khatera
- Bawabat El Halawani
- Al Awda
- Robaeyyat Salah Jaheen

=== Movies ===
- Al Meghnawati
- Anyab (1981)
- Al Fata Al Shereer

=== Plays ===
- Laila men alf laila
- Zabaaen Gohannam
- Nawwar Al Khair
- Welad El Shawarea
- Menain ageeb nas
- Eyal Teganen
- Atnain fi offa
- Alahomma Egaalo khair
- Rosasa Fi Al Qalb
- Khayef Aqool Elly Fi Qalby
- Yamama Beida
