= Mohsen Sarhan =

Egyptian actor (1914–1993)

- Born: 6 January 1914; Port Said, Egypt
- Died: 7 February 1993 (aged 79); Cairo, Egypt
- Occupation: Actor
- Years active: 1914–1993
- Spouse: Samiha Ayoub

Mohsen Sarhan (Arabic: محسن سرحان; 6 January 1914 in Port Said – 7 February 1993 in Cairo) was an Egyptian actor in multiple films and as part of the National Troupe.

== Biography ==
One of his performances as part of the National Troupe received praise from The Scribe Arab Review. He was once married to Samiha Ayoub, who has been referred to as "Arab theatre's leading lady".

== Selected filmography ==
- Bint el-Basha el-Mudir (1938)
- Ibn El-balad (1942)
- Furigat (1951)
- Lak Yawm Ya Zalem (1951)
- The Final Encounter (1953)
- Deprived Lover (1954)
- Min alqatil (1956)
- Inni Attahim (1960)
- Kuwait Connection (1973)
- Truth Has a Voice (1976)
- Howa wa heya (1985) (TV miniseries)
