= Haitham Ahmed Zaki =

Egyptian actor (1984–2019)

- Born: Haitham Ahmed Zaki Abdelrahman هيثم أحمد زكي عبد الرحمن; 4 April 1984; Cairo, Egypt
- Died: 7 November 2019 (aged 35); Sheikh Zayed City, Giza, Egypt
- Occupation: Actor
- Years active: 2006–2019
- Parent(s): Ahmed Zaki (father); Hala Fouad (mother)

Haitham Ahmed Zaki (Arabic: هيثم أحمد زكي) (4 April 1984 – 7 November 2019), also known as Haitham Zaki (Arabic: هيثم زكي), was an Egyptian actor who predominantly worked in Egyptian cinema.

== Biography ==
He was the son of veteran actors Ahmed Zaki and Hala Fouad. He died on 7 November 2019 in his apartment at the age of 35 due to sudden circulatory collapse.

== Career ==
He followed in his parents' footsteps and joined the film industry at the age of 22. He made his film acting debut in 2006 for the film Halim. He was roped in to fill the scenes and to play the male lead in the film Halim on behalf of his father Ahmed Zaki, who eventually died in 2005 during the shooting of the film. He also notably won the Best Egyptian Male Actor award for his performance in the 2011 film Dawaran Shobra.

== Death ==
On 7 November 2019, he died in his apartment in Sheikh Zayed City at the age of 35 due to sudden circulatory collapse, a large amount of seawater was found near his body.

== Filmography ==
=== Film ===
- Halim (2006)
- Elbelyatsho 2007
- Kaf Alqamar 2011
- Dawaran Shobra (2011)
- Sukkar Mor (2015)
- The Treasure (2017)
- The Treasure 2 (2019)

=== TV series ===
- Al Sabaa Wasaya (2014)
- Kalabsh (2018)
- Alamet Estefham (2019)
