= Min alqatil =

Min alqatil من القاتل
- Directed by: Hasan El-Saifi; Mohammed Emara
- Written by: Mohamed Kamel Hassan
- Screenplay by: Mohamed Kamel Hassan, the lawyer; (story, screenplay and dialogue)
- Produced by: Lotus Film; (Asia and Associates) (project): Mustafa Abdul Latif; (Production Manager)
- Starring: Rushdy Abaza; Samira Ahmed; Ismail Yassin; Mohsen Sarhan; Mahmoud El-Melegy; Hussein Riad
- Cinematography: Mohamed Kamel Hassan, (story, screenplay and dialogue)
- Production company: *Elvis Orfanelli (Director of Photography)
- Release date: January 16, 1956
- Running time: 105
- Country: Egypt
- Language: Arabic

Min alqatil (Arabic: من القاتل, translit.) is a 1956 Egyptian romance/musical film directed and co-written by the Egyptian film director Hasan El-Saifi. It stars Rushdy Abaza,

== Plot ==
Souad Hanim is a victim of murder on the day of Samira's joy, and they throw her dead inside the garden, and several people are interrogated, and they are the events that follow during the investigation period about Majdi, especially, after he did not appear, and the events continue.

== Main cast ==
- Samira Ahmed
- Ismail Yassin
- Mohsen Sarhan
- Mahmoud El-Melegy
- Hussein Riad.
