= Samiha Ayoub =

Egyptian actress (1932–2025)

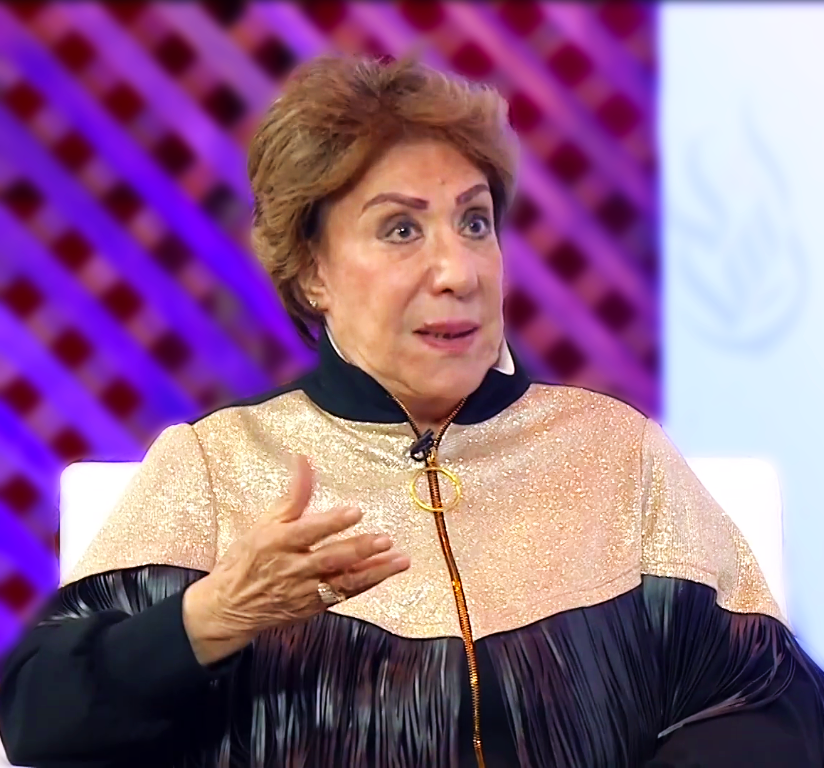
- Born: 8 March 1932; Shubra, Cairo, Kingdom of Egypt
- Died: 3 June 2025 (aged 93)
- Occupation: Actress
- Years active: 1947–2025
- Spouses: Mohsen Sarhan; Mahmoud Morsy; Saad Eddin Wehbe
- Awards: Order of Sciences and Arts (2015)

Samiha Ayoub (Arabic: سميحة أيوب; 8 March 1932 – 3 June 2025) was an Egyptian actress known for her work on stage, in film and on television. In 2015, she received the Nile Award in the Arts, and in the same year, the large hall in the National Theater was named after her, in honour of her outstanding career in cinema and theater, and her contributions to the theatrical arts in Egypt.

== Life and career ==
Samiha Ayoub was born in Shubra, Cairo on 8 March 1932. She graduated from the Nun's School then joined the Acting Institute in 1952. Her breakthrough came after her role in Samara and Rabaa ElAdawya (radio series). She has been married three times, to actor Mohsen Sarhan, actor Mahmoud Morsy, and playwright Sa’ed Eddine Wihbe (Saad Eddin Wehbe).

From 1972 to 1975, Ayoub managed The Modern Theatre, and from 1975 to 1985, she was the director of Al-Qawmy Theatre. She acted in the famous television miniseries El Miraya alongside Salah Zulfikar in 1984.

== Death ==
Ayoub died on 3 June 2025, at the age of 93.

== Selected filmography ==
=== Plays ===
- Al-Bakheel (The Miser)
- Kobry Al-Namoos (Mosquito Bridge)
- Sikkat Al-Salama (The Right Way)

=== Films ===
- Motashareda
- Shatea Al-Gharam Wal Wahsh
- Bein El Atlal (1959)
- Tita Rahiba (2012)
- El-Leila El-Kebira (2015)

=== Television ===
- El Miraya (1984)
