= I'm Not Lying But I'm Beautifying =

1981film

- Egyptian Arabic: أنا لا أكذب ولكني أتجمل
- Written by: Ihsan Abdel Qudous
- Screenplay by: Mamdouh El Leithy
- Directed by: Ibrahim El-Shaqanqeeri
- Starring: Salah Zulfikar; Ahmed Zaki; Athar El-Hakim
- Music by: Gamal Salama
- Country of origin: Egypt
- Original language: Arabic

Production
- Producer: Mamdouh El Leithy
- Cinematography: Said Bakr
- Editor: Abdel Aziz Fakhry
- Running time: 110 minutes
- Production company: Egyptian Television Network

Original release
- Release: 1 January 1981

I'm Not Lying But I'm Beautifying, also known as The Made Up Truth (Egyptian Arabic: أنا لا أكذب ولكني أتجمل, translit: Ana La Aktheb Wlakenani Atajaml), is a 1981 Egyptian television-film written by Ihsan Abdel Quddous and directed by Ibrahim El-Shaqanqeeri. It stars Salah Zulfikar, Ahmed Zaki, and Athar El-Hakim.

== Plot ==
Rafik Hamdy is a famous writer, who has one daughter, Khairya, a college student. Her colleague Ibrahim, the diligent student, falls in love with her and she also exchanges love, although the rich student Hani admires her, Ibrahim tries to hide the truth of his social level for fear that Khairiya will move away from him, to claim that he is from a wealthy family. But eventually, Rafik knows the truth and confronts Ibrahim and now Khairia must choose.

== Main cast ==
- Salah Zulfikar as Rafik Hamdy
- Ahmed Zaki as Ibrahim
- Athar El-Hakim as Khairia
- Zahret El-Ola as Nadia
- Nahed Samir as Mobrouka
- Farouk Youssef as Hani
- Maha Abu Ouf as Maisa
- Ahmed El Gezery as Saleh
- Mohamed Shawky as Madbouly
- Fatheya Chahine as Hani's mother
- Ahmed Khamis
