= Zahret El-Ola =

Egyptian actress (10 June 1934 – 2013)

- زهرة العلا
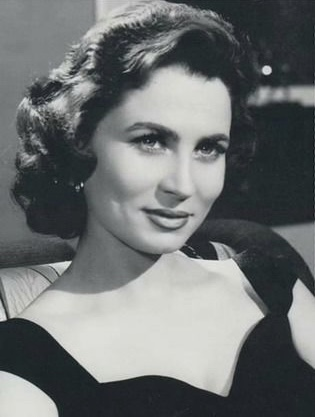
- El-Ola in 1957
- Born: Zahret El-Ola Mohamed Bakeer; 10 June 1934; Alexandria, Kingdom of Egypt
- Died: 18 December 2013 (aged 79); Cairo, Egypt
- Other names: Zahrat El-Ola
- Occupation: Actor
- Years active: 1951–1998
- Spouse(s): Salah Zulfikar (m. 1957; div. 1959) Hasan El-Saifi

Zahret El-Ola Mohamed Bakeer (Arabic: زهرة العلا محمد بكير; 10 June 1934 – 18 December 2013) was an Egyptian actress, famous for her roles in light comedies and drama in the 1950s and 1960s, the golden age of Egyptian cinema. She is considered one of the iconic actresses in Egypt. Her first appearance in film was in Mahmoud Zulfikar's My Father Deceived Me (1951), and her last film was Ard Ard (1998). She was the second wife of fellow actor Salah Zulfikar.

== Biography ==
Zahret El-Ola was born 10 June 1934 in Alexandria, Egypt. After obtaining a diploma from the Institute of Dramatic Arts, she moved with her family to Mahalla al-Kubra and then to Cairo where she was apprenticed by Youssef Wahbi and worked in his theater, then went to work in the cinema.

El-Ola participated in over ten films alongside Salah Zulfikar. She presented works that reached 120 films and 50 television series throughout her career, including the series Eny Rahela with Mahmoud Morsy, Laila Hamada and Mohamed El-Araby, and a series On the Sidelines of the Biography with Ahmed Mazhar, both of which were shown in the mid-seventies, and the series Bela Khatiaa and Zohoor W Ashwak with Salah Zulfikar, both of which were shown in the early-eighties.

On Mother's Day 21 March 2010, El-Ola was unable to attend the ceremony honoring her as an artist and mother in an event held by the Catholic Center under the title Day of Giving, due to her illness, which forced her to stay at home, and no one was able to represent her to receive the award. She was honored at home by giving her a shield in appreciation of her dedication over the years of her work. The shield was handed over to her by Father Boutros Daniel, in a kind human gesture. Zahret El-Ola suffered in her last days of paralysis until she died on the evening of Wednesday, 18 December 2013.

== Filmography ==
=== Film ===
- My Father Deceived Me (1951)
- Ana Bent Nas (1951)
- Colonialism falls (1952)
- Wedding Portrait (1952)
- Honorable Mr (1952)
- I Believe in God (1952)
- Faith (1952)
- Window to Heaven (1953)
- The Mistake of a Life (1953)
- Aisha (1953)
- The Path of Happiness (1953)
- My life partner (1953)
- Inferno of Jealousy (1953)
- After Farewell (1953)
- The Final Encounter (1953)
- One Night of My Life (1954)
- The Neighbor's Girl (1954)
- Bahbouh Effendi (1954)
- The Triumph of Love (1954)
- I Am Love (1954)
- The Unjust Angel (1954)
- The Money and the Boys (1954)
- The happiest days (1954)
- Have mercy on my tears (1954)
- Traces in the Sand (1954)
- The Kingdom of Women (1955)
- Captain Egypt (1955)
- Soul lover (1955)
- Our Good Days (1955)
- Amani Al Omr (1955)
- Dreams of Spring (1955)
- Call of Love (1956)
- Date Gram (1956)
- Confused Hearts (1956)
- My wife was murdered (1956)
- The call of the oppressed (1956)
- The Stranger (1956)
- Ismail Yassin in the Police (1956)
- Return My Heart (1957)
- The Road of Hope (1957)
- The Prisoner of Abu Zaabal (1957)
- Port Said (1957)
- The Empty Cushion (1957)
- Crime and Punishment (1957)
- Ismail Yassine in the Navy (1957)
- Nos Al-Layl Drivers (1958)
- Until We Meet (1958)
- Jamila, the Algerian (1958)
- Toha (1958)
- Abu Oyoun Jare’a (1958)
- The Secret of the Invisibility Cap (1959)
- Doaa Al-Karawan (1959)
- A Woman's Life (1959)
- I think of what I forgot (1959)
- The Unknown Woman (1959)
- Allahu Akbar (1959)
- The Last Love (1959)
- Ismail Yassin in Air Forces (1959)
- The River of Love (1960)
- Heartless Man (1960)
- Three Heiresses (1960)
- The Hobo Husband (1960)
- Holy Rabat (1960)
- There is a Man in our House (1961)
- Tomorrow Another Day (1961)
- Ashour Qalb al-Assad (1961)
- The Path of Heroes (1961)
- Husband by lease (1961)
- Me and My Daughters (1961)
- Warm Nights (1961)
- El Turguman (1961)
- The Oil King (1962)
- The Comic Society for Killing Wives (1962)
- I'm the Fugitive (1962)
- The Madmen in Bliss (1963)
- For Hanafi (1964)
- Bint Al-Hetta (1964)
- The Two Brothers (1965)
- The Lovers Weep (1966)
- Grams in August (1966)
- The Single Husband (1966)
- The second meeting (1967)
- The Six Watching Ones (1968)
- The Bravest Man in the World (1968)
- Ibn Al-Hetta (1968)
- Pickpocket Against His Nose (1969)
- The Three Madmen (1970)
- Sukkari (1973)
- The love that was (1973)
- Bloody Sunday (1975)
- Victims (1975)
- Al- Rida’ Al-Abyad (1975)
- For Life (1977)
- Prayer of the Oppressed (1977)
- Life is lost, my son (1978)
- The Lovers Railway (1978)
- Calculating the Years (1978)
- The Famous Case (1978)
- The best Days of my Life (1978)
- Sin of An Angel (1979)
- Fatwa al-Jabal (1980)
- The Stranger Brothers (1980)
- Lovers' Clash (1981)
- I'm Not Lying But I'm Beautifying (1981)
- I lost my love there (1982)
- Bus Driver (1982)
- A man in a women's prison (1982)
- I am not a thief (1983)
- Hadi Bady (1984)
- Street Angels (1985)
- Demon from honey (1985)
- Good People, Poor People (1986)
- Omar's Journey (1986)
- For whom the moon smiles (1986)
- I will leave you, Lord (1986)
- The Edge of the Sword (1986)
- Al-Ardah Al-Halji in a fraud case (1987)
- The daughter of the Pasha, the Minister (1988)
- Days of Terror (1988)
- An amazing story (1989)
- The Taming of the Man (1989)
- The Time of Al-Jadaan (1991)
- Couples in Trouble (1992)
- The Ship of Love and Torment (1993)
- Ard Ard (1998)

=== Television ===
==== Selected works ====
- Laqeeta (1976)
- Ala Hamesh El-Seera (1978)
- Bela Khatiaa (1980)
- Zohour W Ashwak (1983)
- Howa wa heya (1985)
- Al-Zawga Awel Man Yaalam (1987)
