= AlNamar Al'Aswad =

- النمر الأسود
- Directed by: Atef Salem
- Starring: Ahmed Zaki; Ahmed Mazhar; Wafa Salem
- Release date: 1984
- Country: Egypt
- Language: Arabic

The Black Tiger (Arabic: النمر الأسود, transliterated as El-Nemr El-Aswad) an Egyptian film released in 1984. The film is directed by Atef Salem and stars Ahmed Zaki, Ahmed Mazhar and Wafa Salem.

== Synopsis ==
The film tells the true story of an Egyptian Gastarbeiter (Mohamed Hassan al-Masry) who learns the carpentry trade from a young age and travels to ply it in Germany. His inability to speak German and even English leads to discrimination. To make things worse, he is bullied by a colleague over his dark skin, and the colleague succeeds in getting Mohamed's work visa revoked. He turns to a friend he made during his work abroad, an Egyptian Greek boxing coach, who trains the young man in the sport. Mohamed also meets and falls in love with a neighbor, but her father doesn't approve of her marrying a black man. They marry anyway, and he shakes up the industry with an improvement on the lathe that makes him a wealthy businessman in Germany.

The movie was filmed in the cities of Hanau, Maintal and Mülheim am Main in the state of Hesse in Germany.

== Mohamed Hassan al-Masry ==
The inspiration for the film was born in 1948 and was a professional boxer in Germany who won several titles and boxed for his adoptive country in Canada. He died in a tragic accident in 2014.

== Cast ==
- Ahmad Zaki as Muohammad hasan almasri
- Ahmad Mazhar as Costa
- Wafaa Salem as Helga
- Yusuf Fawzi as Birjir
- Ihsan Sharif as Mohammed's mother
- Ibrahim Qadry as Hassan, Mohammed's father
- Nabila Hassan as Zainab
- Muhamad alsayrafi as Helga's father
- Hussein Sherif as Medhat
- Fatima wajdi as Sahibat allahaf
- Mahmud Elwan as Elwan
- Mutawie Eways as Ramadan
