= The Final Encounter =

- اللقاء الأخير
- Directed by: El-Sayed Ziada
- Written by: Mahrous Ziada- (story); El-Sayed Ziada (screenplay and dialogue); or El-Sayed Ziada
- Produced by: El Sayed and Mahrous Ziada and Partners
- Starring: Badriya Raafat; Mohsen Sarhan; Zahrat El-Ola; Mahmoud el-Meliguy; Ferdoos Mohammed; Zeinat Sedki
- Cinematography: Bruno Salvi; Cello Cicivelli (exterior cinematography)
- Edited by: Ahmed Ismail
- Music by: Farid al-Atrash; Mohamed Ehsan; Ibrahim Hussein Darwish (composers); Omar El Gizawy; Doria Ahmed; Galal Sadiq (singers); Ahmed Mansour (lyricist)
- Production company: Studio Misr
- Distributed by: Aframusi Distribution
- Release date: June 1, 1953
- Running time: 100 minutes
- Country: Egypt
- Language: Egyptian Arabic

The Final Encounter (Arabic: اللقاء الأخير, transliterated as El-lekhaa el-akhir) is an Egyptian film released on June 1, 1953. The film is directed by El-Sayed Ziada, features a screenplay co-written with his brother Mahrous, and stars Baadriya Raafat (in her last cinema role), Emad Hamdy, Mohsen Sarhan, Zahrat El-Ola, Mahmoud el-Meliguy, and Zeinat Sedki. The story centers on a girl who elopes to marry a lover of whom her father does not approve, after which the lover goes missing in an accident and she thinks that he has died. Discovering that she is pregnant, the ostensible widow leaves the child in the care of a nurse and travels to Europe, only for the husband to return with amnesia.

== Cast ==
- Badriya Raafat (Nadia bint Hassanein)
- Emad Hamdy (Dr. Nabil, Nadia's attending physician)
- Mohsen Sarhan (Ezzat, Nadia's husband)
- Zahrat El-Ola (Zahra, a nurse)
- Mahmoud el-Meliguy (Hassanein, Nadia's father)
- Ferdoos Mohammed (Zainab, Nadia's aunt)
- Zeinat Sedki (hospital worker)
- Omar El Gizawy (Owais al-Tamarji)
- Hind Rostom (nurse)
- Mohamed Kamel (Muhammad)
- Ali Abdel Aal (clinic patient)
- Sayyed Suleiman
- Lotfy Abdel Hamid
- Mahmoud al-Rashidi
- Ibrahim Sami
- Abdel Mona'em Saoudi
- Nadia El Shennawy (young girl)
- Galal Sadiq (singing)
- Kaiti Voutsaki (dancing)
- Zeinat Olwi (dancing)

== Songs ==
Songs in score
Title	Lyricist	Singer
“يا قلبي غني” (“My Heart Is Rich”)	Ahmed Mansour	Doria Ahmed
“يارب” (“Ya Rabb” or “My Liege”)	Ahmed Mansour	Galal Sadiq
“يا زهرة في خيالي” (“Ya Zahra fi Khayali”)	Ahmed Mansour	Omar El Gizawy

Composers on the score include Farid al-Atrash, Mohamed Ehsan, Ibrahim Hussein Darwish, and Omar El Gizawy.

== Synopsis ==
The film's protagonist, Nadia (Badriya Raafat), falls in love with Ezzat (Mohsen Sarhan) against the wishes of her father Hassanein Mahmoud el-Meliguy), and the couple secretly marry, but Ezzat goes missing and is feared dead. Nadia falls into severe shock and is treated by Dr. Nabil (Emad Hamdy) and nurse Zahra (Zahrat El-Ola). Dr. Nabil falls in unrequited love with her, but she continues to cherish her late husband's memory. When Nadia discovers that she is pregnant, she travels with her aunt Zainab (Ferdoos Mohammed) and Zahra to give birth away from Hassanein and Dr. Nabil's watchful eyes. Nadia leaves her newborn Salwa to Zahra with a monthly salary to raise the child.

Four years later, Nadia travels with her father and aunt to Europe for her summer vacation, at which time Zahra and Salwa visit Dr. Nabil and the nurse's other hospital colleagues. Zahra discovers by chance that Ezzat has been treated for amnesia at the same hospital for the last four years. Nadia and her father and aunt return to the shocking news of Zahra's death and only learn of Salwa's fate when the aunt finds out that Dr. Nabil intends to place the girl in an orphanage the next morning. Nadia sneaks into the hospital at night to retrieve Salwa but is caught by a nurse and compelled to confess to Dr. Nabil in the morning. After agreeing to marry Dr. Nabil based on his promises to take good care of Salwa, Nadia sees her daughter playing in the hospital's garden with Ezzat, who sees a large wooden bar about to fall on Salwa's head all of a sudden. Ezzat takes the blow to protect his daughter, and the impact restores his memory such that all live happily ever after.
