= Hassan Khan (artist) =

Egyptian conceptual artist (born 1975)

- Born: London
- Education: American University in Cairo
- Occupation: visual arts

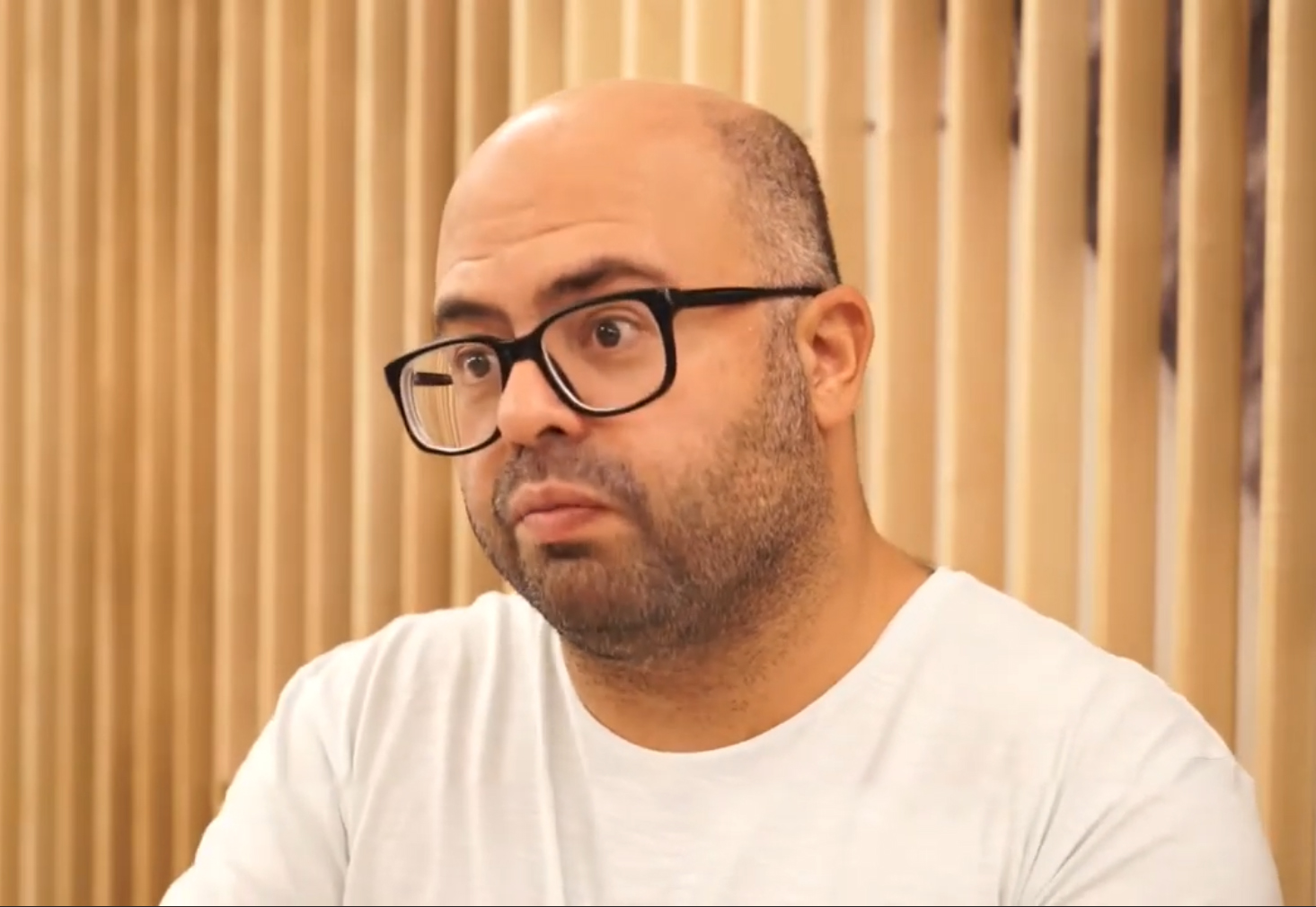
Hassan Khan at the 2017 Lo Shermo dell'arte Film Festival in Florence, Italy

Hassan Khan (born 1975) is a British-born Egyptian artist, musician, and writer. His work combines mediums of installation, electronic media, performance, sound, sculpture and video. His artistic practice explores constructions of cultural and social politics and their relations to art, particularly in the urban landscape. He resides and works in Cairo and Berlin.

== Biography ==
Khan was born in London, England in 1975, to Egyptian parents. His father, Mohamed Khan was a film director and producer. His mother, Zeinab Khalifa, is a silver smith and jewellery maker. His family moved to Cairo in his early childhood, where he was raised.

In 1990, at the age of 15, Khan was admitted into the American University in Cairo. He graduated with a BA and MA in English and comparative literature, in 1995 and 2004 respectively. His graduate research examines ethics and discourses of cultural history.

== Career ==
Khan practiced noise and electronic music through his undergraduate studies, collaborating and working with theatre director Ahmed El Attar. In his early career, he worked as a teacher and translator, as well as a magazine editor with Alive Magazine. He began making and showing short films in the mid-1990s. His work began to attain critical acclaim in the early 2000s, when he was awarded the Short Documentary Film Jury Award at the Ismailia International Film Festival for his film Transitions (2002). The film cuts between four distinct characters and lifestyles, which scholar Samirah Alkassim argues presents the city of Cairo as a space of shifting and conflicting identities.

Khan's video installation Reading the Surface: 100 faces, 6 locations and 25 questions was exhibited at Al Nitaq in 2001, art critic Yasmeen Siddiqui described Khan's Al Nitaq piece as "a discursive approach to installation that deconstructs authorship." The work utilizes documentary film techniques to explore the city and its power in forming culture and identity. The work takes up multiple rooms, presenting looping video screen, projected portraiture, and a microphone and reflected projection of the visitor, which Siddiqui described "served a specific function - to direct viewer's critical conception of themselves and others to society." Khan has described how theory, particularly the work of Michel Foucault on power, has been an influence on his work.

Khan's filmography and performance work continued with 17 and in AUC (2003), Conspiracy: Dialogue/Diatribe (2006/10) and The Dead Dog Speaks (2010), a series of works which scholar Tammer El-Sheikh argues questions activities of Egyptian social life and national narratives.

Some of Khan's international group exhibitions include the 8th Istanbul Biennial in 2003, the 15th Biennale of Sydney in 2006, the Documenta Biennale in Kassel, Germany, in 2012, and the Liverpool Biennial in 2014.

Solo exhibitions include The Keys to the Kingdom organized by the Museum Reina Sofia in Madrid, Spain, SALT Istanbul in 2012, Downtown Contemporary Arts Festival Cairo in 2014, and Blind Ambition at the Centre Pompidou in 2022.

As a writer, Khan published the manifesto The Violent Editor in his early 20s. Khan then published the book Twelve Clues in 2016, through Mousse Publishing.

In 2017 Khan won the Silver Lion for a Promising Young Artist at the 57th Venice Biennale for his piece Composition for a Public Park (2013/2017). Originally commissioned for La Nuit Blanche art festival in Paris, the piece is a music installation and composition that plays three different musical movements, which are experienced by moving through a park space. Scholar Marie Thérèse Abdelmessih argues how the piece augments the reality of the public park, in "an attempt at revisiting public space in order to de/construct systems of meaning seen as natural."

As of 2018, Khan is a professor of visual arts at the Städelschule in Frankfurt, Germany.

== Works ==
- The eye struck me and the lord of the throne saved me (1997), film.
- The Political Film (1998), video installation.
- Technicolor Mubarek (1998), video installation.
- Reading the surface: 100 faces, 6 locations and 25 questions (2001), installation for Al Nitaq.
- Transmissions (2002), film.
- Transitions (2002), film.
- Tabla Dubb (2002), live sound performance.
- 17 and in AUC (2003), film.
- DOM TAK TAK DOM TAK (2005), sound installation.
- G.R.A.H.A.M (2008), video installation.
- GBRL (2010), video installation.
- The Dead Dog Speaks (2010), film animation.
- Jewel (2010), film.
- Banque Bannister (2010), sculpture.
- The Twist (2012), sculpture.
- Studies for Structuralist Film No. 2 (2013), film.
- The Portrait is an Address (2016), mixed media.
- Composition for a Public Park (2013/2017), music installation.

== Discography ==
SUPERSTRUCTURE

- Released: March 1, 2019
- Label: The Vinyl Factory
- Tracks: A Short Story Based on a Distant Memory, SUPERSTRUCTURE (The Ammunition of the Nation)
