= Great Beans of China =

- Directed by: Sherif Arafa
- Story by: Sherif Arafa
- Produced by: Oskar - Al-Nasr - Al-Masa
- Starring: Mohamed Henedi
- Release date: August 8, 2004
- Country: Egypt
- Language: Arabic

Great Beans of China (Arabic: فول الصين العظيم) or Fool el Seen El Azeem is an Egyptian comedy film, directed by Sherif Arafa in 2004.

== Synopsis ==
Great Beans of China stars Mohamed Henedi as Mohyee El-Sharkawi: a young man with low grades, no job, and no life experience. El-Sharkawi is an innocent member of a family involved in illegal activities, who try to teach him to become like them. Through several failed attempts, he makes enemies who come after him. In an attempt to save him, his family sends him to China, to take the place of his stepfather in an international cooking competition.
