= Samah Anwar =

Egyptian actress (born 1965)

- Born: April 22, 1965 (age 61); Cairo, Egypt
- Occupation: Actress
- Known for: Secret Visit

Samah Anwar, (Arabic: سماح أنور) is an Egyptian actress born on April 22, 1965, in Cairo, Egypt. She appeared in the 1981 film Secret Visit.
