= Feyrouz =

Egyptian child actress (1943–2016)

- Born: Piruz Sarkis Artin Galfayan; 15 March 1943; Cairo, Kingdom of Egypt
- Died: 30 January 2016 (aged 72); Cairo, Egypt
- Occupations: Actress; entertainer
- Years active: 1950–1959
- Spouse: Badreddine Gamgoum (m. 1959; died 1992)
- Children: 2
- Relatives: Nelly (sister); Lebleba (cousin)

Piruz Sarkis Artin Galfayan (Egyptian Arabic: پيروز سركيس آرتين جالفايان; Armenian: Փիրուզ Սարգիս Արթին Գալֆայան; 15 March 1943 – 30 January 2016), known in Egypt as Feyrouz or Fayruz (فيروز), was an Egyptian film child actress.

== Biography ==
Piruz was born in Cairo in a family of Armenian descent on 15 March 1943. Her sister Nelly also entered the entertainment industry. She began her acting career very young, making her debut at the age of 7 in the 1950 film Yasmine. Egyptian director Anwar Wagdi was helpful to her in her career. She ultimately retired from acting at 15, in 1959, to wed comedian Badreddine Gamgoum (بدر الدين جمجوم). The couple had two children together, Iman and Ayman.

== Filmography ==
- 1950: Yasmin (ياسمين)
- 1951: Fayruz Hanem (فيروز هانم; Lady Fayruz)
- 1952: Elherman (الحرمان; Deprivation)
- 1952: Suret Elzefaf (صورة الزفاف; Wedding Photo)
- 1953: Dahab (دهب)
- 1955: Asafir Elganna (عصافير الجنه; The Sparrows of Paradise)
- 1957: Esmail Yasin Tarazan (اسماعيل ياسين طرزان)
- 1958: Ayyami Elsaida (أيامى السعيده; My Happy Days)
- 1958: Esmail Yasin lel Bie' (اسماعيل ياسين للبيع; Esmail Yasin for Sale)
- 1959: Bafakkar fi elli Nasini (بافكر فى اللى ناسينى; I'm Thinking in Who Is Forgetting Me)

== Awards ==
- In 2001, she was honored with a "Lifetime Achievement Award" at the Cairo Film Festival.
