= A Dinner Date =

A Dinner Date موعد على العشاء
- Directed by: Mohamed Khan
- Written by: Mohamed Khan
- Produced by: Al Gowhara Films
- Starring: Soad Hosny; Ahmed Zaki; Hussein Fahmy
- Music by: Kamal Bakry
- Release date: 1981
- Country: Egypt
- Language: Arabic

Maowid ala Ashaa (Arabic: موعد على العشاء; English: A Dinner Date) is a 1981 Egyptian romance film starring Soad Hosni, Ahmed Zaki. and Hussein Fahmy. The life story of a beautiful and pure woman, interested of the very little things with a great sensibility.

== Cast ==
- Souad Hosni as Nawal
- Ahmed Zaki as Shoukry
- Hussein Fahmy as Asaad
- Zouzou Madi as Nawal's mother

== Plot ==
This movie revolves around the story of an innocent girl (Nawal) who was married to a rich and possessive man who still wants her back after their divorce; however she meets a hair stylist (Shoukry) and falls in love with him. They get married but her first husband starts torturing Shoukry so he can leave Nawal but he refuses. Eventually, he is murdered by her first husband. So Nawal arranges a dinner date with her ex-husband telling him that she wants to get back to him and after they finish eating dinner, she tells him that she had put poison food and that both of them don't deserve to live after the death of the love of her life, Shoukry.

== Award ==
1981: Best Actress, Souad Hosni, by Egyptian Film Association. Egypt.

== See also ==
- Egyptian films of the 1980s
- List of Egyptian films of 1981
