= Hala Fouad =

Egyptian actress (1958–1993)

- هالة أحمد فؤاد
- Born: Hala Ahmed Fouad; March 26, 1958; Cairo, Egypt
- Died: May 10, 1993 (aged 35); Cairo, Egypt
- Education: Alexandria University
- Occupation: Actress
- Years active: 1960–1993
- Notable work: The Barefoot Millionaire
- Spouses: Ahmed Zaki; Ezzeddine Barakat
- Children: 2, including Haitham Ahmed Zaki

Hala Ahmed Fouad (Arabic: هالة أحمد فؤاد; 26 March 1958 – 10 May 1993) was an Egyptian film and television actress who predominantly worked in Egyptian cinema. She appeared in more than fifteen feature films notably El-Millionaira El-Hafya (1987) and Al Sadah Al Rejal (1987).

== Biography ==
She graduated from the faculty of Commerce in 1979. She worked in films in the 1980s having the chance to act alongside movie star Salah Zulfikar. Her father Ahmed Fouad was a filmmaker. She married veteran actor Ahmed Zaki in 1980. Her first son Haitham Ahmed Zaki was also a film actor who died on 7 November 2019. Later on, she married Ezzeddine Barakat and had another son, Rami.

Hala died on 10 May 1993, at the age of 35 after battling with breast cancer.

== Filmography ==
- Regal fi el Masyada (1971)
- Al Hedek Yefham (1985)
- Al Awbash (1985)
- El Millionaira El Hafya (1987)
- Al Sadah Al Rejal (1987)
- Ashwami (1987)
- Haret El Gohary (1987)

== See also ==
- List of Egyptian films of the 1980s
