= List of Egyptian films of 1953 =

A list of films produced in Egypt in 1953. For an A-Z list of films currently on Wikipedia, see Category:Egyptian films.

Title	Director	Cast	Genre	Notes
A`isha	Gamal Madkoor	Faten Hamama, Zaki Rostom	Drama	
Maw`ed Ma` al-Hayat (Appointment with Life)	Ezzel Dine Zulficar	Faten Hamama, Shukry Sarhan	Drama	
