= Mr Karate =

- Directed by: Mohamed Khan
- Written by: Raouf Tawfiq
- Starring: Ahmed Zaki; Ibrahim Nasr; Nahla Salama
- Cinematography: Kamal Abdel Aziz
- Edited by: Nadia Shoukry
- Release date: January 2, 1993
- Running time: 200 minutes
- Language: Egyptian Arabic

Mr Karate (Arabic: مستر كراتيه) is an Egyptian martial arts/action drama film directed by Mohamed Khan and released in 1993. It stars Ahmad Zaki. The film follows Salah (Zaki), a Cairo parking guard whose obsession with video-shop martial arts movies inspires him to learn karate and protect his community from corruption.

== Plot ==
Broke and unemployed, Zaki's character gets a stint as a garage worker before graduating to the more lucrative, albeit less dignified, profession of illicit parking helper (monadi).

After an acquaintance with a local retired karate instructor (played by Ibrahim Nasr), Zaki's character is introduced to the world of martial arts through watching a series of old Bruce Lee and Jackie Chan movies which, at first, are picked out by his new friend (Nasr's character) but which he then picks out himself from a nearby video rental store where his love interest in the movie works (played by Nahla Salama). What starts as a childish fascination, becomes with the help of Nasr, a new awakening for Zaki's character, who develops a resolve to become defenseless no more and trains in art of karate.

Soon, Zaki realizes that his newfound karate abilities allows him to help out distressed members in his community, which captures the attention of a local tycoon (who in the film remains obscure and whose exact profession - whether he is a businessman, member of parliament or even a minister - is left to the viewers' imagination).

== Cast ==
- Ahmed Zaki as Salah
- Ibrahim Nasr
- Nahla Salama
- Zouzou Nabil

== Reception ==
At the time of its release, the film received mixed reviews but it performed well in the box office and solidified Zaki as an icon and spokesperson for the average Egyptian youth. He would later be cast in a number of action film oriented roles during the mid-and late-1990s although he still mainly focused more on dramatic roles.

Andeel, from Mada Masr, found it as, "an amazing mixture of cultures and references [that] cooperate to produce the joy you receive watching it", and, as he enjoys Tarantino movies, "an earlier experiment in the same field". It is speculated that the misleading title for the film, which suggests that it is just a movie about martial arts, led to the lower ratings from reviewers.

In one of his last interviews (if not his last) before his untimely death in March 2005, Ahmad Zaki said the only thing he regretted about Mr Karate was its title. He said it was misleading because it led many moviegoers and critics to believe it was a lighthearted martial arts spoof, when, in fact, it was about the troubles of a simple man trying to survive the vast city that is Cairo, Egypt. In the interview, Zaki said he had hoped for the movie to be called Cairo '90.
