= Tarek El Shennawi =

Egyptian writer and film critic

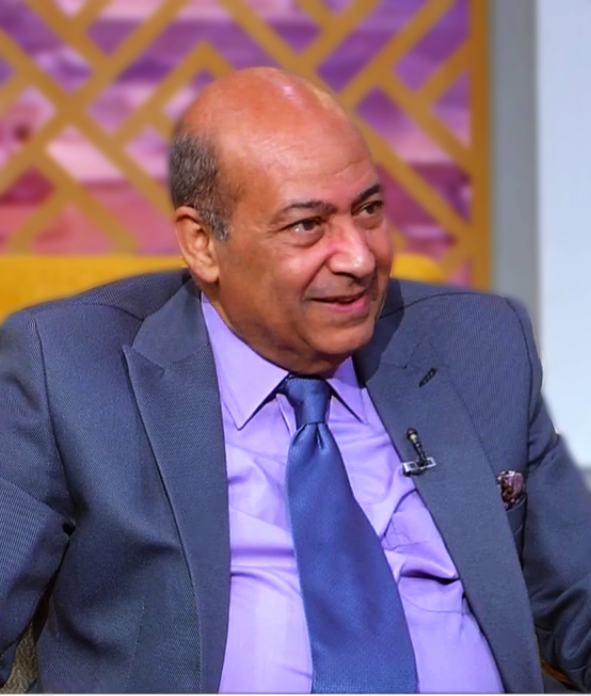
Tarek El Shennawi (2022)

Tarek El Shinnawi (sometimes spelled El Shennawi or Shennawy) (Arabic: طارق الشناوي) is an internationally recognised and renowned film critic and writer of Arab cinema. He is one of the most influential film critics of Arab cinema in the region, based in Cairo, Egypt. He writes in most of the top Arabic newspapers, magazines and websites for over 30 years, and has over 15 published books on Arab cinema various subjects. He also teaches the subject of film critique to the students in the final years of The Cairo university, faculty of Mass-communication. He has numerous cinematic participations in arbitration committees of International and Arab festivals. He has been frequently appointed as a jury member in Arab film festivals (as in the 12th Osian's-Cinefan Film Festival 2012, 9th Dubai International Film Festival 2012, 8th Abu Dhabi Film Festival 2014).

He has made calls for reform of the old-fashioned censorship regulations that disallow cinema and TV to impersonate the prophets. These regulations were made in 1926 when Youssef Wahbi desired to make a film depicting prophet Muhammad which was disallowed by Al-Azhar.

In 2022, it was announced that Tarek El-Shennawi would be honoured during the fourth edition of the Al-Ain Film Festival.

== See also ==
- List of Egyptians
