= Nelly (Egyptian entertainer) =

Egyptian entertainer (born 1951)

- نيللي
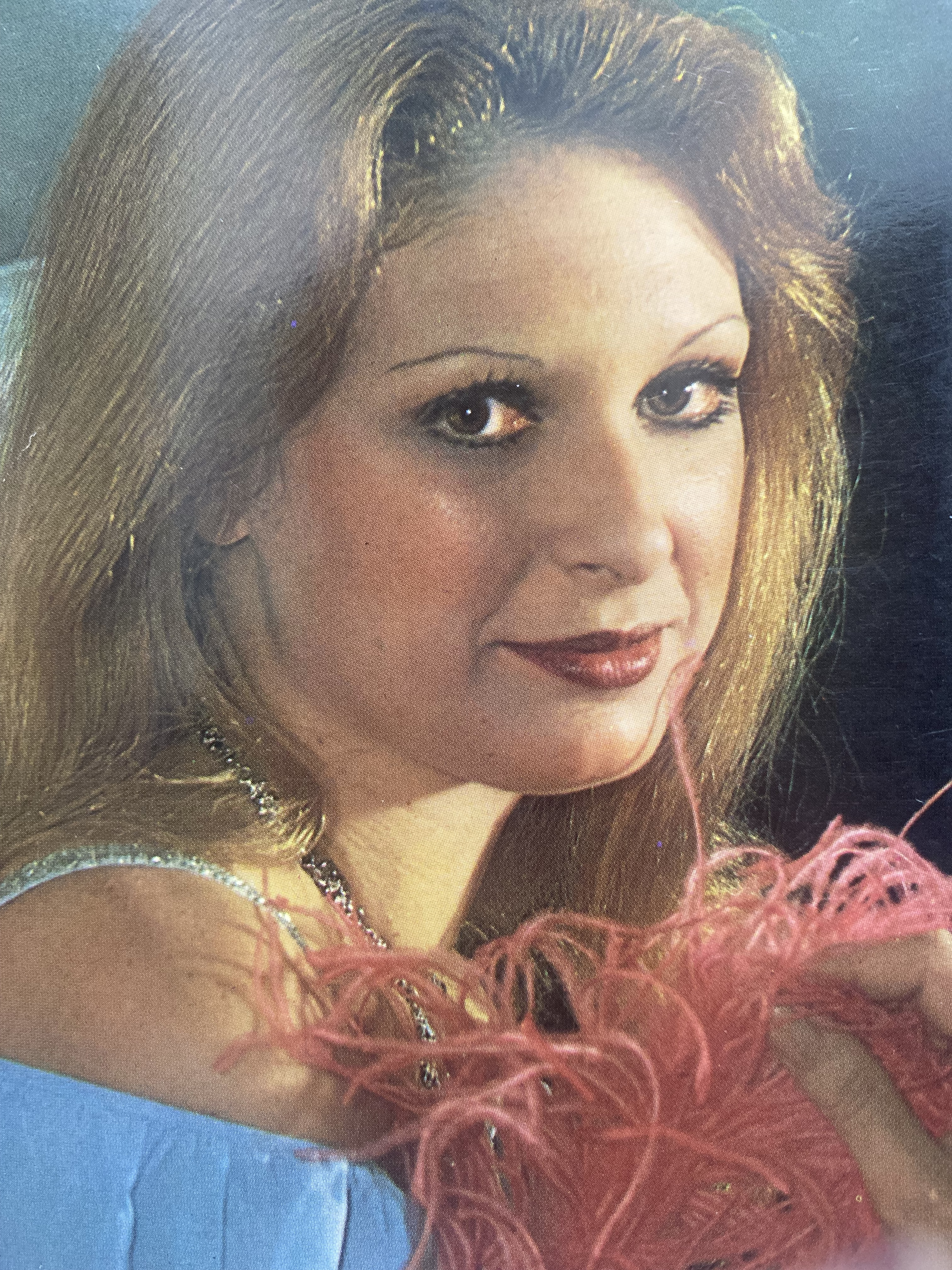
- Nelly in the 1970s
- Born: Nelly Artin Kalfayan; 3 January 1951 (age 75); Cairo, Kingdom of Egypt
- Occupations: Actress; singer; comedian; dancer; television personality
- Spouses: Houssam El-Din Mustafa (m. 1970; died 2000); Khaled Barakat (divorced)
- Relatives: Feyrouz (sister); Lebleba (cousin)
- Awards: Golden Pyramid

Nelly Artin Kalfayan (Arabic: نيللي آرتين كالفيان; Armenian: Նելլի Արթին Գալֆայան; born 3 January 1951), known mononymously as Nelly, is an Egyptian actress, singer, comedian, dancer, television personality, and all-around entertainer.

== Family background ==
Nelly was born in 1951 to an Armenian-Egyptian family in Cairo. She is the younger sister of Feyrouz, a well-known child actress, and a cousin of Lebleba, another well-known Egyptian film actress who is a little older than she is. Nelly was married to the Egyptian film director Houssam El-Din Mustafa and later on she got engaged to the musician Moody Elemam for a very short time. She later married Khaled Barakat (Egyptian businessman) and moved to London, then later divorced.

== Career ==
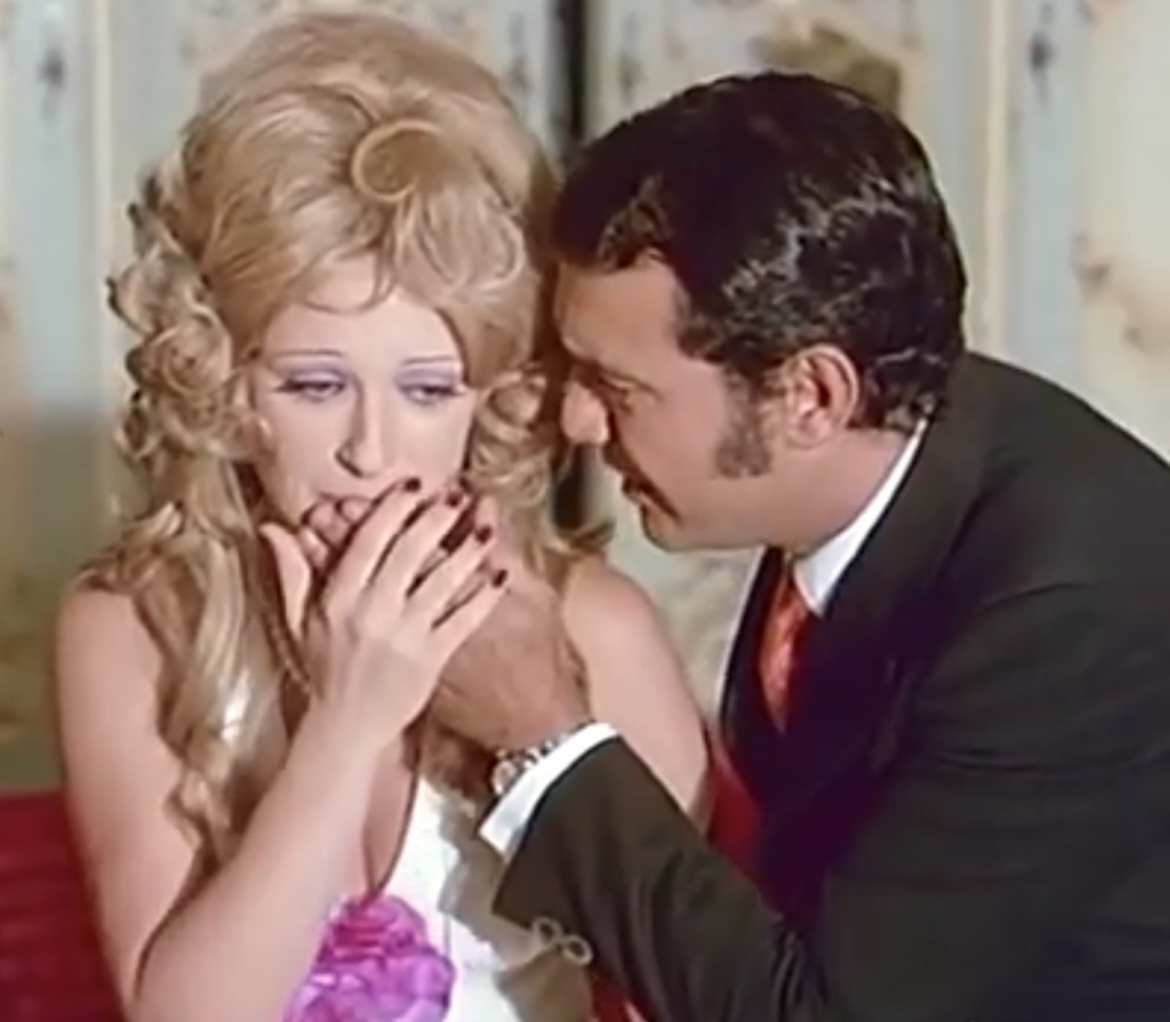
Nelly and Salah Zulfikar in Memory of a Night of Love (1973)

Her father was a film producer. and she started her career as a child actress, following the footsteps of her older sister, Feyrouz, who was a very famous child actress before her. She appeared in several movies as a child, including El Harman, Asafir El Gennah, Hati Naltaqi, and Tuba. She also took part in radio serials and the first one was Shi’ Men El Adhab with the greatest Mohammed Abdel Wahab and theatrical successes one with Farid Shawqi, El dalouaa. Her fame grew larger in 1966, at age 17, with the first film in which she had the lead role, Mahmoud Zulfikar's Al Murahiqa as Saghira. One of her most critically acclaimed roles was the secondary role she played in Al Azab Imra'a. She has more than 60 films to her credit. The majority of these are musicals, or films with a thread of plot and drama that is punctuated intermittently with song and dance. Most of them have a comic spirit. Nelly starred alongside the majority of Egyptian film stars, and from more than one generation. She acted in seven films alongside Salah Zulfikar, also acted in a number of straight melodrama TV series, most notably Bardis and Ad Dawwama.

=== Fawazir Nelly ===
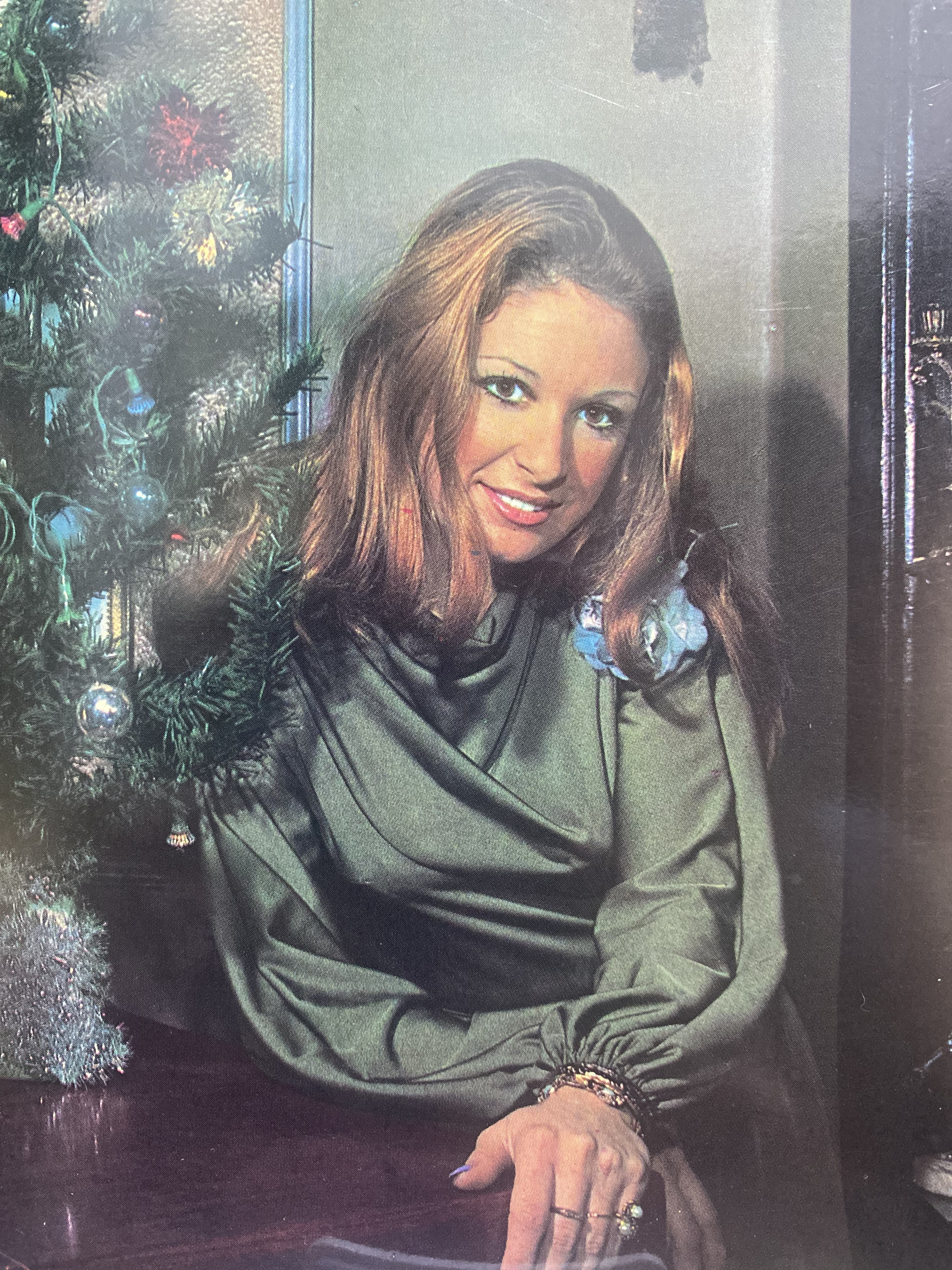
Nelly in the late 1970s

Of her large amount of artistic work, Nelly is best known throughout the Arab World for her Fawazir Ramadan (فوازير رمضان; translates as Ramadan puzzles), a set of TV comedy shows with much music and dancing, with Nelly the star of the shows. The hugely followed shows were broadcast to tens of major Arab television stations throughout the Arab World on a daily basis during the holy month of Ramadan, mixed with general entertainment segments. Each year's "fawazir" series was held together around a different organizing theme. The shows included: Fawazir Arusty (1980), Fawazir Al Khatbah (1981), Fawazir Alam Wareq (1990), Fawazir Sanduq El Dunya (1991), Fawazir Om El Oreaf (1992), Fawazir Dunya Laaba (1995), Fawazir Zay El Naharda (1996). Nelly's last fawazir was in 1996, but she did a show in the fawazir style called Alf Leila Wa Leila in 2001. Since then, Nelly has turned down a number of proposals to do another fawazir by reason of "a lack of fresh ideas".

=== Recent years ===
Nelly has largely retired from making films, comedy shows, and music, but she has been visible as a guest personality on a number of TV talk & entertainment programs. She also served as a judge in 2006 in The X Factor, XSeer Al Najah TV singing talent search show.

== Filmography ==
=== Theater ===
- El- Dalouaa (الدلوعة)
- Ouaa Taakar Damak (أوعى تعكر دمك )
- El-Eyal El Tayibin (العيال الطيبين)
- Cabareh (كابريه )
- Cinderella and el madah (سندريلا و المداح)
- Eyal el tayibin ( العيال الطيبين )
- El Donia Doulab (الدنيا دولاب )
- Inkilab (إنقلاب)
- Souk El Halawa (سوق الحلاوة)
- المدرسين و الدروس الخصوصية
- Madraset el muchaghibeen

=== Series ===
- (2002) ألو رابع مرة TV series
- الرمال الناعمة
- (2000) ألف ليلة وليلة TV series
- (1997) سنوات الشقاء والحب TV series
- حبيبي الذي لا أعرفه
- الدوامة
- المارد
- عاشت مرتين
- مبروك جالك ولد
- شيء من العذاب
- انها مجنونة مجنونة
- قصاقيص ورق

Movies

- Mekanika (Nancy / Rich spoiled heiress) (1993)
- Ana Wenty Wa Sa’at Alsafar (1985)
- قط الصحراء
- The Ghoul (1983)
- غابة من الرجال
- اللقاء المر
- الخاتم
- اتنين على الهوا
- حادث النصف متر
- مع تحياتي لأستاذي العزيز
- دندش
- A Moment of Weakness
- العاشقة
- Sin of an Angel (خطيئة ملاك) (1979)
- Al-azab emra aa (Inass) (1977)
- الوهم
- خطيئة ملاك
- شفاه لا تعرف الكذب
- عيب يا لولو .. يا لولو عيب
- إمرأة بلا قيد
- الإعتراف الأخير/Al eeteraf al akhir (1978)
- أهلا يا كابتن
- طائر الليل الحزين
- العذاب امرأة
- عذراء.. ولكن
- البنت الحلوة الكدابة
- الدموع في عيون ضاحكة
- شلة الأنس
- العاشقات
- الحساب يا مدموزيل
- صائد النساء
- نساء ضائعات
- إمرأتان
- الخاطئون
- سيدتي الجميلة/النشالة
- سؤال في الحب
- عايشين للحب
- غابة من السيقان
- قاع المدينة
- نساء للشتاء
- دنيا
- بنات للحب
- الشحات
- كلمة شرف
- نساء الليل
- Good Morning, My Dear Wife
- Memory of a Night of Love
- الحب والصمت
- شياطين البحر
- ملوك الشر
- شباب في عاصفة
- عصابة الشيطان
- مذكرات الآنسة منال
- غداً يعود الحب
- لا لا يا حبيبي
- My Husband's Wife
- مغامرة شباب
- Medinet al-Samt (1973)
- يوم واحد عسل
- مجرم تحت الاختبار/Mogrem that el-ekhtebar (Aziza) (1968)
- دلع البنات
- زوجة بلا رجل
- الحب سنة 70
- أسرار البنات
- الرجل الذي فقد ظله/El ragol el-lazi fakad zilloh (Samia Samy) (1968)
- نساء بلا غد
- اللص الظريف
- طائر الليل الحزين
- مذكرات الآنسة منال
- Ana al-Doctor (1968)
- Aguazet seif (1967)
- Beit el talibat (1967)
- Nora (1967)
- The Teddy Boys (المشاغبون) (1966)
- المراهقة الصغيرة (1966)
- هي والرجال
- التوبة (1958
- رحمة من السماء (1958)
- حتى نلتقي (1957)
- Birds of Paradise (عصافير الجنة) (1956)
- الحرمان (1953)

Radio Series

- شيء من العذاب
- سنة أولى حب
- رصاصة في القلب
- هيام و فارس الأحلام
- إمرأة في ورطة

=== TV Programs ===
- The X_Factor Xir El Hayat 2006
- Studio El_Fan 2003
- El_Janeb El Akhar
- Tarata Abdel Halim Hafez

== Awards ==
- Best secondary role in Al Azab Imra'a (العذاب إمرأة)
- Lifetime achievement award during the Alexandria International Film Festival in 1999
- Murex Excellence Awards in Lebanon 2008.
- Lifetime achievement Awards Cairo International Film Festival she owned Golden Pyramid Award
