= Houssam El-Din Mustafa =

Egyptian film director and screenwriter (1926–2000)

- حسام الدين مصطفى
- Born: May 5, 1926; Sayyidah Zainab, Cairo, Kingdom of Egypt
- Died: February 22, 2000 (aged 73); Cairo, Egypt
- Education: Higher Institute of Cinema
- Occupations: Film director; screenwriter
- Spouses: Nagat El-Sagheera (m. 1967; div. 1968); Nelly (m. 1970)

Houssam El-Din Mustafa or Hossam El-Din Mostafa (Arabic: حسام الدين مصطفى; May 5, 1926 – February 22, 2000) was an Egyptian film director and screenwriter.

Having graduated from the Higher Institute of Cinema in 1950, he travelled to the United States to study directing and returned to Cairo in 1956. He specialised in action films.
