= Kawther Ramzi =

Egyptian actress (1931-2018)

Kawthar Ramzi
- Born: 17 June 1931; Egypt
- Died: 2 September 2018 (aged 87)
- Occupation: Actress

Kawthar Ramzi (Arabic: كوثر رمزي) (17 June 1931 – 2 September 2018) was an Egyptian actress. She started her career in radio, then played small roles in cinema, theater and television. She was given a role closer to the tournament in the movie Call of Love.

== Biography ==
Kawthar was born on 17 June 1931, and her father was the artist Ibrahim Mohamed Fawzi, a theater heritage expert at the Institute of Dramatic Arts. She was married to the director of the security company Adco Pharmaceuticals, and did not have any children, and after his death at 21 years old, she completed her life with her brother Anwar Ramzi.

She debuted in 1954, and since then she participated in more than 70 films, including: Law kont rajol (1964), Nahr el hayat (1965), El hakiba el sawda (1964), El-Hob Fi Taba (1992), and TV series like Al-Suqout Fi Bir Sabe (1994-present), Yawmeat Wanees (1994-2013) and Ahlam El Fata El Tayer (2015-2016). She acted with actors like Adel Emam. Kawthar Ramzi received a certificate of appreciation from the late President Anwar Sadat.

Kawthar emerged strongly under the spotlight after the murder of her Tunisian friend, Thekra and remained the strongest witness in the case. On 28 November 2003, Kawthar was in the house of Thekra, when her husband, the businessman and artist Ayman El-Suwedi, expelled her from home in bad ways. The next day she learned that a few minutes later there was the murder that would end the life of her friend and Tunisian singer.

She died on 2 September 2018, at the age of 87 years, due to a sharp drop in blood circulation. Kawther suffered from paralysis of her leg and right hand due to a previous stroke.
