= Mohamed Henedi =

Egyptian artist (born 1965)

- محمد هنيدي
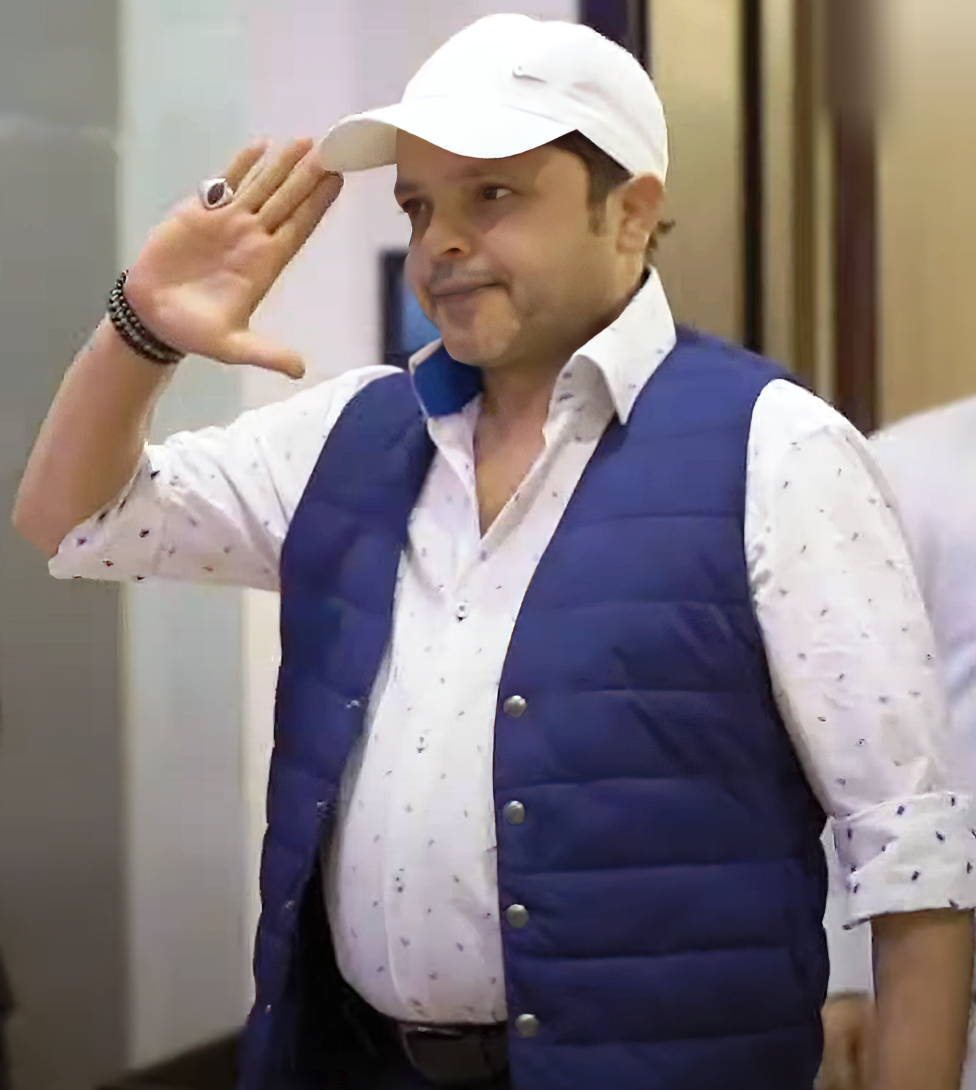
- Henedi in 2019
- Born: Mohamed Henedi Ahmed Abd Elgawwad; 1 February 1965 (age 61); Giza Governorate, Egypt
- Occupation: Actor
- Years active: 1978–present
- Children: 3

Mohamed Henedi Ahmed Abd Elgawwad (Arabic: محمد هنيدي أحمد عبد الجواد, pronounced [mæˈħæmmæd heˈneːdi ˈæħmæd]; born 1 February 1965) is an Egyptian actor from Giza. Yasmin Elrashidi of The Wall Street Journal said that Henedi was "considered the Robert De Niro of the Middle East."

== Career ==
After completing a bachelor's degree from a film institute, Henedi began his career with short appearances in theaters and cinemas.

A prominent figure in Egyptian comedy since the 1990s, Mohamed Henedy initially gained recognition through brief appearances in theatre and film before receiving wider acclaim for his more substantial roles in the 1997 films Ismailia Rayeh Gay and Al-Batal. Mohamed Henedy rose to stardom following the success of his breakthrough film Saidi Fi El-Gamaa El-Amrikiya (1998).

Following his rise to prominence, he starred in a series of successful films, including Hamam fi Amsterdam (1999), directed by Said Hamed; Belya we Demagho El-Alya (2000), directed by Nader Galal; and Saheb Sahbo (2002), in which he appeared alongside Ashraf Abdel-Baky.

Over the following two decades, Henedy established himself as one of the region’s leading comedic actors, appearing in numerous successful films, including Gaana Al-Bayan Al-Taly (2001), Askar fil Muaskar (2003), Foul El-Seen El-Azeem (2004), Ya Ana Ya Khalty (2005), Wesh Egram (2006), Andaleeb El-Dokki (2007), Ramadan Mabrouk Abou El-Alamin Hammouda (2008), Amir Al-Bahar (2009), Tita Rahiba (2012), and Yom Malosh Lazma (2015), among others.

Henedy has also appeared in several successful television series, including Ard El-Nefaq, one of his more recent works. His theatrical career includes popular plays such as Hazemny Ya, Alabanda, and Afrotto early in his career. After an absence of more than 15 years, he returned to the stage with Talat Ayam Fil Sahel in 2019.

He has also made a significant contribution to Egyptian dubbing, providing the voices of Timon in The Lion King, Mike Wazowski in Monsters, Inc., and Homer Simpson in the Egyptian versions of The Simpsons.

In the Joy Awards 2022 The Arab Ceremony Mohamed Henedi won the Favourite Actor award for the movie El Ens W El Nems.

In 2024, He was granted Saudi citizenship as an honorary tribute to him and his Egyptian art over the decades.

== Selected work ==
- Yom Morr w Yom Helw (1988)
- Eskendreyya Kaman w Kaman (Alexandria, again and forever) (1990)
- Sare' el-Farah (1994)
- Ziyaret El-Sayed El-Ra'is (1994)
- Bekhit w Adila(Bekhit and Adila) (1995)
- Bekhit w Adila 2(Bekhit and Adila)(1997)
- Esmailiyya Rayeh Gai (1997)
- Samaka W Arba Orush (1997)
- Se'idi Fi el Gam'a el Amrikiyya (1998)
- Hamam fi Amsterdam (1999)
- Belya W Demagho el 'Alya (2000)
- Ga'ana El Bayan El Tali (2001)
- Saheb Sahbo (2002)
- Askar fi el Mo'askar (2003)
- Great Beans of China (2004)
- Ya Ana Ya Khalti (2005)
- Weshsh Egram (2006)
- Andalib el Do'i (2008)
- Ramadan Mabruk Abel'alamen Hamoda (2008)
- Amir el Behar(Prince of the Seas) (2009)
- Mesyu Ramadan Mabruk (2011) (Mister Ramadan Mabruk)
- Teta Rahiba (2012) (Rauf)
- Trust! (2013) (T.V Show)
- Antar ebn ebn ebn ebn Shaddad (2017)
- The Knight and the Princess (2019) (Bakhtoo) (Animation)
- The humans and the mongoose (2021)
- Salam Merabaa (2021)
- Nabil el gamil dr. Tagmeel (2022)
- Mar3e el breemo (2023)
- El Gawahergy (2026)
