= Mamdouh Abdel-Alim =

Egyptian actor (1956–2016)

- ممدوح عبد العليم
- Born: 10 November 1956; Menoufia, Egypt
- Died: 5 January 2016 (aged 59); Cairo, Egypt
- Occupation: Actor
- Years active: 1970–2014

Mamdouh Abdel-Alim (Arabic: ممدوح عبد العليم; 10 November 1956 – 5 January 2016) was an Egyptian actor.

== Early career ==
His artistic career began as a child, performing in children's radio and television programming, schooled by director Inam Mohammed Ali. He then was schooled by Nour Eldemerdash, director, where he appeared as a small child in the series Paradise Virgin with actress Karima Mokhtar. He began his career in acting effectively in 1980, as a young man in the TV series Authentic along with Mokhtar, Dalia the Egyptian with actors Salah Zulfikar, Madiha Salem, and in 1983 began acting in cinema in the film The Virgin and The White Hair.

== Death ==
He died on 5 January 2016 during practice for sports exercises in gym of Gezira Sporting Club in Cairo, where he had a sudden heart attack and was taken to hospital and died there.
