= Ginza Musik =

Swedish mail order company

Ginza Musik AB (Ginza) is a Swedish mail order company that sells music, movies, and computer games.

The company was founded in 1968 when CEO Hans Haraldsson started selling vinyl records and music cassettes from his home. Since its founding, the company has been based in the small village of Fåglum about 75 km north east of Gothenburg.

Ginza Musik had 60 employees and a turnover of about 300 million SEK (€33 million) in 2004. In 2007, the company planned to start offering downloadable music over the Internet; however, in 2011 they reported that they would continue to focus on selling physical records, and that their sales figures of CDs and vinyl records were increasing.

In 2017, the company had 50 employees and processed 8,000–10,000 orders per week.

The name Ginza is taken from the 1966 song Ginza Lights by The Ventures.
