= Mohammed Al-Mansor =

Kuwaiti actor (born 1948)

Mohammed Al-Mansor محمد المنصور
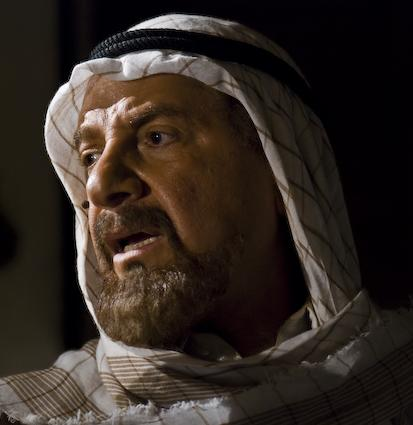
- Born: July 9, 1948 (age 77); Kuwait
- Occupation: Actor
- Years active: 1963-present

Mohammed Al-Mansor (Arabic: محمد المنصور; born July 9, 1948) is a Kuwaiti actor. He belongs to a family of actors.

== Acting work ==
=== Movies ===
- Bas Ya Bahr
- Al-Thiab la takal Al-Laham (English: Wolves do not eat meat)
- Talah Al-Samat (English: Shadows of silence)

He has been a host at local Television stations and other social media outlets.
