= Howa wa heya =

- Also known as: Him and Her
- هو و هي
- Written by: Sanaa Al Bisi; Salah Jahin
- Directed by: Yehia Al-Alamy
- Starring: Soad Hosny; Ahmed Zaki
- Composers: Kamal Al Taweel; Ammar El Sherei
- Original language: Egyptian Arabic

Production
- Production location: Egypt

Original release
- Release: 1985

Howa wa Heya, (“Him and Her”, “ هو و هي” ) is an Egyptian television drama, that aired for the first time during Ramadan in 1985. It featured many prominent contemporary artists in key roles, with movie stars Soad Hosni, in her sole television role, and Ahmed Zaki. The married couple drama, or dramas rather, were written by Sanaa al-Bisi and adapted by Salah Jahin into a screenplay in a rare anthology series in Egyptian television, where the same actors played different characters and storylines in each of its ten episodes. Hosni was awarded the Transtel (now part of Deutsche Welle) Prize at the African Union of Broadcasting conference in 1985 for her role in the series.

== Plots ==
Howa wa Heya is based on a series of short stories columnist Sanaa al-Bisi wrote in Al-Ahram in the early 1980s about a range of social issues couples faced. Each episode presented Hosni and Zaky as completely different couples: dating, married, divorced, former lovers, intersecting themes such as jealousy, house hunting, work, and family. Although 30 episodes were intended to be aired, as is the Egyptian television drama norm, conflicts between Hosni and director Yahia al-Alamy, saw only ten produced.

== Episodes ==
=== Episode 1: Pumpkin ===
Jalal suspects his wife who always incites his jealousy, but being weak in character, he cannot confront her. One day, he mysteriously disappears, and she goes on to search for him.

=== Episode 2: Your Wife Is Pregnant ===
Afaf is afraid that Midhat might get back with his ex-wife, so she decides to tie him up with a child. But when he gets promoted at his job and a new lady manager becomes in charge, Afaf gets jealous and uses her old trick. Now Afaf and Medhat have 6 kids.

=== Episode 3: The Fugitives ===
Following their marriage, Shawky and Noha spend all their time looking for an apartment, but to no avail. Having no other choice but to live with Noha's family, trouble finds its way to the life of the couple.

=== Episode 4:Traditional Outfits Party ===
When false news about Afifi's suicide spread, his wife decides to throw a party to prove the news false.

=== Episode 5: No, Doctor ===
Khaled returns from abroad and he tries to reconnect with his ex-sweetheart who left him and married a famous doctor. He claims he just wants them to be friends.

=== Episode 6: Thirst ===
Despite her mother's objection, Nesma marries Talaat who is much older than her. Nesma then finds herself in a critical situation when Nader returns from abroad and confesses his love for her.

=== Episode 7: Badria and Metwally ===
Metwally wants to marry Badria, but his financial situation holds him back. Badria's mother tries to wed her to another man who is financially better off.

=== Episode 8: Scorpion Sting ===
As Magdy's health deteriorates due to his anxiety and his excessive smoking, his wife starts to suspect him.

=== Episode 9: Recess Bell ===
Fate brings Mu'nes and Safia to work together at the same school after ten years of separation. However, their different mindsets and viewpoints trigger many issues and stand in the way of forming a musical band at school.

=== Episode 10: My Wealthy Uncle ===
Headmaster Mahrous decides to take his wife to Cairo, partially to see her doctor, and partially to visit her wealthy uncle.

== Cast ==
- Souad Hosni as Heya
- Ahmed Zaki as Howa
- Tahiya Karioka
- Hassan Abdeen
- Zahret El Ola
- Mohsen Sarhan
- Mahmoud El Gendy
- Ahmed Bedir

== See also ==
- List of Egyptian television series
