= Giza (surname) =

Giza or Giża is a Polish surname that originated as a nickname literally meaning pork or beef hind leg. Archaic feminine forms: Gizina (by husband), Gizanka (by father). Notable people with the surname include:

- Abelard Giza (born 1980), Polish comedian, writer, filmmaker, and actor
- Barbara Giza (1550–1589), Polish mistress
- Hanna Maria Giza (born 1948), Polish radio journalist, film and stage actress
- Jakub Giża (born 1985), Polish shot putter
- Piotr Giza (born 1980), Polish footballer
