= Mohamed Khan =

Egyptian director and actor

- Born: Mohamed Hamed Hassan Khan; 26 October 1942; Cairo, Egypt
- Died: July 26, 2016 (aged 73); Cairo, Egypt
- Citizenship: Egyptian; British
- Education: London Film School
- Years active: 1963–2016
- Spouse: Wessam Soliman
- Children: 2

Mohamed Hamed Hassan Khan (Arabic: محمد حامد حسن خان pronounced [mæˈħæmmæd ˈħæːmed ˈħæsæn xæːn]; 26 October 1942 – 26 July 2016) was an Egyptian film director, screenwriter, and actor. His main aesthetic credo, in line with directors from his generation, was a reinvigorated realism seeking direct documentation of everyday life in Cairo, beyond the walls of the studio. Khan has 4 films in the Top 100 Egyptian films list.

He was a pivotal member of the "1980s generation" in Egyptian cinema, along with directors such as Khairy Beshara, Daoud Abd El-Sayed, Atef El-Tayeb, and Yousry Nasrallah.

== Biography ==
Khan was born on 26 October 1942 in Cairo, Egypt to an Egyptian mother, and a British father from what is now Pakistan. After completing his high school education in Egypt, he went on to study at the London School of Film Technique (now known as The London International Film School) between 1962 and 1963. He directed several 8mm films. In 1963, he returned to Egypt and worked in the script department of the General Egyptian Film Organization. Between 1964 and 1966, he worked as an assistant director in Lebanon. He then he moved again to England, where he wrote his book "An Introduction to the Egyptian Cinema", published by Informatics in 1969. he edited another book entitled “Outline of Czechoslovakian Cinema”, which was also published by Informatics in 1971.

His 1983 film The Street Player was entered into the 13th Moscow International Film Festival. According to a book issued by the Bibliotheca Alexandrina in December 2007, Khan's Ahlam Hind we Kamilia (1988) is one of the 100 landmarks in the history of the Egyptian cinema.

He has one daughter, Nadine, a film director, and one son, Hassan Khan, an artist and musician. He was married twice first to Zeinab Khalifa, a well known Egyptian jeweller and then to Wessam Soliman, an Egyptian scenarist who wrote three of his movies: Banat Wust el-Balad (Downtown Girls), Fi-Sha'et Masr el-Guedida (In a Heliopolis Apartment), and Fatat el-Masna' (The Factory Girl).

== Filmography, screening and prizes ==
Short Films

- Da'e (1963) (a.k.a. Lost)
- Al Haram (1964) (a.k.a. The Pyramid)
- Al Battikha (1972) (a.k.a. The Watermelon). Screened at Adelaide and Oberhausen film festivals in 1973.
- Leqa' a'ely (1983) (a.k.a. A meeting of the Family)
- Al Sebaq Al Tawil (1989) (a.k.a. The Long Race)
- Yoam Fi Hayat Ossra Sa'eeda (1990) (a.k.a. A Day in the Life of a Happy Family)
- Al Alameyya (Sakhr) (1993)
- Ahlam layssat Mostahila (1995) (a.k.a. Feasible Dreams)
- Al Mar'a Al Messreyya (a.k.a. The Egyptian Woman)
- Atfal Al Shaware' (a.k.a. Street Kids)
- Al Bait Al Kabir (a.k.a. The Family House)

Feature Films

- Darbet shams (1978) Screened at Montreal World Film Festival in 1979. Cidalec Golden Award for first film at the Alexandria Film Festival in 1979. First Film Award at the Egyptian Film Society Festival in 1979. Certificate of Merrit for Direction from the Egyptian Ministry of Culture in 1981.
- El Raghba (1980) (a.k.a. Desire)
- Al Tha'r (1980) (a.k.a. The Vengeance)
- Ta'er ala el tariq (1981) (a.k.a. A Bird on the Road). Screened at Montreal, Sorento, Tashkent, Karlovy Vary Film Festivals in 1981 and 1982. Jury Award at the Egyptian Film Society Festival in 1982.
- Maw'id ala asha' (1981) (a.k.a. A Dinner Appointment)
- Nos Arnab (1982) (a.k.a. Half a Million)
- El Harrif (1983) (a.k.a. The Artful). Screened at the Moscow, Berlin, Valencia Film Festivals in 1983 and 1984. Best Direction at the Egyptian Film Society Festival in 1985.
- Kharaga wa lam ya'ud (1984) (a.k.a. Gone and Never Came Back). Silver Award at the Carthage Film Festival in 1984.
- Moshwar Omar (1986) (a.k.a. Omar's Journey). Screened at the Strasbourg, Valencia Film Festivals. Screened at the Tashkent, Strasbourg, Paris Arab Film Festivals in 1986 and 1987.
- Youssef and Zeinab (1986) (Egypt/Maldives Co-Production). Screened at the Strasbourg and Moscow Film Festivals in 1986 and 1987.
- Awdat Mowatin (1986) (a.k.a. Return of a Citizen). Screened out of Competition at the 1987 Cannes Film Festival. Screened at the Montreal, Valencia, Bastia, Montpellier and Paris Arab Film Festivals between 1987, 1990 and 1991.
- Zawgat Ragol Mohim (1987) (a.k.a. The Wife of an Important Man). Silver Award at the Damascus Film Festival in 1987. Screened In Competition at the 15th Moscow International Film Festival in 1987. Screened at the Montreal, Valencia, Tetouan, Digne, Istanbul and Nantes Film Festivals in 1987 and 1988.
- Ahlam Hind we Kamilia (1988) (a.k.a. Dreams of Hind and Camilia). Bronze Award at the Valencia Film Fest in 1988. Best Direction from Egyptian Film Society Festival in 1989. Best Film from the Catholic Film Centre in Cairo in 1989. Screened at the Tashkent, Carthage, Bahrain, Nantes and Tetouan Film Festivals, between 1989 and 1995.
- Supermarket (1990) Best Direction from the Egyptian Film Society Festival in 1991. Best Film from the Egyptian National Film Festivals in 1991. Screened at the Munich and Montpellier Festivals, in 1991.
- Fares Al Madina (1991) (a.k.a. Knight of the City). Screened at the Valencia and Paris Arab Film Festivals in 1992.
- Al Ghar'ana (1992) Screened at the Rotterdam Film Festival in 1993.
- Mr Karate (1993)
- Youm har giddan (1994) (a.k.a. A Very Hot Day)
- Ayyam El Sadat (2001) (a.k.a. Days of Sadat)
- Klephty (2003)
- Banat west albalad (2005) (a.k.a. Downtown Girls)
- Fi shaket Masr El Gedeeda (2007) (a.k.a. In the Heliopolis Flat)
- Fataat El Masnaa (2014) (a.k.a. Factory Girl)
- Before the Summer Crowds (2016) (قبل زحمة الصيف)

== See also ==
- Henry Barakat
- Mahmoud Zulfikar
- Kamal El Sheikh
