= Ammar El Sherei =

Egyptian musical artist (1948–2012)

- Born: Ammar Ali Mohamed Ibrahim Ali El Sherei; 16 April 1948; Samalut, Minya, Kingdom of Egypt
- Died: 7 December 2012 (aged 64) Cairo, Egypt
- Instruments: Organ, Piano, Accordion
- Years active: 1970–2012

Ammar Ali Mohamed Ibrahim Ali Al Sherei (Arabic: عمار علي محمد إبراهيم علي الشريعي) or more commonly known as Ammar El Sherei (16 April 1948 – 7 December 2012) was an Egyptian music icon, performer and composer.

== Early life and education ==
Sherei was born blind on 16 April 1948 in the village of Samalot, 25 km from Minya in Upper Egypt, to a large family of Al Shereis. His father was the mayor of the village. His paternal grandfather was Muhammad Pasha Al Sherei, a member of the Parliament of Egypt during King Fouad I's reign, and his maternal grandfather was Mourad Al Sherei who was one of the companions of Saad Zaghloul during the revolution of 1919. His eldest brother, Muhammad Ali Muhammad Al Sherei, was the Egyptian ambassador to Australia. His family moved to Cairo when he was five years old. There he attended the Demonstration Centre for the Rehabilitation and Training of the Blind (DCRTB). He studied the English language and literature at the Faculty of Arts of Ain Shams University and graduated in 1970. He continued his studies in the US and in Britain. He attended the Royal Academy of Music in London. He also received three PhDs, including one from the Sorbonne in France.

== Career ==
After graduation, Sherei worked as an accordion musician. He performed in Cairo's nightclubs and then in the Golden Music Band that was a famous band at that time in Egypt. He became a composer in 1975. He played piano, harp, keyboard and oud. Sherei arranged and wrote soundtracks and scores for movies, television series and soap operas. His notable television series include; The Return of the Spirit (1977), Howa wa heya (1985) and Raafat El Hagan (1988-1990). He was also host of a radio and television show, A Diver in A Sea of Tunes. He composed more than 150 songs for most of the leading music stars of the Arab World, including Warda, Latifa and Ali El Haggar. He was also an assistant professor at the Academy of Arts.

== Personal life ==
Sherei married at the age of 43. He had a son.

== Death and funeral ==
Sherei died of heart failure at the age of 64 at Cairo's Al Safa Hospital on 7 December 2012. His funeral was organized on the night of 10 December 2012 in Al Rahman Al Rehim mosque in Cairo with the attendance of several high-profile figures, government officials and artists.
