= Athar El-Hakim =

Egyptian actress

- Born: 24 August 1958 (age 68); Cairo, Egypt
- Education: Ain Shams University
- Occupation: Actress
- Years active: 1976–2009

Athar El-Hakim (Arabic: آثار الحكيم) (born on 24 August 1958) is an Egyptian actress.

She began her career in television in the 1970s and became widely known through her roles in Egyptian films and television series during the 1980s and 1990s. Her notable films include The Tiger and the Female, Bird on the Road, Love on the Pyramids Plateau, and A Paper Hero. Her television work includes Layali al-Helmiya and Zizinia.

== Early life ==
Athar El-Hakim was born in Cairo, Egypt, on 24 August 1958. She studied English at the Faculty of Arts at Ain Shams University. After graduation, she worked in public relations at a hotel before pursuing a career in acting.

== Career ==
=== Early roles ===
El-Hakim began working in television in the mid-1970s. Her early appearances included the television series Bila Eitab (1976). Her first film appearance was in Al-Mala'een (1979).

=== Film and television success ===
El-Hakim rose to prominence during the 1980s, appearing in a number of Egyptian films. Among her notable performances were roles in Bird on the Road (1981), I'm Not Lying, But I'm Beautifying (1981), The Kingdom of Hallucination (1983), Ayoub (1983), The Tiger and the Female (1987), and A Paper Hero (1988).

She also appeared in several television productions. Her television credits included Layali al-Helmiya, in which she appeared in its second and third seasons, and the first season of Zizinia (1997). Other television appearances included We Do Not Sow Thorns, Taming the Wildcat, and Escaping from Love.

During the 1990s, El-Hakim continued to work in both cinema and television. Her film appearances included Searching for Sayyid Marzouk (1991), Police Devils (1992), Pursuit in the Forbidden (1993), and The Truth Is Called Salem (1994).

Her later screen credits included the films My Beloved, Who Could It Be? (2000) and Anbar and the Colors (2001), as well as television productions such as Friska (2004), Sea Lanterns (2005), and The Tightened String (2009).

=== Retirement ===
El-Hakim stopped appearing in acting roles after the television series The Tightened String in 2009. In January 2022, she publicly confirmed that she had retired from acting and from media appearances. She explained that she had become satisfied with her career and no longer wished to remain in the public spotlight.

In a 2026 interview, she reiterated that she had retired from acting and discussed her reasons for leaving the entertainment industry.

== Filmography ==
=== Films ===
Year	Film
1979	Al-Mala'een
1979	The Killer Who Killed No One
1980	The Stranger Brothers
1981	Bird on the Road
1981	Dangerous Relationship
1981	I'm Not Lying, But I'm Beautifying
1981	Secret Visit
1982	Who Will Put Out the Fire?
1983	Ayoub
1983	The Kingdom of Hallucination
1984	The Fox and the Grapes
1984	The Poor Do Not Enter Heaven
1985	The Palm
1985	Street Angels
1985	The Lawful Wins
1986	Love Above the Pyramid Plateau
1986	Poor but Happy
1986	The Last Scene
1986	Melodies
1987	The Tiger and the Female
1987	The Butcher
1987	The Man from Upper Egypt
1987	Conqueror of Time
1988	A Paper Hero
1988	A Bird in the Sky
1989	Junk
1990	The Last Game
1990	The Translator's Huts
1991	Searching for Sayyid Marzouk
1991	The Mischievous Girls and the Captain
1991	The Law of Ika
1991	Midnight Sergeant
1991	The Game of the Wicked
1992	Police Devils
1993	Pursuit in the Forbidden
1994	The Truth Is Called Salem
1995	We Are the Children of Today
1997	After a Painful Accident
1998	Hard Work
2000	My Beloved, Who Could It Be?
2001	Anbar and the Colors

=== Television ===
- Bila Eitab (1976)
- My Dear Children, Thank You (1979)
- Siam Siam (1980)
- Until Love Suffocates (1983)
- Dream Journey (1986)
- Love and Other Things (1986)
- Al-Zenkelouni (1987)
- Layali al-Helmiya (1989–1990)
- Cain and Abel (1990)
- Zizinia (1997)
- We Do Not Sow Thorns (1998)
- Escaping from Love (2000)
- Friska (2004)
- Sea Lanterns (2005)
- Love After Deliberation (2006)
- The Tightened String (2009)
