= List of Egyptian films of 1961 =

A list of films produced in Egypt in 1961. For an A-Z list of films currently on Wikipedia, see Category:Egyptian films.

Title	Director	Cast	Genre	Notes
Rendezvous with the Past (Maww’ed Ma’ Al-Madi)	Mahmoud Zulfikar	Salah Zulfikar, Mariam Fakhr Eddine	Drama	
Masters' Love (Gharam El Assayiad)	Ramses Naguib	Lobna Abdel Aziz, Ahmed Mazhar, Omar Sharif, Shwikar		
The Sun Will Never Set (La Tutf'e al-Shams)	Salah Abu Seif	Faten Hamama, Imad Hamdi, Nadia Lutfi, Shukry Sarhan	Drama	
I Will Not Confess (Lan Aataref)	Kamal El Sheikh	Faten Hamama, Ahmed Mazhar, Ahmed Ramzy	Crime	
Teenagers (El Morahekat)	Ahmed Diaa Eddine	Magda, Rushdy Abaza	Romantic comedy	Entered into the 11th Berlin International Film Festival
Oh Islam (Wa Islamah)	Enrico Bomba, Andrew Marton	Ahmed Mazhar, Lobna Abdel Aziz, Rushdy Abaza, Hussein Riad	Historical	
A Storm of Love (A'sefa Min Al-Hubb)	Hussein el-Mohandess	Salah Zulfikar, Nahed Sherif	Romance, Drama	
Wonderful Memories (Ma' Al Zikrayat)	Saad Arafa	Ahmed Mazhar, Nadia Lutfi,	Romance, Thriller, Drama	
The Mute (Al Kharsaa)	Hassan El Imam	Samira Ahmed, Fakher Father, Zouzou Nabil	Crime, Drama	
Why I'm Living (Lemaza A’yesh)	Ibrahim Omara	Shukry Sarhan, Soad Hosny, Mohsen Sarhan, Zouzou Nabil	Thriller, Action	
Under the Sky of the City (Taht Samaa' Al Madina)	Hussein Helmy El Mohandes	Eman, Kamal el-Shennawi, Hussein Riad	Drama	
My Life is the Price (Hayati Hya El Thaman)	Hassan El Imam	Huda Sultan, Ahmed Mazhar, Hussein Riad	Drama	
Shore of Love (Shaty’ El Hobb)	Henry Barakat	Farid El Atrash, Samira Ahmed, Taheyya Kariokka	Drama	
That’s What Love Is (El Hub Keda)	Mahmoud Zulfikar	Salah Zulfikar, Sabah	Romantic comedy	
The Route of Tears (Tareek El Demou’)	Helmy Halim	Kamal el-Shennawi, Sabah, Laila Fawzi	Drama	
Me and My Daughters (Ana we Banaty)	Hussein Helmy El Mohandes	Salah Zulfikar, Nahed Sherif, Zaki Rostom	Drama	
Ismail Yassine in Prison (Ismail Yassine Fi El Segn)	Hasan El-Saifi	Ismail Yassine, Maha Sabry, Tawfik El Deken	Comedy, Crime	
The Seven Daughters (El Sabaa’ Banat)	Atef Salem	Soad Hosny, Nadia Lutfi, Ahmed Ramzy	Romance, Drama	
Temple of Love (Ma’bad El Hob)	Atef Salem	Sabah, Emad Hamdy, Youssef Fakhr Eddine		
A Pearl Among Women (Set El Banat)	Hossam El Din Mostafa	Hend Rostom, Rushdy Abaza, Abdel Moneim Ibrahim |		
Zizette	Sayed Eissa	Yehia Chahine, Berlanty Abdel Hamid, Mahmoud El-Meliguy		
The Old Adolescent (Al Moraheq Al Kabeer)	Mahmoud Zulfikar	Hend Rostom, Emad Hamdy, Youssef Fakhr Eddine, Zizi El Badrawi	Drama	
Ashour the Lionhearted (Ashour Qalb Al Assad)	Hussein Fawzy	Taheyya Kariokka, Rushdy Abaza, Abdel Salam Al Nabulsy	Comedy	
Don't Remember Me (La Tazkoriny)	Mahmoud Zulfikar	Shadia, Emad Hamdy, Hussein Riad	Drama	
The Swindler (Al Nassab)	Niazi Mostafa	Farid Shawky, Nagwa Fouad Ayda Hilal, Mahmoud El-Meliguy		
The Schoolgirl (Al Telmiza)	Hassan El Imam	Shadia, Hassan Youssef Amina Rizk	Drama	
Blood on the Nile (Dimaa’ Ala El Nil)	Niazi Mostafa	Hend Rostom, Farid Shawki, Amina Rizk	Drama, Thriller	
The Interpreter (El Torgman)	Hasan El-Saifi	Ismail Yassine, Zahrat El-Ola, Nagwa Fouad	Comedy	
Struggle in the Mountain (Siraa’ Fi El Gabal)	Hossam El Din Mostafa	Rushdy Abaza, Berlanty Abdel Hamid, Mahmoud El-Meliguy	Comedy	
There is a Man in our House (Fi Bitona Ragol)	Henry Barakat	Zubaida Tharwat, Omar Shariff, Rushdy Abaza	Drama	
Haa’ 3	Abbas Kamel	Rushdy Abaza, Soad Hosny	Drama	
The Dim Light (Al Doo’ Al Khafet)	Fatin Abdel Wahab	Ahmed Mazhar, Soad Hosny, Shwikar		
There's no Understanding (Mafish Tafahom)	Atef Salem	Soad Hosny, Hassan Youssef	Comedy	
My Wife's Husband (Goz Meraty)	Niazi Mostafa	Sabah, Farid Shawky, Omar El Hariry	Drama, Crime	
A Day of my life (Yom men Omry)	Atef Salem	Abdel Halim Hafez, Zubaida Tharwat, Abdel Salam Al Nabulsy		
Fattouma	Hasan El-Saifi	Hend Rostom, Kamal El Shennawy, Mahmoud El-Meliguy		
A Man in my Life (Ragol Fi Hayaty)	Youssef Chahine	Shoukry Sarhan, Samira Ahmed, Tawfik El Deken		
