= List of Egyptian films of 1962 =

A list of films produced in Egypt in 1962. For an A-Z list of films currently on Wikipedia, see Category:Egyptian films.

Title	Director	Cast	Genre	Notes
Beware of Eve (Ah Min Hawaa)	Fatin Abdel Wahab	Lobna Abdel Aziz, Rushdy Abaza, Hussein Riyad	Comedy	Adapted from Shakespeare's Taming of the Shrew
The Cursed Palace (Al Qasr Al Mal’oon)	Hassan Reda	Salah Zulfikar, Mariam Fakhr Eddine	Horror	
Chased by the Dogs (El Less wal Kilab)	Kamal El Sheikh	Shukry Sarhan, Shadia, Kamal Al-Shennawi	Crime, Drama	Entered into the 13th Berlin International Film Festival
Wife Number 13 (El Zawga 13)	Fatin Abdel Wahab	Shadia, Rushdy Abaza	Comedy	Entered into the 12th Berlin International Film Festival
A Date at the Tower (Maww'ed fi Al Borg)	Ezz el din Zulfikar	Salah Zulfikar, Soad Hosny, Fouad el-Mohandes	Drama	
The Judge of Love (Qady El 3'aram)	Hasan El-Saifi	Nadia Lutfi, Hassan Youssef, Abdel Salam Al Nabulsiy		
Letter from an Unknown Woman (Ressala min Imraa Maghoula)	Salah Abu Seif	Farid al-Atrash, Lobna Abdel Aziz, Amina Rizk, Mary Monib,	Drama	
I am the fugitive (Ana El-Hareb)	Niazi Mostafa	Farid Shawqi, Zahret El Ola, Mahmoud Morsy, Salah Mansour	Drama	
The Comic Society for Killing Wives (Gamaeyat Qatl el-Zawgaat el-Hazleya)	Hasan El-Saifi	Salah Zulfikar, Zahrat El-Ola	Comedy	
Schoolgirl's diaries (Mozakerat Telmiza)	Ahmed Diaa Eldin	Nadia Lutfi, Ahmed Ramzy, Hassan Youssef		
The Three Musketeers (Al Forsan Al Thalatha)	Fatin Abdel Wahab	Ismail Yassine, Mahmoud el-Meliguy, Abdel Salam Al Nabulsy	Comedy	
Last Chance (Akher Forsa)	Niazi Mostafa	Farid Shawqi, Shwikar, Mahmoud el-Meliguy	Drama	
The Sins (Al Khataya)	Hassan al-Imam	Abdel Halim Hafez, Nadia Lutfi, Hassan Youssef	Drama	
Without a Date (Mn 3'eir Mi'ad)	Ahmed Diaa Eldin	Soad Hosny, Nadia Lutfi, Moharam Fouad	Romance	
Chains of Silk (Salasel mn Harir)	Henry Barakat	Madiha Yousryi, Moharam Fouad, Emad Hamdy	Drama	
Shafiqa The Copt (Shafiqa El Keptia)	Hassan al-Imam	Hind Rostom, Hassan Youssef, Fouad el-Mohandes	Biography, Drama	
The Black Suitcase (Al Hakiba Al Souda')	Hasan El-Saifi	Shoukry Sarhan, Naima Akef, Mahmoud El-Meliguy	Drama	
Struggle of Giants (Siraa' El Gababera)	Zuhair Bakir	Ahmed Mazhar, Nadia Lutfi, Youssef Fakhr Eddine	Action, Drama	
Struggle of the Heroes (Sira' El Abtaal)	Tawfiq Saleh	Shoukry Sarhan, Samira Ahmed, Salah Nazmi	Drama	
King of Petroleum (Malik El Petrol)	Hasan El-Saifi	Ismail Yassine, Zahret El Ola, Abdel Moneim Ibrahim, Istifan Rosty	Comedy	
Between Two Mansions (Bein El Qasrein)	Hassan al-Imam	Yehia Chahine, Maha Sabry, Salah Qabeel, Abdel Moneim Ibrahim	Drama	
Woman in a Whirl (Emraa Fi Dawama)	Mahmoud Zulfikar	Shadia, Emad Hamdy, Ahmed Ramzy	Drama	
The Miracle (Al Moa'giza)	Hassan Al-Imam	Faten Hamama, Shadia, Hussein Riad	Drama	
The Black Candles (Al Shumue Sawda)	Ezz el din Zulfikar	Najat Al Saghira, Saleh Selim, Amina Rizk	Drama, Romance	
Olive Branch (Ghosn El Zaytoun)	El Sayed Bedir	Ahmed Mazhar, Souad Hosny, Omar El Hariri	Drama, Romance	
Almaz and Abdo El Hamouly	Helmy Rafla	Warda, Shoukry Sarhan, Adel Mamoun	Biography, Drama	
A Day Without Tomorrow (Youm Bela Ghad)	Henry Barakat	Farid al-Atrash, Mariam Fakhr Eddine, Zaki Rostom	Drama	
