= List of Egyptian films of 1958 =

A list of films produced in Egypt in 1958. For an A-Z list of films currently on Wikipedia, see Category:Egyptian films.

Title	Director	Cast	Genre	Notes
Al-Tareeq al-Masdood (The Barred Road)	Salah Abouseif	Faten Hamama, Ahmed Mazhar, Shukry Sarhan	Drama	
Bab El Hadid (Cairo Station, The Iron Gate)	Youssef Chahine	Hind Rostom, Farid Shawki, Youssef Chahine	Drama	Entered into the 8th Berlin International Film Festival
Sayyidat al-Qasr (Lady of the Castle)	Kamal El Sheikh	Faten Hamama, Omar Sharif	Drama	
Gameela (Jamila, the Algerian)	Youssef Chahine	Magda, Salah Zulfikar, Ahmed Mazhar	Historical	
Al-Zawjah al-Azra' (The Virgin Wife)	El Sayed Bedeir	Faten Hamama, Ahmed Mazhar, Emad Hamdy	Drama	
