= Qays wa Laila =

- Directed by: Ahmed Diaa Eddine
- Starring: Shoukry Sarhan; Magda al-Sabahi; Omar el-Hariri; Mahmoud El-Sabbaa; Mohamed Tawfik; Widad Hamdi; Mohammed Abaza; Rafeaa El Shal; Nagwa Fouad; Abbas Fares
- Release date: January 18, 1960
- Country: Egypt

Qays wa Laila (Arabic: قيس وليلى, lit. “Qays and Laila”) is an Egyptian film released in 1960.

The film is the second film of the same name (a remake of the 1939 film of the same name) based on the story of Layla and Majnun. Majnun is the name rendered in most transliterations of the semi-legendary poet Qays ibn al-Mulawwah. Like the film it remade, it features a screenplay co-written by El-Sayed Ziada. The only actor in common is Abbas Fares.

== Synopsis ==
The poet Qays ibn al-Mulawwah (Shoukry Sarhan) falls in love with his cousin Laila (Magda al-Sabahi) and writes love poems to her. Although the tribal elders forbid him to meet her and she later marries Warid (Omar El-Hariri), Qays remains in love with her.
