= Allah maana =

- الله معنا
- Directed by: Ahmed Badrakhan
- Written by: Ihsan Abdel Quddous
- Edited by: Emile Bahri
- Music by: Medhat Assem
- Production company: Studio Misr
- Release date: November 14, 1955
- Running time: 110
- Country: Egypt
- Language: Arabic

Allah maana (Arabic: الله معنا, lit. “God Is on Our Side”) is an Egyptian film released in 1955. Premiering on November 14 of that year, it was directed by Ahmed Badrakhan with a screenplay co-written by him and Ihsan Abdel Quddous and an all-star cast including Faten Hamama, Emad Hamdy, Magda al-Sabahi, and Mahmoud el-Meliguy. The film was censored to the point of almost preventing release, according to film critic and historian Aly Abou Shadi, over the portrayal of 1952 coup leader Mohammed Naguib. It was saved by Gamal Abdel Nasser’s approval, underlined by his attending the premiere at the Rivoli Cinema.

== Synopsis ==
After the Israeli Declaration of Independence in 1948, the Egyptian army prepares to invade and starts a draft. Yuzbashi (captain Ahmed Jamal (Emad Hamdy) enlists at the behest of his cousin Nadia (Faten Hamama) despite offers by his rich uncle Abdel Aziz Pasha (Mahmoud el-Meliguy) to help get out of it. Ahmed finds shoddy imported ordinance and bands together with fellow officers to reveal the true sources of the corruption. Abdel Aziz Pasha is no help as the main arms dealer, and King Farouk and his chief of staff Madkour Pasha (Hussein Riad are in firm control of all political forces, including the executive, the Parliament, the Army, the National Police, and the ruling and opposition parties the powers that be keep squabbling with one another. The Free Officers reach out to Shahid Pasha, the opposition leader (Ahmed Allam), but the latter was dissuaded by Madkour's threats from helping. A journalist named Mohsen (Shoukry Sarhan) raises the issue in his newspaper and brings it to Parliament's attention, earning the representatives who bring it up dismissal. Belly dancer Sonia Sharbat Amira Amir, entertainer of royalty, reveals Abdel Aziz Pasha as the culprit for the faulty weapons to Mohsen and warns of an impending Navy shipment, so Ahmed, Mohsen, and Nadia sneak into Abdel Aziz's (her father) treasury to reprint the damning publications. The Pasha betrays his nephew to the Police, who tried as they had before with Mohsen to assassinate Ahmed and then to arrest the group, but the Revolution's July 1952 outbreak stops them and the King is expelled with his six-month-old son Fuad II, all parties dissolved, and the corrupt arrested. Abdel Aziz Pasha is killed trying to throw a hand grenade at his pursuers, since said grenade explodes prematurely.

== Controversy ==
As soon as editing began, President Gamal Abdel Nasser heard the rumor that Mohammed Naguib's role in the July 23 Revolution would be highlighted. He had it suspended for two years, but director Ihsan Abdel Quddous asked Nasser to wait to watch to make up his mind. The local entertainment blotter Rose al-Yūsuf reported in 1955 that the President had agreed on condition that scenes with Naguib played by Zaki Tulaimat by deleted, ultimately showing up to the premiere in person. The film was also rumored to be banned for fear of public sympathy for King Farouk.

== Staff ==
Story: Ihsan Abdel Quddous Dialogue: Sami Daoud Direction and screenplay: Ahmed Badrakhan Production company: Studio Misr Cast:

- Faten Hamama
- Emad Hamdy
- Magda al-Sabahi
- Mahmoud el-Meliguy
- Hussein Riad
- Alwiya Gamil
- Seraj Munir
- Amira Amir
- Shoukry Sarhan
- Sayed Abu Bakr
- Stephan Rosti
- Ahmed Allam
- Othman Abaza
- Widad Hamdi
- Mohamed Al-Toukhi
- Muhammad Alwan
- Mahmoud Ismail
- Samiha Ayoub
- Mohammad Attia
- Mai Medawar
- Adly Kasseb
- Malak El Gamal
- Zaki Ibrahim
- Amina Sharif
- Fatima Al-Selhadar
- Mona Fouad
- Lola Abdo
- Lys and Lyn Gamal
- Rashad Hamed
- Anwar Zaki
- Abdel Halim Khattab
- Mutawa Owais
- Said Khalil
- Aly Reda
- Mohamed Sobeih
- Ahmed Loxer
- Hermine
- Ellen Diato
- Gomaa Edriss
- Fahmy Omar
- Abbas Al-Dali
- Fouad el-Mohandes
- Shaladimo
- Abdel Mona'em Saoudi
- Mahmoud El-Sabbaa
- Toson Moatamed
- Ibrahim Hechmat
- Lotfi Al-Hakim
- Mahmoud Azmy
- Hussein Azar
