= Teenagers (film) =

1961 film

- Directed by: Ahmed Diaa Eddine
- Written by: Ali El Zorkani
- Produced by: Magda
- Starring: Magda; Rushdy Abaza
- Cinematography: Wadeed Serry
- Edited by: Saeed El-Sheikh
- Music by: Andre Ryder
- Production company: Magda Film
- Distributed by: Magda Film
- Release date: 1961
- Running time: 105 minutes
- Country: United Arab Republic (Note: Egypt and Syria were briefly united as a single political entity during the time this film was released.)
- Language: Egyptian Arabic

Teenagers (Arabic: المراهقات, El morahekate) is a 1961 Egyptian drama film directed by Ahmed Diaeddin. It stars Magda and Rushdy Abaza. The film was produced by Magda for Magda Film and was released on December 5, 1960 by Magda Film.

The film was selected as the Egyptian entry for Best Foreign Language Film at the 33rd Academy Awards, but was not accepted as a final nominee.

== Plot ==
The film deals with suppressed Egyptian teenagers who come from different backgrounds. It focuses on the lives of three teenagers who go to the same high school. Nada (Magda) comes from a high class, wealthy family. She lives in a mansion with her mother, brother and grandfather. The brother became the head of the family after the death of her father. He is a womanizer who spends money on his women, alcohol and drugs. Nada is 16 years old, very beautiful and innocent. She has never experienced true love before. She is not allowed to go out by herself. Her only freedom is when she meets her friends at school and they talk with each other. Nada’s best friend is Amina. Amina is the complete opposite of Nada in ever way and comes from a very poor family. She is 16 years old and lives with her mother, stepfather and stepbrother. Her stepfather is a very mean old man and is frequently drunk; he gives them a daily lecture that he is wasting money on his children, especially his son Ahmed who is in college. Ahmed found peace at home because of his stepmother and stepsister who he loved very much. The third teenager, Huda, comes from a well-off family and likes to party every night and skip school to meet boys with the knowledge of her mother and father who believe that they are giving her freedom in life.

Huda invites Nada to her birthday party, but Nada cannot mention it to her mother because she is not allowed to go out anywhere other than school; she eventually concocts a lie for her mother, telling her mother that her best friend is sick and in the hospital and that she wants to go with their maid to visit her. At the party she meets a man named Issam (Rushdy Abaza), a very handsome military pilot. They fall for each other and slow dance for an hour. Nada comes back home and tells her grandfather. Issam wants to marry Nada but her brother refuses because the family wants her to marry her cousin. Nada’s best friend Amina dies while pregnant with her stepbrother's son after her stepfather forces her to take pills to abort the baby.

After Nada discovers her best friend’s death, she has a nervous break down, made worse because Issam leaves the country on a mission after Nada’s brother refuses him. She becomes sick and even tries to commit suicide. Later her brother feels hurt and goes to locate Issam and bring him to marry her.

== Cast ==
- Magda as Nada
- Rushdy Abaza as Issam
- Zizi Mustafa as Safia
- Dawlat Abiad as Nada's mother
- Hussein Riad as Refaat, Nada's grandfather
- Adly Kasseb as Shaker
- Nadia Al-Naqrashi as Sanaa
- Naima Wasfy as School principal
- Omar Zolfakar as Tarek
- Aziza Helmy as Nafisa
- Mohamed Abaza as Dr. Hazem

== Awards and nominations ==
The film was nominated for a Golden Bear at the 11th Berlin International Film Festival.

== See also ==
- List of Egyptian films of 1961
- List of Egyptian films of the 1960s
- List of submissions to the 33rd Academy Awards for Best Foreign Language Film
- List of Egyptian submissions for the Academy Award for Best Foreign Language Film
