= El Tholathy El Mareh =

Egyptian Pop band

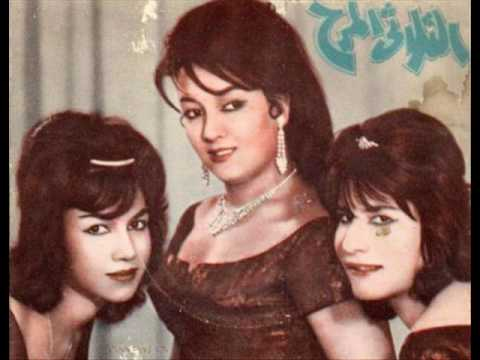
- Members from left to right: Wafaa Mustafa; Safaa Lotfy; Sanaa El Barouni

Background information
- Origin: Cairo, Egypt
- Genres: Egyptian, Arabic Pop Music
- Years active: 1958–1967
- Members: Wafaa Mustafa; Safaa Lotfy; Sanaa El Barouni

El Tholathy El Mareh (Arabic: الثلاثي المرح) is a famous Egyptian Musical band, which appeared in the fifties of the twentieth century, and was distinguished by its social works that suited all levels regardless of their differences.

== History and formation ==
The band Al-Thulathi Al-Marah presented a new style of singing that was admired and accepted by the audience, and their songs are still available to this day.

Their songs were distinguished by being suitable for Egyptian occasions, even on a personal level, such as Egyptian weddings, birthdays, and social occasions such as the month of Ramadan.

The fame of the funny trio was further enhanced by participating in several shows in collaboration with the Reda Show Troupe.

The funny trio mourned many poets of that beautiful era such as Salah Jahin, Morsi Gamil Aziz, Saleh Goudat, and Abdel Fattah Mustafa. Many of the creators of that era composed for them, such as Ali Ismail who appeared in them, as well as Sayed Makkawi, Mohamed El Mougy, Helmy Bakr, Abdel Azim Mohamed, Helmy Amin, Munir Murad, Ahmed Sedky, Abdel Azim Abdel Haq, and from the compositions of the musician Mohamed Abdel Wahab, the trio participated in singing in the musical piece "The Mamluks".

== Band members ==
The band consisted of;

- Wafaa Mohamed Mustafa.
- Safaa Youssef Lotfy.
- Sanaa El Barouni, sister of Sohair El Barouni.

They are graduates of the Institute of Arabic Music.

== History ==
They started to appear through amateur programs that were presented by the Egyptian Radio at that time to introduce new voices and give the opportunity to appear and introduce the audience and the great composers and writers to them. At first, Sanaa and Safaa started as a beautiful duo and worked together for a short period in the garden of the Music Institute where they studied. After that, they met Wafaa, who joined them to be the best trio in singing of this type of singing that they excelled in. From here came the idea to form a joint band that brought them together, as the composer Ali Ismail heard them and admired them and adopted them and called them (the Merry Trio). He is considered the one who composed this new style for them the most in the world of singing.

She presented the first paragraph of many concerts, as she always creates an atmosphere of joy and optimism in the concerts she participates in, especially the singing concerts and Ramadan nights that the radio revives, and the late President Gamal Abdel Nasser listened to them more than once during these evenings.

The biggest dream for any singer was to have their voice reach listeners through the radio, so Wafaa, Safaa and Sanaa applied to the radio listening committee to obtain a singing license, under the name (The Merry Trio), which is the first time this type of singing has appeared.

== Brilliance ==
Most of the singing trios that appeared in Egypt were not successful and retired early because they were imitations and copies of the Merry Trio band, and the Merry Trio remained at the forefront and achieved successive successes. The band was dissolved after these years of success, but the trio will remainLathi Al Marah is remembered as the first to present this wonderful type of singing with a fun voice and a distinctive, fun performance that cannot be forgotten to this day.

== Stopping and retirement ==
The members of the trio decided to retire while they were at the peak of their brilliance and fame, not because of a disagreement between them, but because of marriage. Wafaa went to work in teaching and then moved to an Arab country to work. As for Sanaa, she married the late great director Hassan Al Imam and preferred family stability. Safaa also married director Sami Abu Al Nour. Despite their cessation of continuing their artistic work, a strong friendship remained between them.

== Works ==
Many musical bands used them and sang with them in several concerts at universities and at weddings.

They participated in presenting many concerts in many Arab countries such as Iraq, where they sang several tunes in the Iraqi dialect, the most famous of which is the song "The Happiest Day" by the late Iraqi composer Reda Ali. Also, from the Libyan heritage, the band sang "Ya El Enab", "Ya Sagheer Fi Sagheerna" and "Taal Yabouna" recorded in Lebanon from the Libyan heritage. In the early seventies, the fun trio visited Jordan and gave a private concert, which was recorded in the Jordanian TV studios and included most of their beautiful songs.

They participated with the brown nightingale Abdel Halim Hafez in the movie (A Day of My Life) in the song (Laughter, Play, Seriousness and Love) with the artist Abdel Salam Al Nabulsi and the artist Zubaida Tharwat. Although their names were not mentioned in the introduction to the movie, they added an atmosphere of vitality and fun to the song and the viewers really liked them.

They performed the song (Television) in the introduction to the movie (Young for Love) by Souad Hosni in the mid-sixties.

They participated in the (City Lights) concerts where the stage would be filled with applause when the announcer announced, live on air, the start of the (Fun Trio) segment. The merry trio was distinguished by the beautiful voice of each of its members, each one of them had a beautiful voice and this was confirmed by everyone who listened to them in private and family sessions, when Wafaa was humming Fairuz's songs and Safaa was reviving Asmahan's songs and Sanaa was singing Souad Mohamed's songs.

== Songs ==
The merry trio was able to present many types of singing such as operettas, holiday songs such as Eid al-Fitr, Eid al-Adha, Mother's Day (they also sang for the father), Egyptian Radio Day, folk, rural, emotional songs, morning songs, children's songs, wedding songs, patriotic songs, religious songs, songs related to the historical connection between Egypt and Sudan, and songs for various occasions such as the occasion of signing the unity between Egypt and Syria, the anniversary of the July 1952 Revolution, and the occasion of building the High Dam. The following are 88 songs from the most beautiful short songs presented in Arabic singing.

- Wahwi ya Wahwi
- Ramadan rosary
- Is it coming, boys?
- The threshold is a cutter
- Why is the sea laughing?
- You are not my imagination, my boy
- The sweetness of our sun
- Oh brown, my sugar
- My beautiful mother
- Rejoice, my girls
- Here are scissors and here are scissors
- Is the crescent moon of fasting
- On the light of the eye
- If it weren't for your greetings
- Hamada Hamada
- Welcome
- Lolly
- The swing is swinging
- Why is the sea laughing?
- Rock candy
- Joy has come to us
- Three newlyweds have come to us
- Either a bride or a groom
- Oh our bride, peeled almonds
- A smile.. a word.. a share
- Open your heart to me
- Happy, my love
- Three years I have known you
- Ah, from love, ah
- Go away, my love
- The older we get, the more beautiful we become
- When you are pleased, you find the world roses
- We are the three doctors of the heart
- Our brother is love
- Take your hand off your cheek
- Oh you who walks on the path of the beautiful
- Oh moon that reached the house
- Oh moon, you are high
- Oh dark-skinned, you are sugar
- Oh dark-skinned, you are crucified
- I will change my phone
- Enough, we are too old for chocolate
- Long live Egypt
- Beautiful, my country, you are a bride with a veil
- Oh, our countrymen
- Oh, our neighborhood boys
- Sherbet of unity
- Peace, teacher
- A year has passed and a year has come
- The joy is here
- We were and we remained
- Oh, people of Sudan
- Warm up, my boats, by Sudan
- Oh, joy that was not on my mind
- Oh, my congratulations with my dearest hopes
- I am building the High Dam
- Oh, joy that was not on my mind
- Oh, my congratulations with my dearest hopes
- I am building the High Dam
- Oh, morning, may your morning be happy
- The planting of the Sharqi
- Good morning, you rising sun
- The voice of the nightingale
- The bird chirped
- Who wakes me up the bird
- The full moon
- Wake up, rose
- "Pomegranate of the Gardens" operetta
- "Dar Al Hana" operetta
- Oh Mama.. Oh My Mama
- Oh Dad, listen to us
- Oh Dad, come
- My love is working every day
- A word of work
- Hope and work
- Our evening is beautiful tonight
- The silver jubilee
- A round cake with a lit candle
- The Eid dress
- "Adi's" taste
- He made me happy with his beauty
- Who is like me
- By your life, Dad, and our Dina Al Qanater
- Today is Eid, don't you think
- Your lights have shone, how beautiful they are, Eid
- Eid joys
- Every year, you are in peace

To the credit of Egyptian TV, it has re-presented the Ramadan songs of the merry trio, in the style of cartoon films while preserving the old tune, allowing current generations to listen to these Ramadan songs, which have remained among the most distinctive Ramadan songs in the stage The Sixties and Beyond.
