= Eskendrella Band =

Eskenderella Band was formed in 2000 by Hazem Shahine with the aim of reviving the songs of Sheikh Imam and Sayed Darwish. In 2005, after a two-year hiatus, the band announced its return with new members in the line-up. The band found its identity in the 2011 Egyptian Revolution. Their songs are inspired by the poets Fouad Haddad and Salah Jahin, as well as the son and grandson of Fouad Haddad, Amin and Ahmad Haddad. Amin and his son write about the changes taking place in contemporary Egypt – themes which dominate the band's new album. The band members include the children and grandchildren of these two poets.

== 2011 Revolution ==
The band members were among the protesters in Tahrir Square and composed and performed new songs about the revolution among the masses that had gathered in the square. They have also traveled widely across Egypt performing songs such as “Rag‘ein” (We are Coming Back), and “Safha Gedida” (A New Chapter). In the early days of the revolution they produced an operetta, entitled “Hikayat Thawra” (Story of a Revolution), narrating and singing the verses of Ahmad Haddad on the new revolution. The band's music has documented the various phases of the revolution. Their songs comment on the socio-political realities that the people face.

== See also ==
- Music of Egypt
- Protest song
- Arab Spring
