= The Thief and the Dogs =

1961 novel by Naguib Mahfouz

- Author: Naguib Mahfouz
- Original title: اللص والكلاب
- Language: Egyptian Arabic
- Subject: Existentialism; Surrealism
- Genre: Novel
- Publisher: Misr Library
- Publication date: 1961
- Publication place: Egypt
- Media type: Print (Paperback)
- Pages: 143
- Preceded by: Children of Gebelawi (1959)
- Followed by: Autumn Quail (1962)

The Thief and the Dogs (Arabic: اللص والكلاب; al-liṣ wal-kilāb) is one of the Egyptian author Naguib Mahfouz's most celebrated works. He further developed his theme of existentialism using stream-of-consciousness and surrealist techniques. It charts the life of Said Mahran, a thief recently released from jail and intent on having his vengeance on the people who put him there. The novel was published in 1961, and Said's despair reflects disappointment in revolution and new order in Egypt—as Said is not only a thief, but a kind of disillusioned revolutionary.

== Plot summary ==
Said's world revolves around Nabawiyya, his former wife, and Sana', his daughter. Once in love with the former, she has now betrayed him by marrying his friend 'Ilish. Central to the making of Said Mahran is also Ra'uf 'Ilwan, his one-time criminal mentor, who used the same revolutionist rhetoric, but now, being a respected journalist and businessman, is in seeming opposition to Said, whose outlook hasn't changed. These perceived betrayals throw the protagonist into the utmost confusion and his initial calculation in revenge becomes ever more a wild flailing against the whole world. Only Nur, a prostitute, and Tarzan, a café-owner, provide Said with any aid and support from the world at large which is closing in on him, yet in time even they cannot help him.

== Characters in "The Thief and the Dogs" ==
- Said Mahran; the main character
- Rauf Ilwan; Mahran's erstwhile mentor
- Nabawiyya; Mahran's former wife, currently married to Illish
- Sana; Mahran's biological daughter
- Ilish Sidra; Mahran's friend until he betrays Said (currently married to Nabawiyya)
- Nur; a prostitute who loves Said
- Tarzan; a café-owner
- Sheikh: cleric, of shehab brotherhood Said's father had been a member and to whom Said turns for spiritual guidance

== Major themes ==
Heavily dependent on imagery, the thief, Said, is depicted as a tragic hero being Rady chased down by those he perceives as dogs. The recurring images of prison, betrayal and darkness amongst others also permeate the text. The novel is remarkable because it is the first novel to employ the stream of consciousness style of writing in Arabic. It helped, therefore, to confirm Mahfouz's stature as a pioneer in the field of literature.

== Adaptations ==
The novel was adapted into a film and a television series in Egypt. The film was first released in 1962, only one year after the novel was first published, with a screenplay by Salah Jahin. The film starred Shoukry Sarhan (Said), Kamal el-Shennawi, and Shadia (Nur). The television series was released in 1975, and lasted only one season (13 episodes). Although it was an Egyptian series, it was produced by a Dubai-based television station.
