= The Barred Road =

1958 film

- The Barred Road VHS cover
- Directed by: Salah Abouseif
- Written by: Ihsan Abdel Quddous; El Sayed Bedeir; Naguib Mahfouz
- Produced by: Abdelhalim Nasr; Ittihad Elfananeen
- Starring: Faten Hamama; Ahmed Mazhar
- Release date: 22 April 1958
- Country: Egypt
- Language: Arabic

The Barred Road (Arabic: الطريق المسدود, translit. Al-Tareeq al-Masdood) is a 1958 Egyptian drama/romance film.

Directed by the Egyptian film director Salah Abu Seif, this film is based on a novel with the same name written by the Egyptian novelist Ihsan Abdel Quddous. The film was co-written by El Sayed Bedeir and the Nobel Prize-winning writer Naguib Mahfouz. It starred Faten Hamama and Ahmed Mazhar. The film received an award from the Egyptian Catholic Center for Cinema and was selected one of the top 150 films in Egypt in 1996.

== Plot ==
Faten Hamama plays Fayza, a young student who lives with her family after the death of her father. Left with no money, her mother (Zouzou Mady) is forced to turn her house into an illegal gambling house. Fayza opposes her mother's solution. Munir (Ahmed Mazhar) is a writer who meets Fayza and falls in love with her but she rejects him. Fayza decides to leave to the countryside where she works as a teacher in a small school. Fayza gets into trouble in the school and, desperate and hopeless, decides to walk in her mother's path. Munir convinces Fayza to stop.

== Cast ==
- Faten Hamama as Fayza
- Ahmed Mazhar as Munir
- Shukry Sarhan as Ahmed
- Zouzou Mady as Fayza's mother
- Khayria Ahmed
- Ferdoos Mohammed
- Tewfik El Dekn
- Naima Wasfy
