= List of submissions to the 33rd Academy Awards for Best Foreign Language Film =

1960 Best Foreign Language Film submissions

Highlights
- Oscar winner: (Sweden) The Virgin Spring
- Submissions: 12
- Debuts: 1

This is a list of submissions to the 33rd Academy Awards for Best Foreign Language Film. The Academy Award for Best Foreign Language Film was created in 1956 by the Academy of Motion Picture Arts and Sciences to honour non-English-speaking films produced outside the United States. The award is handed out annually, and is accepted by the winning film's director, although it is considered an award for the submitting country as a whole. Countries are invited by the Academy to submit their best films for competition according to strict rules, with only one film being accepted from each country.

For the 33rd Academy Awards, twelve films were submitted in the category Academy Award for Best Foreign Language Film. Brazil submitted a film to the competition for the first time. The five nominated films came from France, Italy, Mexico, Sweden and Yugoslavia.

Sweden won for the first time with The Virgin Spring by Ingmar Bergman, which was also nominated for Best Costume Design, Black and White.

== Submissions ==
Submitting country	Film title used in nomination	Original title	Language(s)	Director(s)	Result
Brazil	Death Commands Brigandage	A Morte Comanda o Cangaço	Brazilian Portuguese	Carlos Coimbra & Walter Guimarães Motta	Not nominated
France	La Vérité		French	Henri-Georges Clouzot	Nominated
West Germany	Faust		German	Peter Gorski	Not nominated
Hong Kong	The Enchanting Shadow	倩女幽魂	Mandarin	Li Han-hsiang	Not nominated
India	The Great Moghul	मुग़ल-ए आज़म / مغلِ اعظم	Hindi, Urdu	K. Asif	Not nominated
Italy	Kapò		Italian	Gillo Pontecorvo	Nominated
Japan	Late Autumn	秋日和	Japanese	Yasujirō Ozu	Not nominated
Mexico	Macario		Spanish	Roberto Gavaldón	Nominated
Spain	At Five O'Clock in the Afternoon	A las cinco de la tarde	Spanish	Juan Antonio Bardem	Not nominated
Sweden	The Virgin Spring	Jungfrukällan	Swedish	Ingmar Bergman	Won Academy Award
United Arab Republic	Teenagers	المراهقات	Arabic	Ahmed Diaeddin	Not nominated
Yugoslavia	The Ninth Circle	Deveti krug	Serbo-Croatian	France Štiglic	Nominated

== Sources ==
- Margaret Herrick Library, Academy of Motion Picture Arts and Sciences
