= The Virgin Wife =

The Virgin Wife may refer to:

- The Virgin Wife (1958 film), an Egyptian crime/mystery film
- The Virgin Wife (1926 film), an American silent drama film
- La moglie vergine, internationally released as The Virgin Wife, a 1975 Italian film
- La esposa virgen (English: The Virgin Wife), a Mexican telenovela
