= El Leila El Kebira =

El Leila El Kebira (الليلة الكبيرة)
- Screenshot of the play
- Original language: Egyptian Arabic
- Written by: Salah Jahin; Sayed Mekawy (music)
- Subject: Moulid
- Genre: Comedy, Puppetry, Operetta
- Setting: Egypt

Premiere
- Date: 1 May 1961
- Original run: 40 mins

El Leila El Kebira (الليلة الكبيرة) (The Grand Night or The Big Night) is a 1961 Egyptian puppet-operetta that was written by poet Salah Jahin with the music composed by Sayed Mekawy. Approximately 40-minutes in length, it formed a big part of the Egyptian folklore due to its expressive and funny depiction of the moulid and has since been performed occasionally throughout the 1960s until today.

== Plot ==
The operetta describes the celebration of the last night of the moulid, a festival celebrating the Prophet Mohamed’s birthday, through the displaying of the activities done in an Egyptian village. Through a playful colorful and musically lively manner, it centers on displaying certain scenes from the carnival and the circus including food stall vendors, a fortune teller, hummus, circus performers (such as jugglers, clowns and lion tamers) and bellydancers, with catchy Egyptian folk songs and rhythms

Among the notable vocalists who have appeared in it are Sayed Mekawy and Salah Jahin.

== Credits ==
=== Crew ===
- Decoration: Mostafa Kamel
- Theatre direction: Salah El Sakka
- TV Direction: Mahmoud Bayoumi
- Art Direction: Naggy Shaker

=== Vocalists ===
- Shafiq Jalal
- Abdo Alsrouji
- Mohamed Roshdy
- Houria Hassan
- Ismail Shabana
- Salah Jahin
- Shafia Ahmed
- Hoda Sultan
- Mohamed Sourer-Askar
- Sayed Mekawy

== Productions ==
Originally in black and white, it was first colourised in the early 1980s. In 2001, it was performed by the Cairo Opera Ballet Company, which was directed by Abdel Moneim Kamel.

In November 2011 and July 2020, the play attracted large number of audiences at the Cairo Opera House.

As a new approach to the historic piece, in May 2014 the GUC Music Academy premiered its new production of El Leila El Kebira. The vision of Ohoude Khadr - back then manager of the GUC Music Academy - was to present a new contemporary approach, which younger generations can easily relate to. The re-arrangement included the musical, as well as the visual part. Composers Khaled El Kammar and Mina Samy rearranged the entire piece for classical orchestra, including an oriental section, electronic instruments, choir and soloists. The technology of projection mapping applied by media designers Ghada Fikri and Yacoub Yassin played a major role in the visual part. The choir wearing white Egyptian traditional gowns (galabeya) was used as a projection space. Special characters were designed for the soloists by Amr Kandil to include the original characters for this version of the show. The premiere was conducted by maestro Shady Abdel Salam. Later the same year in December 2014, the piece was performed again featuring famous Egyptian marimba artist Nesma Abdel Aziz. A special part was composed for her by Kammar.

In November 2014, musical theatre group Fabrica made a live-action rendition of the play which involved real people as instead of puppets.

The play was performed at the 34th Neapolis International Festival Kid's Theatre in Tunisia in December 2019.

A ballet version, directed by Abdel Moneim Kamel, was broadcast on Egyptian Ministry of Culture’s Youtube channel in March 2020, which was part of the “Stay at home.. Culture in your hands” motivation, initiated by Culture Minister Enas Abdel-Dayem as part of the effort to stop the spread of coronavirus (COVID-19).

== Legacy ==
The play became an instant success in 1960 after it was first shown. Following its success in Egypt, it began to tour the world with international honours beginning with Bucharest’s International Puppet Festival (1960), where it won awards for puppet and scenography designs. These achievements continued over the years as the play continued to collect awards and recognition in Syria (1967), the US (1980), Jordan (1993), France (1995), Italy (1997) and Tunisia (2000). The play remains one of the most important theatrical acts of the 1960s in Egypt, and arguably across the Arab world, due to its cultural relevance, nostalgia and golden age of Egypt's music.

== Animated film ==
An animated film based on the play will be released in 2022. Max Howard, the former president of Warner Brothers and studio executive of Disney's The Lion King, and Maggie Malone, a creative executive at Disney, were consulted by the producers Ahmed Hammouda and Abdulrahman Khedr during the production of the animated feature. The trailer was released in September 2020.

== Bibliography ==
- "Salah Jaheen". Egypt State Information Service. Archived from the original on 2008-11-20.
- Salah Jahin form arabworldbooks
