= Sanaa Mazhar =

Egyptian actress (1932-2018)

- سناء مظهر
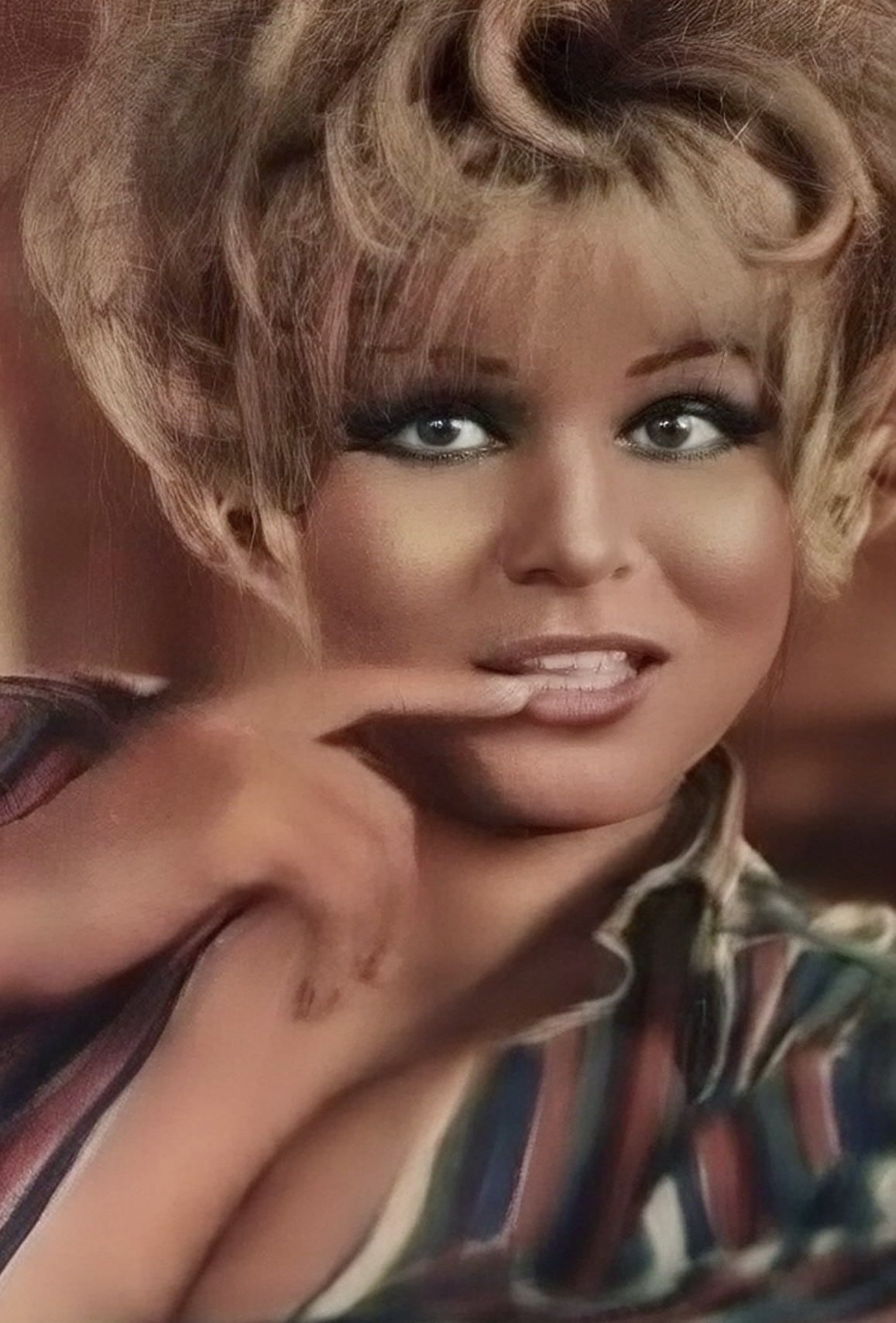
- Sanaa Mazhar in 1972
- Born: August 17, 1932; Egypt
- Died: August 6, 2018 (aged 85)
- Occupation: Actress
- Years active: 1932-2018
- Known for: Aghla Min Hayati

Sanaa Mazhar (Arabic: سناء مظهر; August 17, 1932 – August 6, 2018) was an Egyptian actress, one of the three girls in the film "Bayya'et el Garayed" with Magda al-Sabahi and Naima Akef.

== Life and career ==
Mazhar was born on 17 August 1932. She married a man who died in the Yom Kippur War in 1973, and she never married again.

She was one of the three girls in Bayaat Al Jarid with Magda and Naima Akef. She acted in Aghla Min Hayati (1965).

Mazhar acted with notable actresses like Hind Rostom, Nadia Lutfi, Nagat El-Sagheera, Shadia, and with notable actors like Salah Zulfikar and Rushdy Abaza. She participated in many historical works, playing roles as "Queen of Saba". She was very sensitive to some of the stars who asked her to change the color of her hair. She also used to design all the details of her artistic personality from her hairstyle, her hair ties and accessories.

Mazhar preferred to live quietly, away from the glamor of stardom and fame, like an ordinary Egyptian woman. She wore the hijab and retired completely in 1985. She was never ashamed of any of her prior works. It is reported that Yusuf Sibai had offered her roles in his film productions but she refused because it had scenes of lust.

== Death ==
She died on the morning of 6 August 2018 at the age of 86 years.
