= Qays ibn al-Mulawwah =

7th-century Umayyad poet

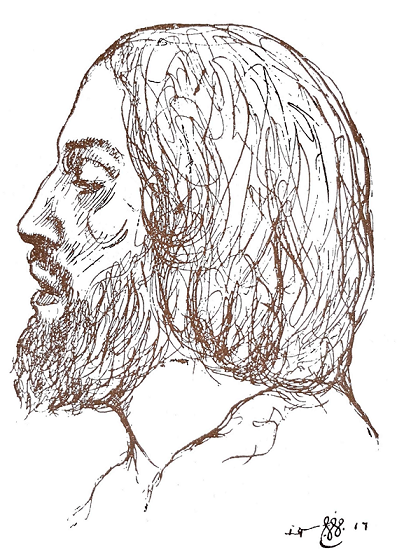
- A sketch of Qays ibn al-Mulawwah by the Lebanese-American poet and artist Kahlil Gibran.
- Born: Qays bin Al-Mulawwah bin Muzahim; Najd, Arabia
- Occupation: Poet
- Writing career
- Language: Classical Arabic
- Period: Umayyad Caliphate

Qays ibn al-Moullawwah (Arabic: قَيْسُ بْنُ الْمُلَوَّحِ بْنُ مُزَاحِمٍ الْعَامِرِيّ, romanized: Qays ibn al-Mulawwaḥ ibn Muzāḥim al-ʿĀmirī) was a 7th-century Arabian poet from Najd, Arabia, a member of the Bedouin tribe Banu 'Amir. He lived during the Umayyad Caliphate. Qays was renowned for his profound love for Layla, a woman who belong to the same tribe, which gave him a posthumous epithet of Majnūn (madman).

According to early historical accounts by narrators such as Ibn Qutaybah and al-Isfahani, Qays and Layla were cousins belonging to the Banu Amir tribe. These sources report that the pair first encountered each other as children while tending their flocks in the desert, and their early bond eventually gave rise to the enduring legend of Majnun and Layla.

== Lineage ==
The 10th century Abbasid historian Abu al-Faraj al-Isfahani, author of Kitab al-Aghani list Qays ancestry as follows: Qays ibn al-Mulawwah ibn Muzahim ibn ʿUdas ibn Rabiʿah ibn Jaʿdah ibn Kaʿb ibn Rabiʿah ibn ʿAmir ibn Saʿsaʿah from Banu Amir.

== Qasida (poem to Layla) ==
I sing of Layla,
of the honey that lounges coquettishly on the forearm,
of the lazy pomegranate,
of the Futuwwa whispering its desert near simile,
of the Bedouin eyes, the fire, the cheek.

She is for me
an adventure stirring the desire of poets should they sing:
“East wind of Najd, when did you start to blow so briskly?”

Of flimsy slumber that betrays us,
of our rapturous love,
of her,
so the desert might know only aloe and laurel.

I sing of Layla,
of the slain
of our blood squandered,
of the beast-friend
and the lure of lovers,
of wakefulness seeking night
and two children timid to meet.
When the apple trees blossom
they tremble in correspondence
until timidity feels embarrassed.

Layla possesses a sweeter moan
when passion takes us astray
and flames race the length of our limbs.
Whether living or dead,
when told we’ve committed a sin,
a sigh will cry within us
should they forgive.

== Translation ==
The Diwan (collection) of the original Arabic qasidas of Qays ibn al-Mulawwah have been translated to other languages:

- English translation and commentary, in Jaroslav Stetkevych, 'The Zephyrs of Najd'.
- Japanese translation, 'Laila and Majnun: An Arab Love Story' (translated by Emiko Okada, Heibonsha Toyo Bunko, 1981)

== Media portrayals ==
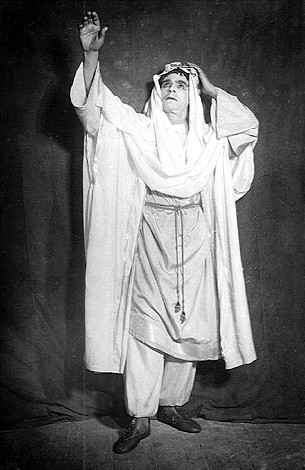
Sarabski as Qays from the opera Leyla and Majnun (1908) by Uzeyir Hajibeyov.

- Egyptian actor Shoukry Sarhan as Qays, in the 1960 Arabic film Qays wa Laila.
- Lebanese actor Yorgo Chalhoub as Qays, in the 2008 Arabic tv series Majnun Layla.
- H. Sarabski as Qays, from the opera Leyla and Majnun (1908) by Uzeyir Hajibeyov.

== See also ==
- Antarah ibn Shaddad a pre-Islamic Arabian poet whose devotion to his beloved Abla was immortalized in his epic poem.
