= A Night of Love =

1951 film

- Directed by: Ahmed Badrakhan
- Written by: Saleh Gawdat; Mohamed Abdelhalim Abdallah
- Starring: Mahmoud El-Meliguy
- Cinematography: Abdelhalim Nasr
- Edited by: Kamal El Sheikh; Salah Ezz El-Din
- Music by: Ahmed Sedky; Izzat al-Jahili
- Distributed by: Behna Films; Nasibian Studio
- Release date: 1951
- Running time: 120 minutes
- Country: Egypt
- Language: Arabic

A Night of Love (Arabic: ليلة غرام) is a 1951 Egyptian film directed by Ahmed Badrakhan and starring Mahmoud El-Meliguy. It was entered into the 1952 Cannes Film Festival. The film was written by Saleh Gawdat and Mohamed Abdelhalim Abdallah, and also stars Zeinab Sedky, Zouzou Nabil, Zouzou Hamdi El Hakim, Sanaa Samih, Sayed Abu Bakr, and Mohamed Abdel Muttalib.

Laila is a foundling girl raised in an orphanage. She works as a nurse, but her colleagues plot to expel her from the hospital. She meets a wealthy young man who sees a future with her, but his father refuses after discovering her secret, so she tries to find her real parents.

== Plot ==
In the Kafr al-Ashraf neighborhood of Qalyub, a mother (Zouzou Nabil) leaves her infant daughter in front of a mosque, where Sheikh Imran (Zaki Ibrahim) found her and handed her over to the house of worship. From there, she was transferred to an orphanage run by Asim Effendi (Fattouh Nashati) and the director (Negma Ibrahim), who name her Laila Abdullah and entrust her to the wet nurse, Zainab (Aziza Helmy). Dr. Kamal Al-Safty (Mahmoud el-Meliguy), who lives nearby and supervises the nurses at the orphanage, wishes to adopt Laila but demurs to avoid bothering his barren wife (Zouzou Hamdi El Hakim). Zainab continues to care for Laila but catches diphtheria from a recovering orphan named Jamila (Suhair Fakhri); before Zainab dies of it, she asks Laila to call Zainab’s daughter Kawkab, who lives in the affluent Al-Munirah neighborhood of Cairo. Laila (Mariam Fakhr Eddine) grows up to become a nurse and is recruited by Kamal to work in his hospital, earning the jealousy of her colleagues. Laila rents a room in Al-Munirah from Umm Soraya (Ferdoos Mohammed) alongside milk seller Kawkab (Magda al-Sabahi), who knows and keeps the secret of being Laila’s milk sibling. The nurse Samira (Sanaa Samih) is the ringleader of those who discover Laila’s secret and expel her by telling Kamal she was secretly claiming to be his own child. A jurist named Sayid Amir (Hussein Riad), who she operates on, helps her find work outside Cairo, specifically at Al Mouwasat University Hospital in Alexandria, while Kawkab gets married and joins her husband in Faiyum. Laila finds friendship and soon something more with Dr. Rushdi Abdellatif (Gamal Fares), bringing out jealousy once again from nurse Souad (Samiha Tawfik. On Amir’s advice, she comes clean about her origins to Rushdi, who accepts her and takes her to meet his father Abdellatif (Abbas Faris) and mother (Zainab Sidqi) in Faiyum. Rushdi tells his parents that Laila is the daughter of a wealthy man, but Kawkab innocently reveals otherwise, causing Abdellatif to reject Laila. Laila accepts this, not wanting to come between father and son, but Amir steps in and proclaims that if he can accept her as his daughter, Abdellatif can accept her as daughter-in-law, paving the way for the happy ending.

== Cast ==
- Zainab Sidqi (Rashdi's mother)
- Zouzou Nabil (Laila's mother)
- Zouzou Hamdi El Hakim (Kamal's wife)
- Sanaa Samih (Samira)
- Sayed Abu Bakr
- Mohamed Abdel Muttalib
- Taheyya Kariokka (herself)
- Magda al-Sabahi (Kawkab)
- Karem Mahmoud (Mahmoud)
- Aziza Helmy (Zainab the wet nurse)
- Mahmoud el-Meliguy (Dr. Kamal Al-Safty)
- Negma Ibrahim (orphanage director)
- Afaf Shaker (Laila’s friend in the orphanage)
- Fatheia Shahin (head nurse)
- Mariam Fakhr Eddine (Laila)
- Hussein Riad (Sayid Amir)
- Ferdoos Mohammed (Umm Soraya)
- Abbas Fares (Abdellatif Bey)
- Widad Hamdi (Ahlam)
- Soraya Fakhry (Sayid Amir’s wife)
- Abdulrahim Al-Zarqani (teacher)
