= The Guns and the Fury =

- Directed by: Tony Zarrindast
- Written by: Donald Fredette; Tony Zarrindast
- Starring: Peter Graves; Cameron Mitchell; Michael Ansara; Albert Salmi
- Music by: Jack Wheaton
- Release date: 1981
- Running time: 90 minutes
- Country: United States
- Language: English

The Guns and the Fury is a 1981 film starring Peter Graves and Cameron Mitchell.

== Overview ==
After the turn of the century, two fortune hunters discover oil in Persia, when they try to claim it serious resistance stands in their way.

== Cast ==
- Peter Graves - Mark Janzer
- Cameron Mitchell - Jack Piper
- Michael Ansara - Prince Sohrab
- Albert Salmi - Colonel Liakhov
- Barry Stokes - Paul Halders
- Shaun Curry - Major Wayne-Smith
- Derren Nesbitt - Captain Noel
- Ahmed Mazhar - Sheik Khazal Khan
- Monique Vermeer - Suzanne Fournier
- Benjamin Feitelson - Karim Kahn
