= Cairo (1963 film) =

1963 film by Wolf Rilla

- U.S. film poster
- Directed by: Wolf Rilla
- Screenplay by: Joan LaCour Scott
- Based on: The Asphalt Jungle (1949 novel) by W. R. Burnett; The Asphalt Jungle (1950 film) by; Ben Maddow; John Huston
- Produced by: Ronald Kinnoch
- Starring: George Sanders; Richard Johnson; Faten Hamama; John Meillon; Ahmed Mazhar; Eric Pohlmann
- Cinematography: Desmond Dickinson
- Edited by: Bernard Gribble
- Music by: Kenneth V. Jones
- Production companies: Lawrence P. Bachmann Productions; MGM-British Studios
- Distributed by: Metro-Goldwyn-Mayer
- Release dates: January 1963 (U.K.); February 6, 1963 (U.S.)
- Running time: 91 minutes
- Countries: United Kingdom; United States
- Language: English

Cairo is a 1963 heist film directed by Wolf Rilla, written by Joan LaCour Scott, and starring George Sanders, Richard Johnson, Faten Hamama (in her only English-language role), John Meillon, Ahmed Mazhar and Eric Pohlmann. It is a remake of the 1950 film noir The Asphalt Jungle, relocated from the American Midwest to the titular Egyptian city. The film was released in January 1963 by Metro-Goldwyn-Mayer.

== Plot ==
Former British soldier Major Pickering flies into Cairo on a phony passport. He has had years in a German prison to develop a foolproof plan to rob King Tut's jewels from the Egyptian Museum. He contacts Nicodemos, a shady casino operator and brother of his con artist ex-cellmate, and lays out his bombshell. He declares the daring heist will net a jaw-dropping quarter million dollars.

Pickering then begins to round up a gang to execute his plan. For a safe-cracker he starts with reliable countryman and ex-soldier Willy. An explosive expert and once top "box man", he's now married to an Egyptian and father of a toddler. Reluctant to join in, he is persuaded by a too big to say no to promise of $25,000.

Which is all it is, as the Major is penniless and needs financial backers. He turns to Nicodemos, who suggests the suave and wealthy Kuchuk, an importer-exporter capable of both funding the job and disposing of its jewels. Kuchuk is agreeable, but the gang's front money ends up coming out of Nikodimos' till instead.

Needing a gunman, the Major next hires hot-headed hashish addict Ali, and as getaway driver the owner of Ali's coffee shop hang-out Kerim. Kerim is street-smart and sound, but Ali is in an accelerated downward spiral...hounded by the local police, living in squalor, and cold and indifferent to belly dancing girlfriend Amina when she shows up pregnant by him at his rooms. In his torment, he fixates upon the robbery payday as his last chance to buy back the sugarcane farm he was born on outside the city and shake Cairo's urban demons.

Following the Major's meticulous timetable, the safecracking team sneaks into the museum as planned, but accidentally triggers alarms outside it with their explosives. A suspicious guard investigates and is shot, with his gun going off and accidentally hitting Willy. Badly wounded in the gut, he asks to be dropped off at home.

When the Major and Ali arrive that evening at their rendezvous with Kuchuk, he and his trigger-happy accomplice Ghattas attempt to pull an audacious double-cross. In an ensuing shoot-out Ghattas is killed and Ali wounded through his side. Outraged equally at the gambit and its bloodshed, the Major demands Kuchuk propose a deal to the police: $200,000 cash, or the invaluable treasures will be melted into ingots for easy disposal.

Headlines blare, and the noose begins to tighten. A cowardly Nicodemos is rounded up and intimidated into confessing all by a persistent police commandant, Karim is jailed, and Willy dies at home.

Ghattas' body is dredged from the river, raising police suspicions toward Kuchuk before he can act. He is put under surveillance. Cornered, he commits suicide.

Ali flees the city by jeep with Amina, and the Major is disguised as a native and set to be floated away on a Nile boat. Arriving at his old village, Ali's beloved farm is neglected and parched. Delirious, he dies in loyal Amina's arms desperately trying to bring water to it.

The Major, who has a bit too much of an eye for a belly dancer, becomes entranced by one and his boat ghosts off without him. Surrounded by police and resigned to another long prison term, he is arrested without a fight.

== Cast ==
- George Sanders as Major Pickering
- Richard Johnson as Ali
- Faten Hamama as Amina
- John Meillon as Willy
- Ahmed Mazhar as Kerim
- Eric Pohlmann as Nicodemos
- Walter Rilla as Kuchuk
- Kamal el-Shennawi as Ghattas
- Salah Nazmi as Police Commandant
- Shwikar as Marie
- Mona Saxena as Bamba
- Abdel Khalek Saleh as Assistant Minister
- Said Abu Bakr as Osman
- Salah Mansour as Doctor
- Yousuf Shaaban and Ezzat El Alaili as Officers

== Production ==
The film reunited the star, producer and director of Village of the Damned (1960) and was made through MGM's British production arm under Lawrence Bachmann. It was shot entirely in and around Cairo, including at the Egyptian Museum, the City of the Dead, the Giza Plateau, the Colossi of Memnon, the Medinet Habu and Cairo International Airport. Studio interiors were shot at Arabian Studios. Filming took place in mid 1962.

Richard Johnson was under contract to MGM.

Prominent Egyptian composer Andre Ryder was originally attached to write the film's score, but was replaced by Kenneth V. Jones before release.

== Release ==
The film premiered in San Francisco on January 23, 1963, and went into wide release in February.
