= Aghla Min Hayati =

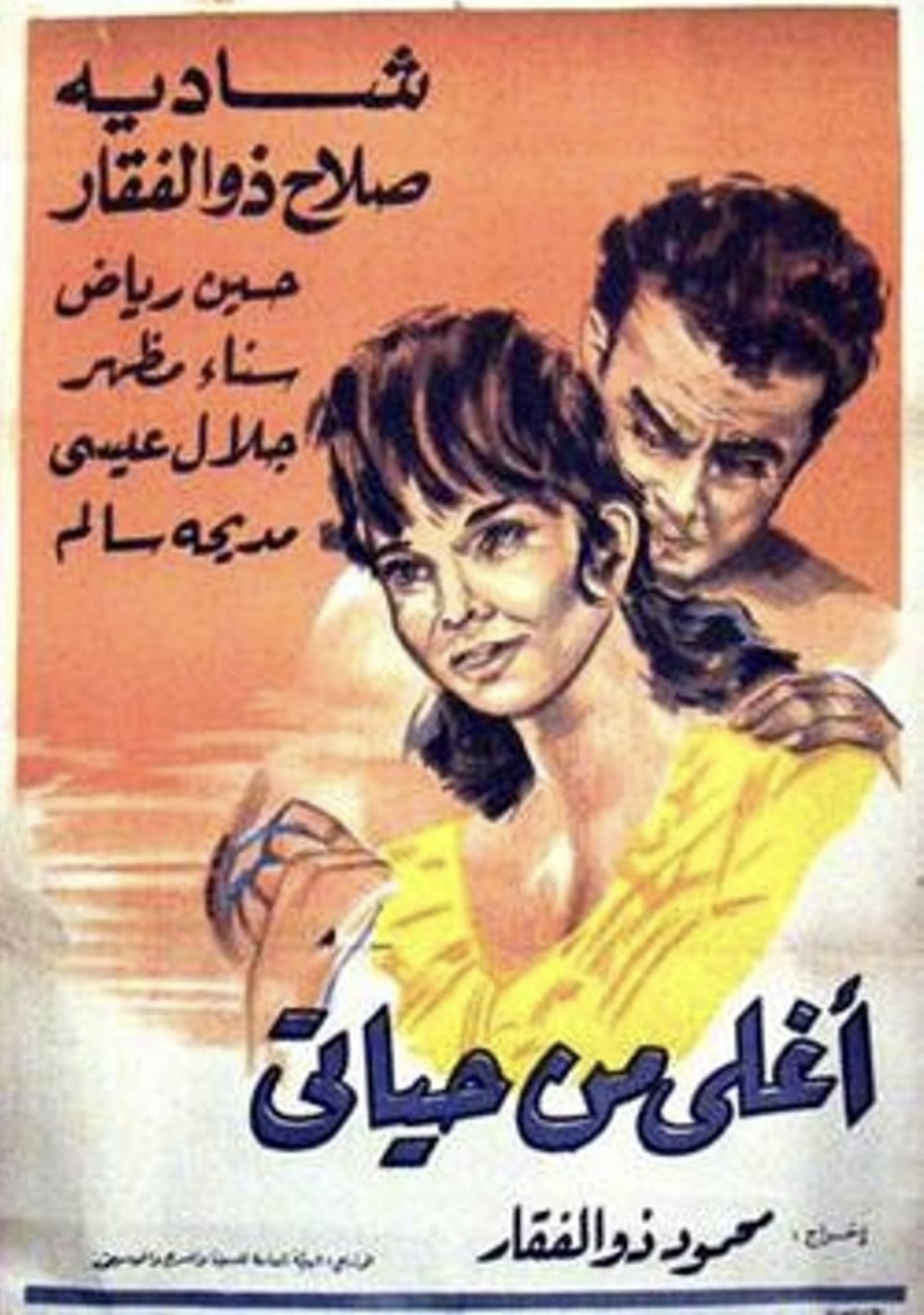
- Theatrical release poster
- Arabic: أغلي من حياتي
- Directed by: Mahmoud Zulfikar
- Written by: Fathi Zaki; Mohammed Abu Youssef
- Starring: Salah Zulfikar; Shadia; Hussein Riad
- Cinematography: Mahmoud Nasr
- Edited by: Said El Sheikh
- Music by: Andre Ryder
- Production company: Cairo Cinema Corporation
- Distributed by: Cairo Cinema Corporation
- Release date: 14 April 1965 (Egypt)
- Country: Egypt
- Language: Egyptian Arabic

Aghla Min Hayati (English: Dearer than my Life, Arabic: أغلي من حياتي) is a 1965 Egyptian romantic drama film based on Fannie Hurst's novel Back street and directed by Mahmoud Zulfikar. It stars Salah Zulfikar and Shadia.

== Plot ==
Ahmed and Mona live a strong love story since childhood in Marsa Matrouh, and the only witness to their love was Naguib's uncle.. Ahmed proposes to Mona, but her father refuses his request on the pretext that Ahmed is still a student and that he has a long time to study abroad and that Mona is engaged to another person, Ahmed despairs Mona's father agreed to marry and travel abroad to complete his studies. As for Mona, she did not marry the other person. When he learned about her love story for Ahmed, and during Ahmed's travels, Mona learned that he married his son, the manager of the company in which he works, then Mona's father died, so she left Marsa Matrouh and worked in Cairo as a teacher. Ahmed has returned from abroad after seven years have passed, and he has two children, Adel and Mona. One day, Mona meets Ahmed by chance and learns that she has not married and that she still loves him. Then they marry and their marriage remains a secret that no one knows about except Naguib's uncle. After several years, Adel, Ahmed's son discovered his father's relationship with Mona and they confronted her and asked her to leave his father, so his father got angry so much that Ahmed had to announce in front of his son that Mona was his wife, and the matter ended with Ahmed's illness and a heart attack as a result of what happened, then his death after he instructed his son to take care of Mona.

== Primary cast ==
- Salah Zulfikar as Ahmed
- Shadia as Mona
- Hussein Riad as Naguib
- Madiha Salem as Mona, Ahmed's daughter
- Sanaa Mazhar as Seham, Ahmed's wife
- Galal Issa as Adel, Ahmed's son

== Reception ==
The love story between Ahmed and Mona became one of Egyptian cinema classic love stories. And the two main characters Salah Zulfikar and Shadia actually married while filming.
