= Injustice Is Forbidden =

- الظلم حرام
- Directed by: Hasan El-Saifi
- Starring: Shadia; Farid Shawqi; Magda al-Sabahi; Emad Hamdy; Katie; Dalida
- Music by: Munir Mourad
- Color process: Black and white
- Release date: July 25, 1954 (Egypt)
- Running time: 110 min
- Country: Egypt
- Language: Arabic

Injustice Is Forbidden (Arabic: الظلم حرام, romanized: Aẓ-ẓulm ḥarām, colloquially rendered as El Zolm Haram) is a 1954 Egyptian drama, directed by Hasan El-Saifi. The film starred Shadia, Farid Shawqi, Magda al-Sabahi, Emad Hamdy, Katie (or Kitty) and Dalida.

== Plot ==
Samira and Hoda are loyal female friends. Samira falls in love with Farid, who deceives her; and then Samira gets pregnant with his child. Samira marries a young wealthy man. Farid tries to extort her for money, under the pretext that she had participated in a murder.

== See also ==
- List of Egyptian films of 1954
