= Sayed Mekawy =

Egyptian singer and composer (1927–1997)

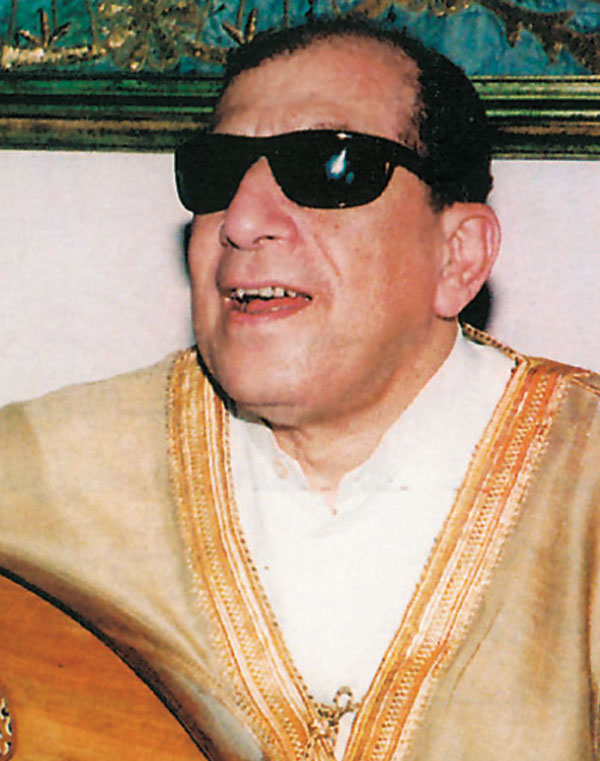
- Sayed Mekawy

Background information
- Born: Sayed Mekawy; May 8, 1927; Sayeda Zeinab, Cairo; Kingdom of Egypt
- Died: April 21, 1997, aged 69 Cairo, Egypt
- Occupations: Singer and Composer
- Instrument: Oud

Sayed Mekawy (Arabic: سيد مكاوي; May 8, 1927 – April 21, 1997) was an Egyptian singer and composer, popular in Egypt and throughout the Arabic speaking world. Throughout his life, he remained undaunted by modern innovations and the attempts of rivals to produce another type of music. He was best known for his radio collaboration with Fuad Haddad on the character of the Egyptian tradition of El-Misaharati.

== Life ==
Mekawy was born in Cairo Sayeda Zeinab district of Al-Nasriya on May 8, 1927.

When his father died, Mekawy cried for days. Later, the pain eased, but the tears kept flowing. Doctors were powerless either to diagnose his condition or to stop the tears. One day, however, he could no longer see. This condition did not prevent him from learning the Qur'an or becoming an Azharite scholar.

Having been trained in the art of reciting the Qur'an, Mekawy's voice could thrill his audience. He sang solo at numerous concerts, though this is not what brought him fame, or confirmed his status as one of the most popular composers of oriental music.

What brought him fame, however, was the unforgettable character of al-Missaharati, the man who announces the pre-dawn meal during the month of Ramadan, that he and Fuad Haddad created in 1951. A popular figure during the holy month, the Missaharati was given new life by Haddad's words and Mekawy's music. Composed to the beat of the traditional "Tabla" (Drum), it stirs up feelings of patriotism, nationalism and pride in Arab Muslim culture. The Missaharati represented an entire generation, expressing its suffering, frustrations and dreams. When Al-Missaharati was aired for the first time on the radio, it instantly became a symbol of national aspirations. It continues forty years later to help the faithful keep vigil, exhorting Muslims to rise for their pre-dawn meal.

Touching his audience to the quick, Mekawy in fact, touched on all the important economic, social, intellectual and political issues directly concerning the less privileged classes. Critical of any national shortcoming, he was prompt to deride bureaucracy in his song Al-lstemara Rakba Al-Humara ("The Questionnaire on a Donkey"). But Ha'n hareb ("We Shall Fight"), which came out in 1956, and Al-Ard Bitetkalem Arabi ("The land Speaks Arabic"), composed after 1973, were also true expressions of pride in his country.

More than anything, however, Mekawi will be remembered for his contribution to Egyptian folklor music and especially the operetta El Leila El Kebira ("The Big Night"), for which he wrote the music to the words of poet Salah Jahin. First conceived for the radio, describing the last and most important night of the "Moulid", a saint's festival, it was later adapted for the puppet theatre and aired on television, becoming an instant and lasting success with children and grown-ups alike.

Mekawy died on the 11th anniversary of Salah Jahin's death. Of Salah Jahin, he used to say, "We get along like "Assal" with "Tehina", (molasses and sesame paste which always go together).

== Selected works ==
- 100 musical compositions for religious songs, the most famous being one set for the ʾAsmāʾul-Ḥusnā.
- 30 compositions celebrating the Prophet's birthday or Moulid El-Nabi.
- Al-Missaharati.
- Umm Kulthum's Ya Messaharni.
- The operetta El Leila El Kebira.
- Music for several TV series.
- He wrote music for almost all popular singers, except Abdel Halim Hafez.
- He also acted in one film directed by Ali Badrakhan, "El-Arous El-Saghira" (The Little Bride).
- Composed the music to "Harun Al-Rashid", a TV series with Mahmoud Al-Saadani and Salah Jahin.
- Among his most popular songs are "Nashid Al-Muqawma Al-Sha'biya" (The Popular Resistance Anthem), "Gana El-Fagr" (Dawn is upon us), and "Ommal Hafr El-Qanal" (The workers who dug the Canal).

== See also ==
- List of Egyptians
