= Return My Heart =

1957 Egyptian film

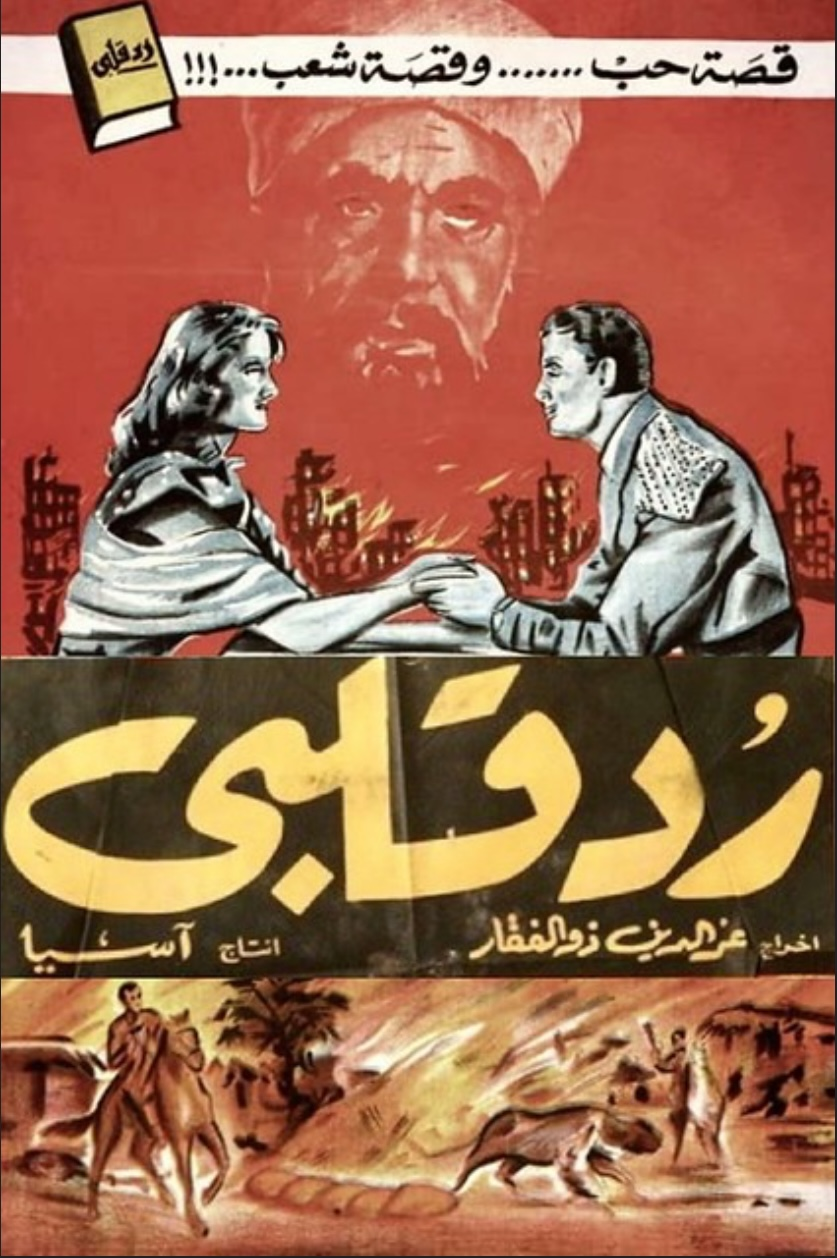
- Film poster
- Arabic: رد قلبى
- Directed by: Ezz El-Dine Zulficar
- Written by: Yusuf Sibai
- Screenplay by: Ezz El-Dine Zulficar
- Produced by: Asia Dagher
- Starring: Shoukry Sarhan; Mariam Fakhr Eddine; Salah Zulfikar; Hussein Riad; Hind Rostom
- Cinematography: Wahid Farid
- Edited by: Kamal Abu El Ela
- Music by: Fouad El Zahery
- Production company: Lotus Film
- Distributed by: Lotus Film
- Release date: December 10, 1957 (Egypt)
- Country: Egypt
- Language: Egyptian Arabic

Return My Heart (Arabic: رد قلبى, translit: Rodd Qalbi) is a 1957 Egyptian film directed by Ezz El-Dine Zulficar and written by Yusuf Sibai and Ezz El-Dine Zulficar. It stars Shoukry Sarhan, Mariam Fakhr Eddine, Salah Zulfikar, Hussein Riad and Hind Rostom. The film is listed in the Top 100 Egyptian films of the 20th century.

== Synopsis ==
The film chronicles the story of a poor young man, the son of a gardener, named Ali (Shoukry Sarhan) and his brother Hussein (Salah Zulfikar), and Ali and his immortal love for a rich princess named Engy (Mariam Fakhr eddine) does not see the light of class discrimination, and her father's categorical rejection of that marriage. Their relationship becomes complicated when her father learns of this relationship, so he expels Ali's father, and Engy threatens that he will smite her lover if she does not back down. In fact, Engy backs down from the relationship and becomes engaged to someone else. Ali's life is turned upside down, and he and Engy's life becomes complicated; As he felt that Engy had betrayed him.

== Crew ==
- Director: Ezz El-Dine Zulficar
- Story writer: Yusuf Sibai
- Screenplay: Ezz El-Dine Zulficar
- Producer: Asia Dagher
- Cinematographer: Wahid Farid
- Editor: Kamal Abu El Ela
- Music: Fouad El Zahery
- Studio: Lotus Film
- Distributor: Lotus Film

== Cast ==
- Shoukry Sarhan as officer Ali Abdul Wahed
- Mariam Fakhr eddine as Princess Engy
- Salah Zulfikar as officer Hussein Abdul Wahed
- Hussain Riad as Al-Rais Abdul Wahed Al-ganaini, father of Ali and Hussein
- Hind Rostom as the dancer Karima
- Ferdoos Mohammed as mother of Ali and Hussein
- Ahmed Allam as Prince Ismail Kamal
- Zahret El-Ola as Bahiya, the daughter of Ali's aunt and Hussain's wife
- Ahmed Mazhar as Prince Alaa, brother of Engy
- Kamal Yassin as Suleiman is Ali's best friend
- Rushdy Abaza as Refaat the friend of Ali and Hussein
- Adly Kasseb
- Iskandar Mansi as a colleague farmer and friend of Al-Rais Abdel Wahed

== In culture ==
Since its release in 1957, the film has been shown on the Egyptian state television on every 23 July, which is the anniversary of the 1952 revolution, due to the fact that the main character, Ali, joined the Free Officers Movement which carried out the revolution.

== See also ==
- Egyptian cinema
- Salah Zulfikar filmography
- List of Egyptian films of the 1950s
