= The Naked Truth (1963 film) =

- الحقيقة العارية
- Directed by: Atef Salem
- Written by: Mohamed Osman
- Produced by: Magda al-Sabahi
- Starring: Magda; Ihab Nafea
- Release date: December 16, 1963
- Running time: 115 minutes
- Country: Egypt
- Language: Egyptian Arabic

The Naked Truth (Arabic: الحقيقة العارية, transliterated as El-Haqiqa El-Aria) is an Egyptian film released on December 16, 1963. The film is directed by Atef Salem, features a screenplay by Mohamed Osman, and stars Magda, Ihab Nafea, Seham Fathi, Faten El Shoubashi, and Abdel Moneim Ibrahim. In 1975, the film was also released in the Soviet Union.

== Cast ==
- Magda el-Sabahi (Amal Abdelhamid)
- Ihab Nafea (Ahmed Refaat)
- Seham Fathi (Karima)
- Faten El Shoubashi (Hoda)
- Abdel Moneim Ibrahim (Ramses)

== Synopsis ==
Amal Abdelhamid is a woman who wants to be independent and shape her destiny without men, so she stays unmarried and works successfully as a tourist guide. One day, while she guides a tour group on a trip to Aswan, everything changes when she falls for the engineer Ahmed Refaat (Ihab Nafea). He is working on building the Aswan Dam and changes her ideas about men completely.
