= The Virgin Wife (1958 film) =

1958 film

- Faten Hamama, Ahmed Mazhar and Imad Hamdi in Al-Zawjah al-Azra'
- Directed by: El Sayed Bedeir
- Written by: Mustafa Samy
- Produced by: Ramses Naguib
- Starring: Faten Hamama; Ahmed Mazhar; Imad Hamdi
- Cinematography: Mahmoud Nasr
- Release date: September 14, 1958
- Country: Egypt
- Language: Arabic

The Virgin Wife (Arabic: الزوجة العذراء, translit. Al-Zawjah al-Azra) is a 1958 Egyptian crime/mystery film. Directed by El Sayed Bedeir, the film was written by Mustafa Samy and starred Faten Hamama, Imad Hamdi and Ahmed Mazhar.

== Plot ==
Magdi (Ahmed Mazhar) and Dr. Fouad (Imad Hamdi) meet Souad (Zouzou Mady) and her daughter Mona (Faten Hamama). Souad, who suffers from poverty, decides to introduce her daughter to Magdi, a rich man, hoping that he can fall in love with her beautiful daughter and ask to marry her in order to save her from poverty. Magid does fall in love with Mona and she falls for him too. The lovers decide to marry each other. Before the marriage, Magdi reveals a personal secret to her mother. Magdi tells her that an accident he experienced left him with sexual dysfunction. Mona's mother, however, accepts this and conceals it from Mona.

By time, Mona and Magdi's marriage fails and their relationship weakens. Magdi suspects Mona of having an affair with Dr. Fouad, his friend. He records a phone conversation between the two which leaves him doubtless. Furious, Magdi changes his will and decides to forbid Mona from any inheritance, choosing to donate his money and properties to charity. A devastated Magdi unconsciously has an overdose of medicine and dies. Dr. Fouad is suspected of the murder and arrested. Ironically, it is revealed that it was Souad who killed Magdi, after learning that he is not going to leave her daughter his fortunes. Souad feels guilty for the murder and surrenders herself to the police.

== Cast ==
- Faten Hamama as Mona
- Ahmed Mazhar as Magdi
- Imad Hamdi as Dr. Fouad
- Zouzou Mady as Souad, the mother
- Fakher Fakher
- Adly Kasseb

Amr Kasseb 00:31, 30 September 2009 (UTC)
