= Tony Kaldas =

Tony Kaldas طونى قلدس
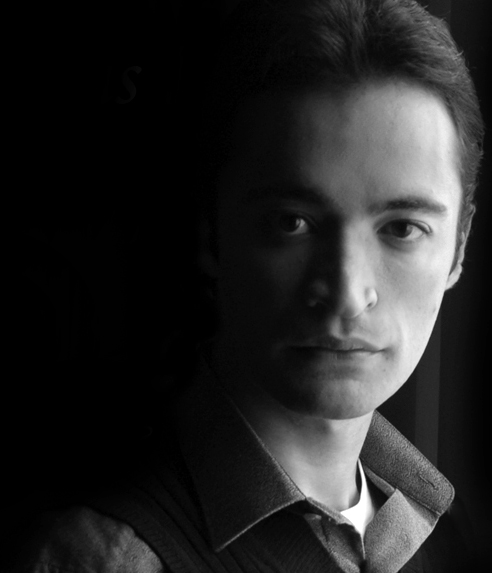

Background information
- Born: Antoine Kaldas; January 20, 1984 (age 42)
- Genres: Pop music Jazz Oriental Classic Chanson
- Occupations: Singer, songwriter, actor, composer, art director
- Instrument: Vocal ukulele
- Years active: 2007–present
- Website: www.tonykaldas.com

Antoine Kaldas (Arabic: طوني قلدس; born January 20, 1984), also known as Tony Kaldas, is an Egyptian-Greek singer, composer, performer, and healer who spent his first 25 years in Egypt.

He blends several genres, notably jazz, classical, pop, and world music, and languages through his songs and concerts in an attempt create a variety of unique pieces.

Kaldas studied classical singing for 6 years at the Cairo Opera House while also studying architecture. Kaldas studied architecture and worked for years as an underground singer, as well as an art director, graphic designer, retoucher and digital marketer. He also worked as a voice actor for Arabic versions of Disney movies and commercial advertisements. Additionally, Kaldas has studied different types of healing practices, such as quantum touch, chakr healing, and hypnotherapy, combining these methods with his knowledge of music and voice.

His performance in Brussels, in 2012, representing the Middle East in an Arabic song, was written by the late Gibran Khalil Gibran, and composed and performed by Kaldas himself.

== Early life ==
Kaldas was born on January 20, 1984 in Cairo, Egypt, the son of an Egyptian father and a Greek mother. He displayed musical talent at a young age, performing musicals at the age of 4. His parents were resistant as they were afraid that he would not commit to his studies and that this would negatively affect his life. Kaldas was unable to convince his family otherwise and was thus unable to pursue his musical interests for years to come. The self-taught musician continues to use a "musical shorthand" that he developed as a child, rather than employing traditional musical notation. However, the house was full of different music throughout the day, which Kaldas believed to be an important influence for him.

Kaldas developed a passion for artistic expression as early on as four years by imitating actors and actresses after watching films and plays shown on television. Upon turning sixteen, Kaldas sang a religious French song that launched his musical career.

He went to a French school in 1989, College des Freres, which had a great influence on his personality and expression that continued with him afterward.

In 2003, Kaldas studied Classical Singing at Cairo Opera House along with his studies at the architecture university. He was greatly inspired by the singer Asmaha, as she was an Arabic singer that could sing in different genres and styles and studied classical music.

== Music career ==
In 2000, Kaldas joined the French Christian Choir in Cairo. Soon after, he began performing in Egyptian venues and eventually around the world.

=== 2012: Living Abroad ===
After his nomination for the Peace Prize in Brussels in January 2012, and his performance in Paris afterward, Kaldas decided to live in France for some time to be able to learn new vocal techniques and start singing in different countries. Kaldas lived in Paris, Lille, and then moved to Cambridge and then London.

== Influences, music and concerts ==
=== Musical influences ===
From childhood, Kaldas accepted a wide variety of musical styles, listening to radio stations from Northern Africa, Arab countries, and Europe. His music has been said to reflect his encounters with cultures around the world.

The mixture in his family was translated through the choice of songs chosen by his family, as he was raised listening to Classical singing, Arabic, Greek, French, Italian, Spanish and English songs, along with the classical music. This mixture was expressed later through his talent and voice by always mixing different genres together and being one of the first musicians and singers in the Middle East creating fusion on stage.

Kaldas claims to have had a perfect pitch since childhood.

A single thought

I found it strange that people are fighting about God, who is going to win in the end and they forgot that God created us, how we can be separated from him, God lives inside us. if we remove the idea of the prize after death and live our life with love and peace with every human being knowing that we are one from one source, life will be great

— Concert's closing comments,
Live at Brussels
January 2012

=== Concerts ===
Kaldas sang cover versions of songs sung by Arabic superstars such as Fairuz, Abdel Halim Hafez, Mohamed Abdel Wahab, Umm Kulthum, and Nour Al Hoda. He has also sung covers from Charles Aznavour, Édith Piaf, Mireille Mathieu, Frédéric François, Jacques Brel, Elvis Presley, Frank Sinatra, and Nat King Cole.

- In 2005, he sang cover versions of songs from Umm Kulthum and Asmahan like "Raq el habeeb", "Gholbt asaleh", "Fakarouny", "Nawet adary alamy", "Emta hataeraf", "Layaly el ons", and "Ya layaly el bishr". He also sang cover versions of songs by the Lebanese singer Majida El Roumi like "Enta el mady", "Matra'ak bi alby", "Lawen maey el ayam", "Beirut set el donya", and "Am yesaalouny".
- In December 2006, he sang a concert of cover versions under the name of (Tony Kaldas sings Charles Aznavour) at Chateau de Ghouri in Egypt.
- Kaldas sang in some arias from Aria Antiche and opera roles like La Traviata and Tosca.
- In September 2007, he sang in a Common Concert with the soprano Maysa Orensa, a big repertoire containing Arabic, French, Italian, German songs at the Cairo Opera House
- In October 2007, he sang with the Egyptian singer Rania Shaalan in one of her concerts in Gomhoreya Theatre – Cairo Opera House
- Between 2006 and 2007, he did 3 religious songs and he wrote and sang a song about the Lebanese superstar Majida El Roumi as a dedication to her voice. The song was called "Negma men negoum el sama"
- On June 27, in The Opera House – Gomhoureya Theatre.
- On July 16 in Bibliotheca Alexandrina – Open Air Theatre.
- In September 2008, Kaldas performed at Diwan Bookstore a Ramadan Night, which was covered by the Daily News (Egypt)
- In 2009, he performed on 2 occasions in Smash Club, celebrating the Valentine's Day and Sham Ennessim.
- In June 2009, he commemorating the Lebanese writer Mansour Rahbani in El Sawy Culture Wheel, covered by OTV, ON TV, ANA TV and Nile Live TV, and media presses Elaph and radio stations.
- In September 2009, he performed a concert in Cairo Opera House singing for Fairuz, Halim and his own songs from Gibran Khalil Gibran words "You are my brother", "My soul"
- In 2011, Kaldas celebrated 70 years of "Bésame Mucho" with the help of the Mexican Embassy in Cairo for the copyrights and the song renewed with Arabic lyrics and a different arrangement mixing Jazz, Latin and Oriental.
- In 2011 after the Egyptian revolution, he released a song clip with the lyrics of Gibran for religious tolerance. The song was the official work for the International Day of Peace in 2011 and was shown on 25 channels around the world
- In 2012, he was nominated for the Music Peace Prize in Brussels.
- In 2012, Kaldas was chosen to be part of the music project "One Prayer" in Oslo, Norway in October.

== Honors, awards and distinctions ==
Kaldas was honored in Brussels European Parliament in 2012 and he was nominated for the Music Peace Prize Time for Peace; he was the first Arabic/Greek singer was nominated for this prize.

== See also ==
- Cairo Opera House
- list of Egyptians
