= Berlenti Abdul Hamid =

Egyptian actress (1935–2010)

Berlenti Abdel Hamid برلنتي عبد الحميد
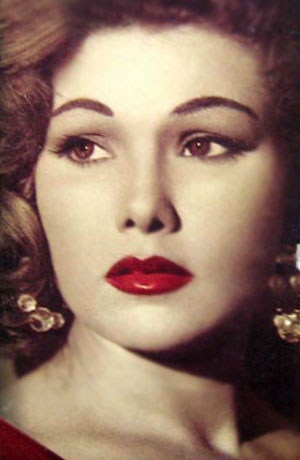
- Born: Nefisa Abdel-Hamid Hawass; 20 November 1935; Beni Suef, Kingdom of Egypt
- Died: 1 December 2010 (aged 75); Cairo, Egypt
- Occupation: Actress
- Years active: 1952–2010
- Spouse: Abdel Hakim Amer

Berlenti Abdel Hamid (Arabic: برلنتي عبد الحميد pronounced [beɾˈlænti ʕæbdel.ħæˈmiːd]) (20 November 1935 – 1 December 2010), born Nefisa Abdel-Hamid Hawass (Arabic: نفيسة عبد الحميد حواس), was a prominent Egyptian actress and an icon of the Egyptian cinema's golden age. She is known for her roles as a "temptress". She married Abdel Hakim Amer, the first vice-president of the former Egyptian President Gamal Abdel Nasser.

== Biography ==
Berlenti Abdel Hamid was born in 1935 in Beni Suef Governorate in Upper Egypt, and she is considered a well-known Egyptian actress.

== Death ==
Berlenti Abdel Hamid died in the Armed Forces Hospital after suffering a stroke.
