= Chased by the Dogs =

1962 film

- Directed by: Kamal El Sheikh
- Written by: Kamal El Sheikh; Sabry Ezzat; Naguib Mahfouz
- Based on: The Thief and the Dogs by Naguib Mahfouz
- Produced by: Gamal El Leithy
- Starring: Shadia; Shukry Sarhan
- Cinematography: Kamal Korayem
- Music by: Andre Ryder
- Distributed by: Dollar film
- Release date: 12 November 1962
- Running time: 125 minutes
- Country: Egypt
- Language: Arabic

Chased by the Dogs or The Thief and the Dogs (Arabic: اللص والكلاب, translit. El less wal kilab) is a 1962 Egyptian film directed by Kamal El Sheikh, based on the 1961 novel The Thief and the Dogs by Naguib Mahfouz. It was entered into the 13th Berlin International Film Festival. The film was also selected as the Egyptian entry for the Best Foreign Language Film at the 35th Academy Awards, but was not accepted as a nominee.

== Cast ==
- Shadia as Nour
- Shukry Sarhan as Saeed Mahran
- Kamal Al-Shennawi as Raouf Elwan
- Samir Sabri as Taleb
- Fakher Fakher
- Salah Mansour

== See also ==
- List of submissions to the 35th Academy Awards for Best Foreign Language Film
- List of Egyptian submissions for the Academy Award for Best Foreign Language Film
