= The Cursed Palace =

1962 Egyptian film

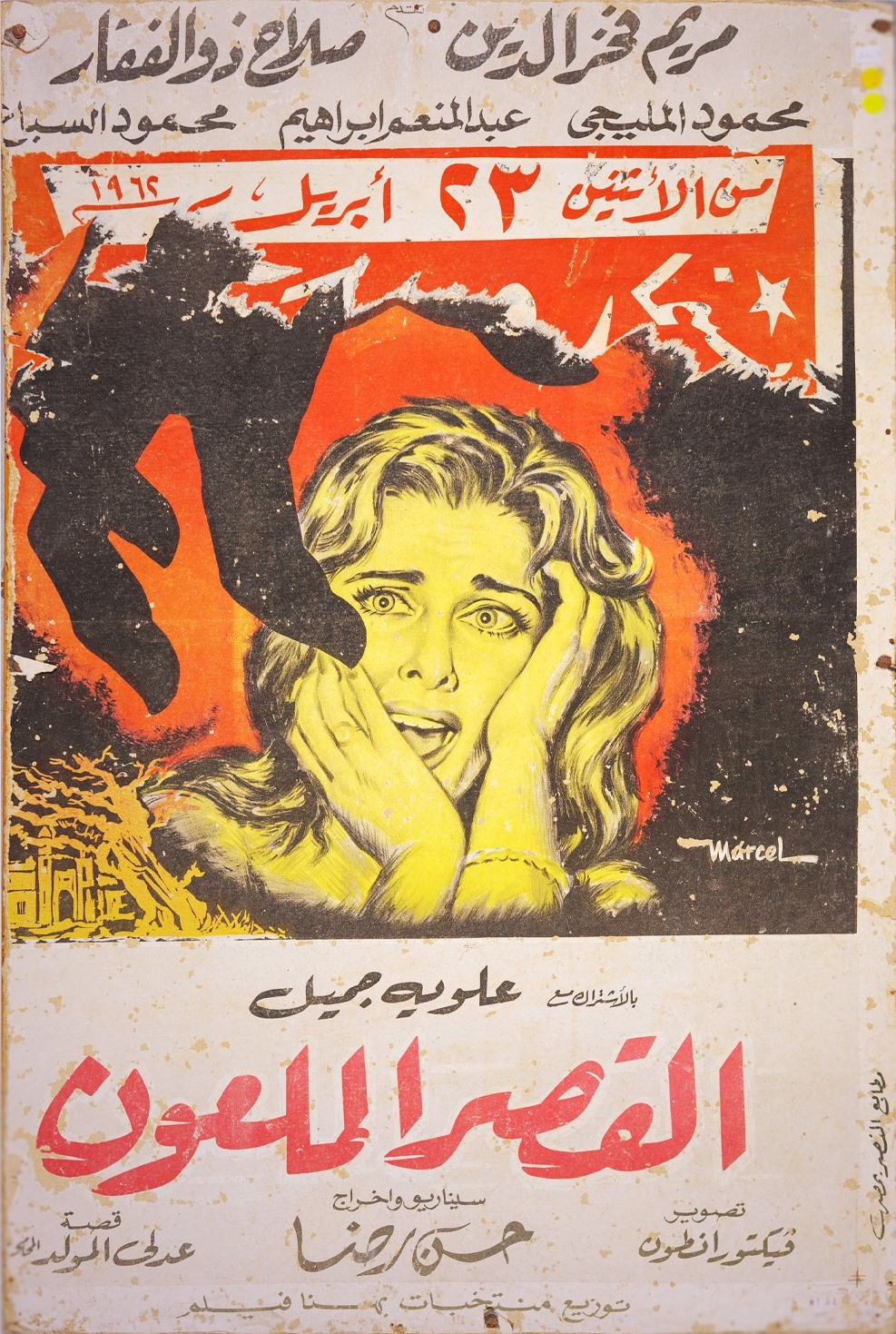
- Theatrical release poster
- Directed by: Hassan Reda
- Written by: Adley El Mowalled; Farouk Said; Hassan Reda
- Starring: Salah Zulfikar; Mariam Fakhr Eddine
- Cinematography: Victor Antoine
- Production company: Gomhoriya Film
- Distributed by: Bhanna Film
- Release date: April 9, 1962
- Running time: 90 minutes
- Country: Egypt
- Language: Egyptian Arabic

The Cursed Palace also known as The Accursed Castle (Arabic: القصر الملعون, translit: Al Qasr Al Mal’oun) is 1962 Egyptian horror film starring Salah Zulfikar, Mariam Fakhr Eddine and directed by Hassan Reda.

== Synopsis ==
Fahmy, a rich and paralyzed man, asked the young lawyer, Hassan, to make his will for him. When Hassan returned to present the will to Fahmy and found that he had changed his mind due to the appearance of some signs of madness on his daughter, who was constantly saying that she had seen someone kill her father in the dark, Hassan, with the help of his colleague Fathi, tried to find the secret key. He was suspected of Negeya and the palace servant's marina. The ghosts and strange sounds in the night made the atmosphere very tense, and after several incidents things gradually became clear. Fahmy's twin brother was recently released from prison, so he replaced his brother after he imprisoned him in a secret hall at the bottom of the palace to kill him in time. The criminal brother's plan fails at the last moment thanks to the vigilance of Hassan and his colleague, and the doors of happiness open before Hassan and Yousriya.

== Main cast ==
- Salah Zulfikar as Hassan
- Mariam Fakhr Eddine as Yousriya
- Mahmoud El-Meliguy as Fahmy
- Alwiya Gamil as Nageya
- Abdel Moneim Ibrahim as Fathi
- Thoraya Fakhry as Hassan’s mother
- Nahed Sabry as the dancer
- Qadria Qadri as Khairia
