= Fouad Haddad =

Egyptian poet

- فؤاد حداد
- Born: 1927; Cairo
- Died: 1985 (aged 57–58)
- Occupation: Actor

Fouad Haddad (Arabic: فؤاد حداد, romanized: Fuʼād Ḥaddād; 1927–1985) was an actor, who also wrote in the Egyptian vernacular.

== Life ==
Fouad Haddad was born in Cairo. His mother came from a Syrian family and his father was a Lebanese academic who later became an Egyptian citizen.

He joined the Egyptian Communist Party, and was jailed from 1953 to 1956 and 1959 to 1964. He collaborated with the composer Sayed Mekkawi, providing lyrics for Al-Masararati, a show broadcast on Egyptian National Radio and subsequently turned a television programme.

Fouad Haddad and his friend, the poet Salah Jaheen, were the subject of a 2011 television documentary by Dinah Hamza.
