= Ferdoos Mohammed =

Egyptian actress

Ferdoos Mohammed فردوس محمد
- Born: July 13, 1906; Egypt
- Died: September 22, 1961 (aged 55)
- Occupation: Actress

Ferdoos Mohammed (Arabic: فردوس محمد; 13 July 1906 in Egypt – 22 September 1961) was an Egyptian actress, famous for playing the role of a mother or a motherly figure in Egyptian films in the 1940s and 1950s.

== Partial filmography ==
- Ibn El-balad
- Fatma
- Ghazal Al Banat
- A Night of Love
- Sira` Fi al-Mina
- Wakeful Eyes
- The Leech
- Return My Heart
- Love and Adoration
- Al Liqa'a Al Akheer فيلم اللقاء الاخير (مع محمود الميليجي)
