= Magda el-Sabahi =

Egyptian actress (1931–2020)

Magda
- ماجدة
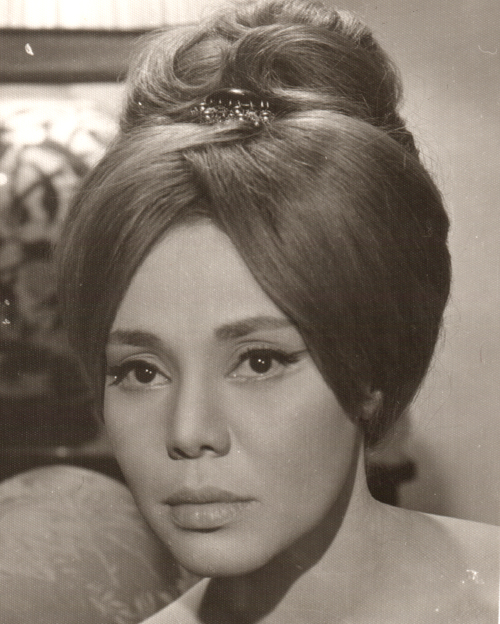
- Born: Afaf Ali Kamel Sabbahi; 6 May 1931; Tanta, Kingdom of Egypt
- Died: 16 January 2020 (aged 88); Cairo, Egypt
- Occupations: Actress; producer
- Years active: 1949–1994
- Spouse: Ihab Nafe (m. 1963; div. 1967)
- Children: 1
- Honours: Order of Sciences and Arts

Magda el-Sabbahi (born Afaf Ali Kamel Sabbahi; 6 May 1931 – 16 January 2020) was an Egyptian film actress and producer notable for her roles in Egyptian cinema from 1949 to 1994. With a career spanning almost five decades, Magda was prolific in the golden age of the Egyptian cinema as an actress and a producer. She appeared in 69 films garnering recognition both locally and internationally.

Born in Tanta, Gharbia to a wealthy family of Shebin El-Kom, Monoufia, Magda spent parts of her childhood in Shebin El-Kom. She attended boarding school. She then settled in Cairo in 1949 to pursue her acting career. During the 1950s, Magda established herself as a leading lady and one of the era's top stars with films like Injustice Is Forbidden (1954), Miss Hanafi (1954), Allah maana, (1955), Ayna Omri (1957), and Gamila l'Algérienne (1958). She continued her film career for three more decades, starring in successful films such as; Qays wa Laila (1960), El Morahekat (1961), Agazet Noss el Sana (1962), The Naked Truth (1963), Bayya'et el Garayed (1964), The Yemeni Revolution (1966), The Man Who Lost His Shadow (1968), El Naddaha (1975), and EL Omr Lahzah (1978). She continued to act irregularly until 1994, she died in 2020 in Cairo, at the age of 88.

== Early life ==
Afaf Ali Kamel Sabbahi was born on 6 May 1931 in Tanta, Her father was an employee in central of telephones of Tanta . Her mother, Nahed, tried to get rid of the fetus, an unwanted guest for her three siblings; Aida, Tawfiq, and Mustafa, but fortunately, her birth was uncommon. It fell on Sham El-Nessim, and the family considered it a good omen, especially since her father, Mustafa, had been promoted to a higher position in the Ministry of Transportation. They named the baby Afaf.

The El-Sabbahi family owned 12,000 acres and lavish palaces. Magda's paternal grandfather, Abdel Rahman Pasha El-Sabbahi, was a member of the Shura Council during the reign of Khedive Ismail. In an interview with Al-Ahali newspaper in 1985, Magda said, "My great-grandfather married four times and owned 30 Turkish and Ethiopian concubines." It was customary for a passenger to dismount when passing by the Sabahi Palace, as a sign of respect and politeness for the family's status. The feudal family supported Ahmed Orabi in his revolution, but the British persecuted them. Following the 1919 revolution, they lost some of their property and estates, according to Magda El-Sabahi's account in "Magda's Memoirs" by Sayed El-Harrani in 2016.

In her first year, Magda was involved in a drowning accident. She survived, but the effects remained with her until her last day: a fear of the sea. She would spend the summer with her family on the beaches of Ras El-Barr or Alexandria, clinging to the shore. She said, "As soon as I saw the sea, my soul sank, and that stayed with me throughout my life." Magda lived confined to her family's thoughts, despite her parents' separation. She produced, acted, and executed cinematic projects, opposed the nationalization of cinema, and featured leading men in her works.

== Career ==
She started her career at the age of 15 using a pseudonym, as she started acting without her family's knowledge. In the beginning of her career, Magda was distinguished by her performance of romantic roles and spoiled girls, but she was very intelligent, as when she succeeded in presenting these types of roles, she went to another area to present political roles, where she rose to prominence in this genre. Her first major role was in the 1949 film The Intelligent (El Naseh). In 1956, Magda founded her own film production company.

In 1958, she played the lead role in the film by Youssef Chahine, Jamila al Jaza'iriya (Jamila, the Algerian) opposite Salah Zulfikar and Ahmed Mazhar, the film was based on the story of Djamila Bouhired. In the 1961 film El Morahekat, Magda played the character of Nada, the teenager raised in a conservative family trying to find love and freedom.

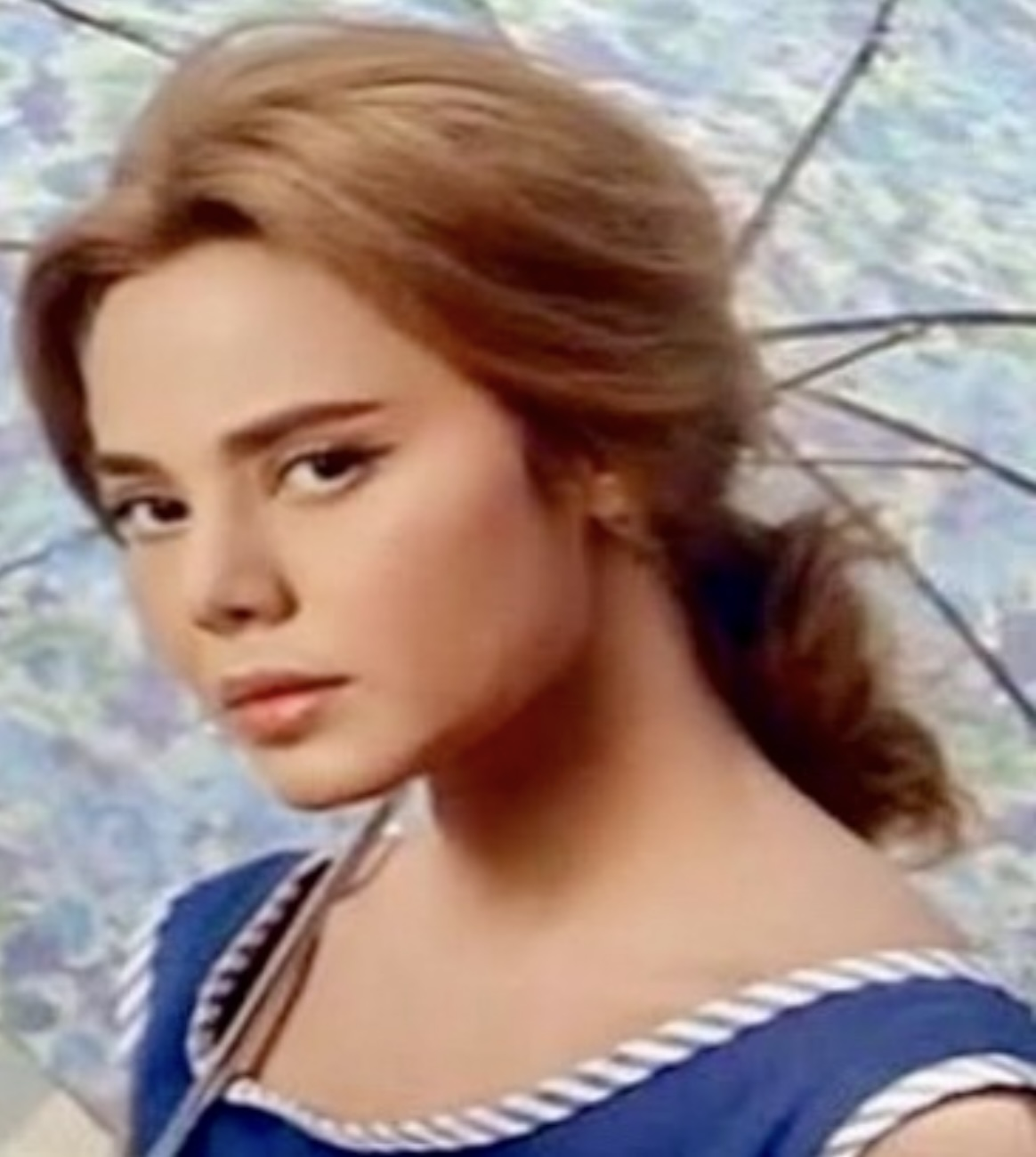
Magda in The Naked Truth (1963)

In the 1963 film The Naked Truth (El Haqeeqa El Areya), she played the character of Amal, a tourist guide who refuses to get married. When she meets Ahmed, an engineer who saves her from an accident, he engages her in a conversation about her beliefs. The film shows the remarkable renaissance of Egypt at the time. In 1968, she starred in a film by Kamal El Sheikh, The Man Who Lost His Shadow (El Ragol El-lazi fakad Zilloh) opposite Salah Zulfikar and Kamal El-Shennawi, the film was based on Fathy Ghanem's novel of the same name. She also starred in The Mirage (El Saraab) (1970), where she played the character of Rabab, who learns that her husband Kamel is sexually impotent. When they consult a doctor, the doctor learns that Kamel grew up as an introverted child who was strongly attached to his mother, making him develop some sort of the Oedipus complex.

In 1975, she starred opposite to Shoukry Sarhan in The Caller (El Naddaha), playing the character of an ignorant peasant coming to Cairo, to face the city life bring out her hidden ambitions and talents. In the 1978 film Life is a Moment (EL Omr Lahzah), she produced and starred in the dramatic war film about the 1973 war and its impact on Egyptian society.

In 1995, Magda was elected president of the Egyptian Women in Film Association. She was one of the greatest stars of Egyptian cinema, taking the lead role in sixty films. For her film career she took the stage name of Magda.

== Personal life and death ==
In 1963, she married the Egyptian intelligence officer and actor, Ihab Nafe, with whom she had her only daughter, Ghada, in 1965. Magda died in her house in Dokki, Cairo, on 16 January 2020, aged 88.

== Honours ==
Country	Honour
Egypt	Order of Sciences and Arts

== Selected filmography ==
- 1949: El Naseh
- 1952: Mostafa Kamel
- 1952: Immortal Song
- 1952: A Night of Love
- 1953: Dahab
- 1954: Injustice Is Forbidden
- 1954: Miss Hanafi
- 1955: Allah maana
- 1957: Ayna Omri
- 1958: Gamila l'Algérienne
- 1960: Qays wa Laila
- 1961: El Morahekat
- 1962: Agazet Noss el Sana
- 1963: The Naked Truth
- 1964: Bayya'et el Garayed
- 1966: The Yemeni Revolution
- 1968: The Man Who Lost His Shadow
- 1968: Hawaa ala Al Tareeq
- 1970: El Saraab
- 1975: El Naddaha
- 1978: EL Omr Lahzah
