= Youssef Fakhr Eddine =

Egyptian actor (1935–2002)

- يوسف فخر الدين
- Born: 15 January 1935; Heliopolis, Egypt
- Died: 27 December 2002 (aged 67); Athens, Greece
- Occupation: Actor (16 films)
- Years active: 1957–1980
- Spouse: Nadia Saif El-Nasr (m. 1969; died 1974)
- Relatives: Mariam Fakhr Eddine (sister)

Youssef Fakhr Eddine (Arabic: يوسف فخر الدين, 15 January 1935 – 27 December 2002) was an Egyptian actor and the brother of actress Mariam Fakhr Eddine.

His wife Nadia was killed in a car accident in 1974 which caused him a case of severe depression, and as a result he left acting and moved to live in Greece until the end of his life.

== Filmography ==
He appeared in 16 films from 1957 to 1980 including successful supporting roles such as the 1967 film titled "Beach of fun" (in Arabic "Chatei el marah") which starred Nagat El-Sagheera;

- Daerat al shak (1980)
- Harami el hob (1977)
- Al-khatafin (1972)
- Hekayet thalass banat (1968)
- Losos Lakn Zorafaa (1968)
- Beit el talibat (1967)
- Chatei el marah (1967)
- Endama nouheb (1967)
- Thalath Losoos (1966)
- El resala el akhira (1965)
- Awal hub (1964)
- Bayaat el jarayed (1964)
- Hub wa marah wa chabab (1964)
- Seraa el gababera (1963)
- El Hub Keda (1961)
- Amalekat el behar (1961)
- Rehla gharamia (1957)
