= Ahmed Mazhar =

Egyptian actor

Ahmad Mazhar
- أحمد مظهر
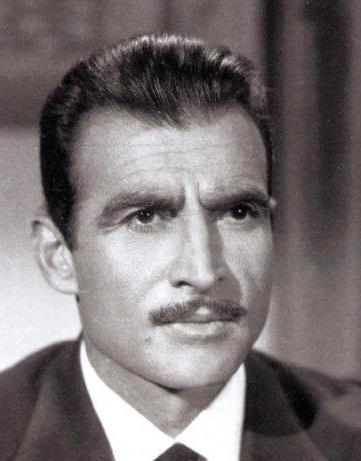
- Born: 8 October 1917; Cairo, Sultanate of Egypt
- Died: 8 May 2002 (aged 84); Giza, Egypt
- Occupation: Actor
- Years active: 1951–1997

Ahmed Hafez Mazhar (Note: Arabic: أحمد حافظ مظهر, Egyptian Arabic pronunciation: [ˈæħmæd ˈħɑːfezˤ ˈmɑzˤhɑɾ].) (8 October 1917 – 8 May 2002) was an Egyptian actor. He graduated from the military academy in 1938 and his colleagues included Gamal Abdel Nasser and Anwar Sadat.

== Career ==
His acting career started in 1951 when he was picked for a role in Zehour Al-Islam because of his riding skills and his proper pronunciation of classical Arabic. In 1957 he retired as commander of the special cavalry units and decided to explore his acting talents.

Mazhar's breakthrough in the world of acting came after he succeeded in playing the role of an evil prince in Ezz El-Dine Zulfikar’s Return My Heart (1957) alongside Shoukry Sarhan, Salah Zulfikar and Mariam Fakhr Eddine, his third movie. Other roles soon followed, including Jamila, the Algerian (1958) alongside Magda and Salah Zulfikar, Al-Tarik Al-Masdood (1958) opposite Faten Hamama, Al-Ataba Al-Khadraa (1959) opposite Ismail Yassine and Sabah. In addition to; Doaa al-Karawan (1959), Wa Islamah (1961), El-Dowa El-Khafet (1961) and Ghadan Youm Akhar (1961). He starred in an American movie, Cairo (1963), starring George Sanders and Faten Hamama. Followed by Saladin the Victorious (1963) opposite Salah Zulfikar, Nadia Lutfi, among others. Later, Mazhar appeared in Shafika and Metwali (1979) alongside Soad Hosny. Other films like Al-Nemr Al-Aswad, Demoue Sahebat El-Galalah, Al-Gasousa Hekmat Fahmy and The Guns and the Fury soon followed.

== Death ==
Ahmed Mazhar died at home at age 85 in Giza in 2002.

== Selected filmography ==
- Zuhour el Islam (1951)
- Rihlah Gharamiyyah (1957)
- Rod Qalby (1957)
- Port Said (1957)
- El tarik el masdud (1958) - Mounir (writer)
- El moallema (1958)
- Djamilah (1958) - Youssef
- Tarik el amal (1958)
- Hatta naltaki (1958)
- El zoja el azraa (1958) - Magdi
- Doa al karawan (1959)
- Nour el lail (1959)
- El hub el akhir (1959)
- El ataba el khadra (1959)
- Ana baria (1959)
- Abul eyoun garia (1959)
- Talat warissat (1960)
- Omm Ratiba (1960)
- Lawet el hub (1960)
- Hub fi hub (1960)
- Oh Islam (1961) - Mahmoud
- El dow' El khafet (1961)
- Waada el hub (1961) - Hamda
- Mala zekrayat (1961)
- Hayat wa amal (1961)
- Hayati hial taman (1961) - Hussein Abdulsalam
- Gharam el assiad (1961)
- Amalekat el behar (1961) - Officer Salah El Desoky
- Seraa el gababera (1962)
- I Will Not Confess (1962) - Ahmed (husband)
- Hira wa chebab (1962)
- Ghosn el zeitoun (1962)
- Ghadan yawmon akhar (1962)
- Cairo (1963) - Kerim
- El motamarreda (1963)
- El Naser Salah el Dine (1963) - Saladin
- Nar fi Sadri (1963)
- El Garima El Daheka (1963)
- El-Lailah el-Akhirah (1963) - Dr. Ahmed
- El aydi el naema (1963) - Shawkat Helmy
- El naddara el sawdaa (1963)
- El lahab (1964)
- Daani wal demouh (1964)
- Bint Antar (1964)
- El ainab el murr (1965)
- Lailat el zafaf (1966)
- El moraheka el saghira (1966)
- Cairo 30 (1966)
- Moaskar el banat (1967) - Hassan
- El lekaa el tani (1967) - Raafat
- Al moukhareboun (1967) - Adel
- Losos Laken Dhurafa'a (1968) - Hamed
- Noufouss haira (1968) - Rashwan
- Bint min el banat (1968)
- Ayyam el-hob (1968) - Sherif
- Akazib hawa (1969)
- Nadia (1969)
- Al-hob wal-Thaman (1970)
- Khatib mama (1970)
- Emberatoriet meem (1972)
- Kalimat Sharaf (1972)
- Al Shayma, Prophet's Sister (1972) - Begad
- Al-Ridaʼ al-Abyaḍ (1975) - Ahmad Fathi
- Genoun el hob (1977) - Mahmoud
- Al omr lahza (1978)
- Shafika and Metwali (1979)
- The Guns and the Fury (1981) - Sheik Khazal Khan
- The Black Tiger (1984)
- Al Etehad Al Nessai (1984)

== See also ==
- List of Egyptian films of the 1950s
- List of Egyptian films of the 1960s
