= Mariam Fakhr Eddine =

Egyptian actress (1933–2014)

- مريم فخر الدين
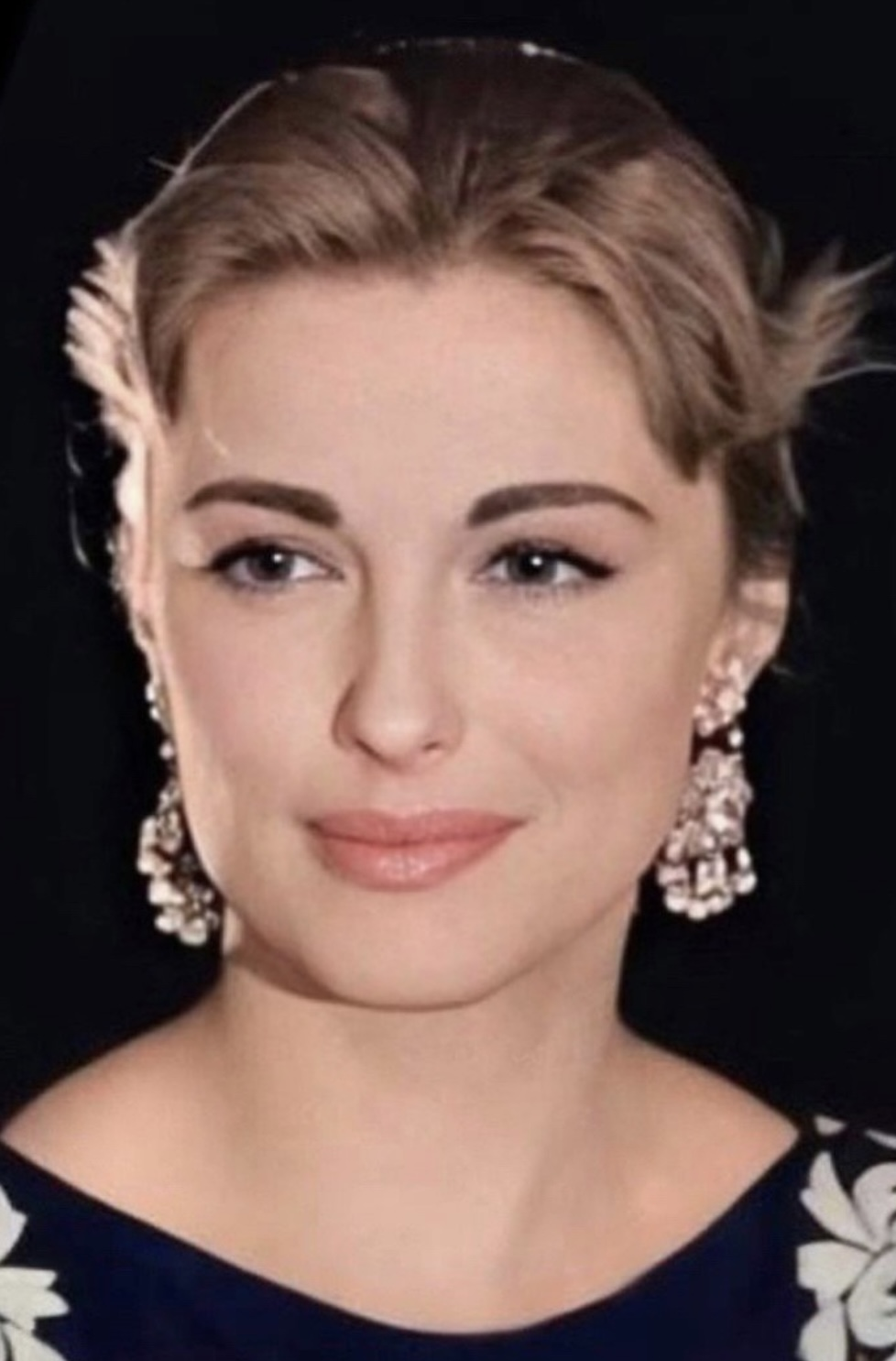
- Mariam Fakhr Eddine in 1958
- Born: Mariam Mohamed Fakhr Eddine; 8 September 1933; Faiyum, Egypt
- Died: 3 November 2014 (aged 81); Cairo, Egypt
- Other name: "Beauty of the Screen"
- Occupation: Actress
- Years active: 1951–2014
- Spouses: Mahmoud Zulfikar (m. 1952; div. 1960) Mohamed El Taweel (m. 1961; div. 1965) Fahd Ballan (m. 1967, divorced) Sherif Al Fadhali (div.)
- Children: 2
- Relatives: Youssef Fakhr Eddine (brother)

Mariam Mohamed Fakhr Eddine (Arabic: مريم محمد فخر الدين, 8 September 1933 – 3 November 2014) was an Egyptian film and television actress, and was the second wife of prominent filmmaker Mahmoud Zulfikar (1914 – 1970). She was nicknamed the "Belle of the Screen" (Arabic: حسناء الشاشة). Before pursuing a career in acting, she won the title of Most Beautiful Face in a pageant organised by the French-language magazine Image.

She was discovered by director Mahmoud Zulfikar, her future husband. Mariam Fakhr Eddine's first film appearance was in the 1951 film A Night of Love and she went on to appear in the films such as Return My Heart (1957), Sleepless (1957), The Cursed Palace (1962) and Soft Hands (1963).

== Early life ==
Mariam Fakhr Eddine was born in Faiyum, Middle Egypt to a strict Upper Egyptian father and a Hungarian mother. Her younger brother is actor Youssef Fakhr Eddine (1935–2002). She was educated at a German high school.

== Career ==
Before pursuing a career in acting, she won the title "Most Beautiful Face" in a pageant organised by the French-language magazine Image. She was discovered by film director Mahmoud Zulfikar, whom she married in 1952. She gave birth to their daughter, Iman. Her first film appearance was in the 1951 film A Night of Love. The film was entered into the 5th Cannes Film Festival.

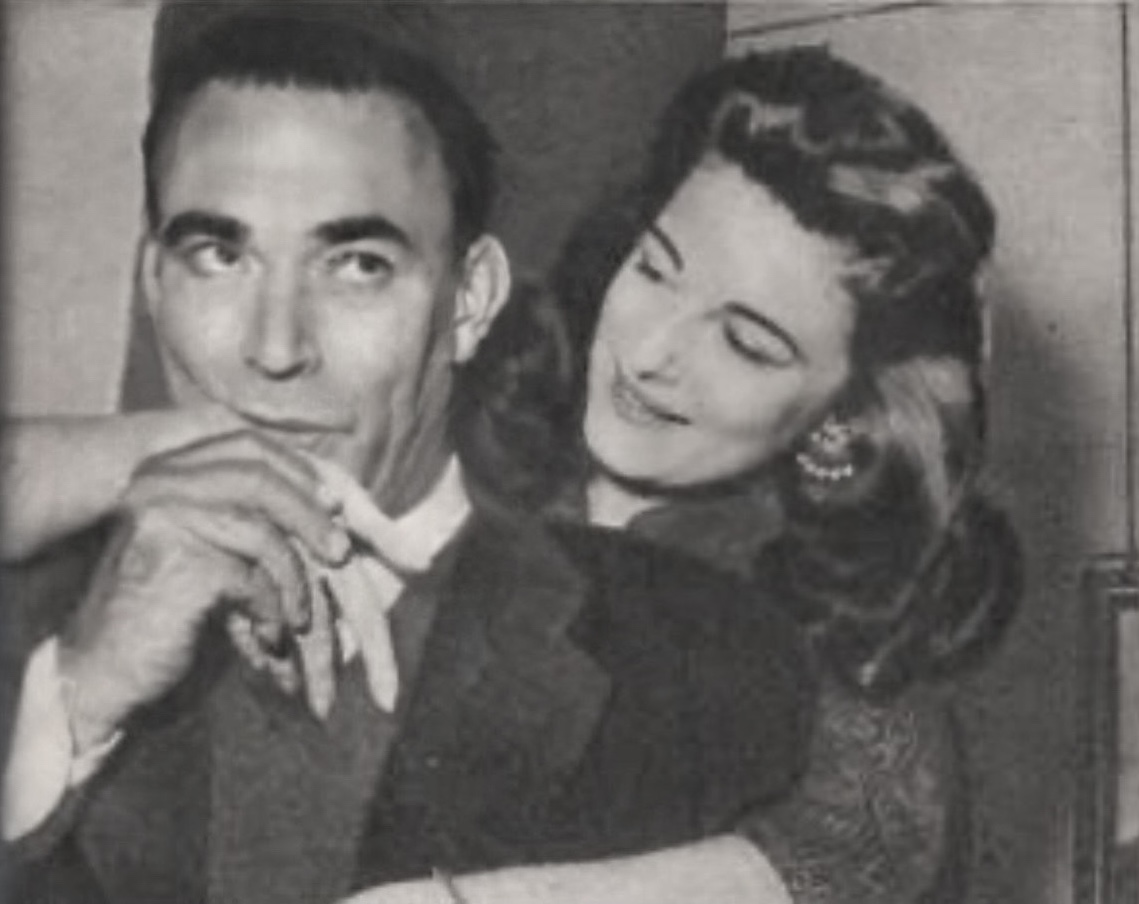
Mariam Fakhr Eddine with her husband Mahmoud Zulfikar in 1960

In the late 1950s and early 1960s, she initially found success in larger sentimental roles before transitioning into portraying matriarch late in her career. Salah Zulfikar was a favorite leading man of her to work with, and she partnered with him in thirteen films. She went on to appear in the films The Murderous Suspicion (1953), The Good Land (1954), The Love Message (1954), A Window on Paradise (1954), Return My Heart (1957), Rendezvous with the past (1961), The Cursed Palace (1962), Soft Hands (1963), El-Asfour (1972) and Secret Visit (1981).

Mariam Fakhr Eddine in Souq el-harim (1969)

In 2007, Mariam Fakhr Eddine was cast as Mrs. Aida in the French-Canadian romantic drama film Whatever Lola Wants. She attended the Alexandria International Film Festival in 2009. Until her death in 2014, Fakhr Eddine appeared in more than 200 films. Her younger brother, Youssef Fakhr Eddine, was also a leading actor.

== Death ==
A few months after brain surgery, Fakhr Eddine died on 3 November 2014, at the Maadi Armed Forces Hospital in Cairo. Following a religious funeral held at the Maadi Military Hospital Mosque, she was buried in 6th of October City, Giza Governorate.

== Filmography ==
=== Film ===
Year	Film	Role	Notes
1951	Lailat gharam		
1953	El shak el katel		
1954	Shaytan al-Sahra		
1954	Nafiza alal janna		
1954	El Ard el Tayeba		
1954	Resalet Gharam	Elham	
1956	El ghaeba		
1957	Rehla gharamia		
1957	Hareb minel hub		
1957	Rodda qalbi	Princess Ingi	
1958	La anam	Safia	
1959	Nour el lail		
1959	Malish gherak	Bassina	
1959	Kalb min dahab		
1959	Hekayat hub		
1959	Gharimet hub		
1959	El hub el samet		
1960	Malaak wa Shaytan		Guest Appearance
1960	El imlak		
1960	Abu Ahmad		
1960	El banat waal saif		
1961	Maww’ed Ma El Maady		
1961	Wahida		
1961	Mala zekrayat		
1962	Al Qasr Al Mal’oun		
1963	Narr fi sadri		
1963	Soft Hands		
1969	Souq el-harim		
1970	Al-wadi el-asfar		
1972	El-asfour		
1972	Leilet hob akhira		
1973	Zekra Lailat Hubb		Guest Appearance
1973	Shellet el-moraheqin		
1974	Wa kan el hob		
1976	Daqqit qalb	Mona's mother	
1977	Harami el hob		
1978	Al-Raghba w Al-Thaman		
1981	Zeyara Serreya		Olfat
1983	El-azraa wa el-shaar el-abyad		
1985	Basamat fawk al-maa		
1986	Wl-zeyara el-akhira		
1996	El noom fi el asal	Madame Zizi	
2001	El hob el awel	Rania's grandmother	
2007	Whatever Lola Wants	Mrs. Aida	
2010	Aytl Jensen, une vie de cinéma		Documentary

=== Television ===
Year	Title	Role	Notes
1987	El-Hubb Fi Haqeeba Diplomacia		
2000	Opera aida		
