= Salah Jahin =

Egyptian poet and cartoonist

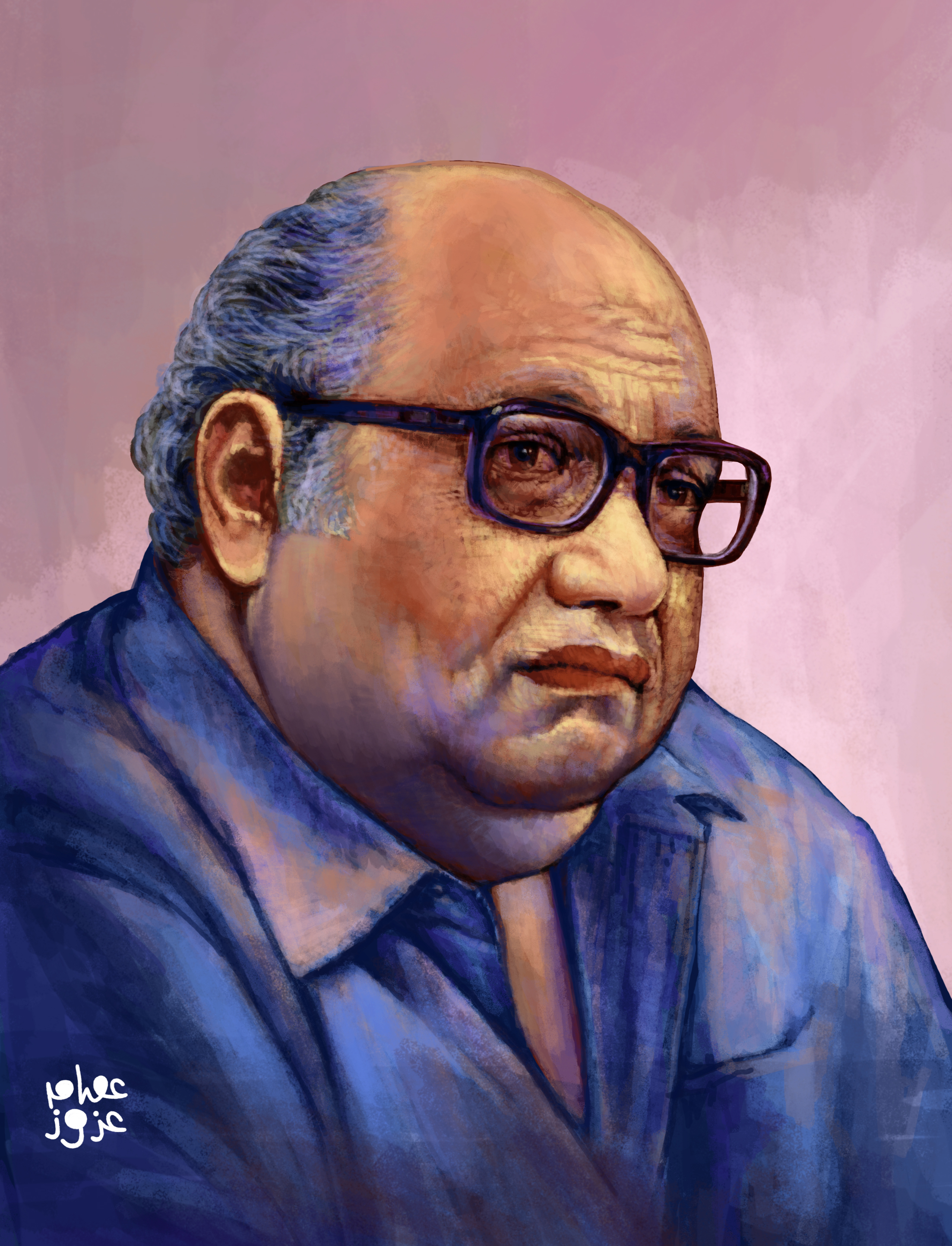
- Born: December 25, 1930; Cairo, Kingdom of Egypt
- Died: April 21, 1986 (aged 55); Cairo, Egypt
- Occupations: Poet, lyricist, playwright and cartoonist
- Writing career
- Language: Egyptian Arabic
- Years active: 1955–1986

Muhammad Salah Eldin Bahgat Ahmad Helmy (محمد صلاح الدين بهجت أحمد حلمى, IPA: [mæ'ħæmmæd sˤɑˈlɑːħ el-, edˈdiːn ˈbæhɡæt 'æħmæd ˈħelmi]), known as Salah Jaheen (صلاح چاهين [sˤɑˈlɑːħ ʒæˈhiːn]; December 25, 1930 – April 21, 1986) was a leading Egyptian poet, lyricist, playwright and cartoonist.

== Life and career ==
Jaheen was born in Shobra district, Cairo in 1930 to a middle-class family. He studied law in Cairo University. In 1955, he started working for the Egyptian weekly magazine "Rose al-Yousef" as a cartoonist. A year later, he moved to the new magazine "Sabah el-Khair" for which he became the editor-in-chief, then he joined Al-Ahram.

Together with Fuad Haddad, Jaheen had a great role in development of Egyptian colloquial poetry. In fact, the term "shi'r al-ammiya" or "Arabic colloquial poetry" was only coined in 1961 by a group of young poets including Salah Jahin, Abd Al-Rahman Abnudi, Fuad Qaud and Sayyid Higab who called themselves "Jama't Ibn Arus". Before that, poetry in colloquial Egyptian Arabic was regarded as a folkloric and low art produced by and for the uneducated masses, while the term "Shi'r" (Arabic for poetry) was restricted to poetry written in Modern Standard Arabic (commonly known as "Fuṣḥā", meaning most eloquent).

He wrote several plays for the puppet theatre. He was also known for his nationalist and patriotic songs that marked the revolutionary era of Gamal Abdel Nasser role, many of which were performed by the famous Egyptian singer Abdel Halim Hafez. The poet was highly inspired by the 1952 Revolution and was sometimes known as the semiofficial poet of the revolution. However, after Egypt's defeat in the 1967 war and Gamal Abdel Nasser death in 1970 he suffered from a severe depression. In one interview, he said that with the death of Nasser in 1970 and the sudden shift in political orientation he felt increasingly like Hamlet, with Sadat embodying the treacherous Claudius.

In addition to political poetry, Jahin's poems frequently contain metaphysical and philosophical themes, questioning the purpose of human life, the nature of good and evil, human and divine will and the limits of human pursuit of freedom and happiness.

In 1965, Jaheen was awarded the Egyptian Order of Science and Arts of the First Class. He died in 1986 at the age of 55.

== Works ==
=== As a poet ===
==== Ruba'iyat (Quatrains) ====
In 1963 Jaheen wrote his quatrains or rubaiyat in which he expressed his beliefs, emotions and views of life, existence, good and evil. Each verse ended with one ironic expression "Agabi" or "how strange !". Quatrains are sometimes argued as the greatest popular poetic achievement in Egypt in the last 50 years.

==== In Egypt's Name ====
In 1971, Jaheen wrote "Ala Esm Masr" or "In Egypt's name", an epic poem narrating the history of Egypt, from the pharaoic era till present. Each verse ended with the same expression "Ala esm Masr" or "In Egypt's name" but each time holding a new meaning. In this poem Jaheen repeatedly expressed his love for his country. In one stanza, he says:

"History may say what it wishes in Egypt's name
Egypt, for me, is the most beloved and most beautiful of things.
I love her when she owns the earth, east and west.
And I love her when she is down, wounded in a battle.
I love her fiercely, gently and with modesty.
I hate her and curse her with the passion of the lovesick.
I leave her and flee down one path, and she remains in another .
She turns to find me beside her in misfortune.
My veins pulsating with a thousand tunes and rhythms.
In Egypt's name."

===== Other books =====
His other books of colloquial poetry include:

- An al-qamar wa al-teen (1961).
- Qasaqis Waraq, (1966).
- Dawawin Salah Jahin, (1977).
- Angham Siptambirriyah, (1984).

==== Song writer ====
Jaheen wrote the lyrics of many songs, mostly patriotic songs that were performed by Abdel Halim Hafez. His songs include: "Soura" or photo, "ehna elsha'b" or "we are the people", "Khaly elselah sahy" or "oh weapon, be ready", "Ya ahlan belma'arek" or Welcome battles" and "El-mas'oulia" or "Responsibility". He wrote for the puppet theatre, including the famous operetta "El-leila el-kebira" or The Grand Night. Jaheen also worked as a film producer, screenwriter and an actor. His screenplays included: "Awdat al ibn al dal" or The return of the prodigal son; directed by Youssef Chahine, "El less wal kilab" (based on the novel The Thief and the Dogs by Naguib Mahfouz), "Shafika we Metwali" or "Shafika and Metwali", "Khally ballak men Zouzou" ("Watch Out for Zouzou") and "Amira Hoby Ana" or Amira My Sweetheart. In the latter two, the famous Egyptian actress Suad Husni sang some of her most beautiful songs: "Ya wad ya te'eel", "Khally ballak men Zouzou" or "Take Care of Zouzou", "El-hayah ba'a lonha bamby" or "Life has turned pink" and "El-donia rabe'" or "It's spring time". He also wrote the script and lyrics for the "Riddles"-a television series with a riddle in each episode presented during the month of Ramadan in the Egyptian and Arab televisions- for several successive years and for the television serial "Howa wa heya" or "He and She" portrayed by Ahmad Zaki and Suad Husni. 2010, The Egyptian Singer Tony Kaldas composed a song from his lyrics and sang it in a new different style, in a classical way with Piano.

=== Political Cartoonist ===
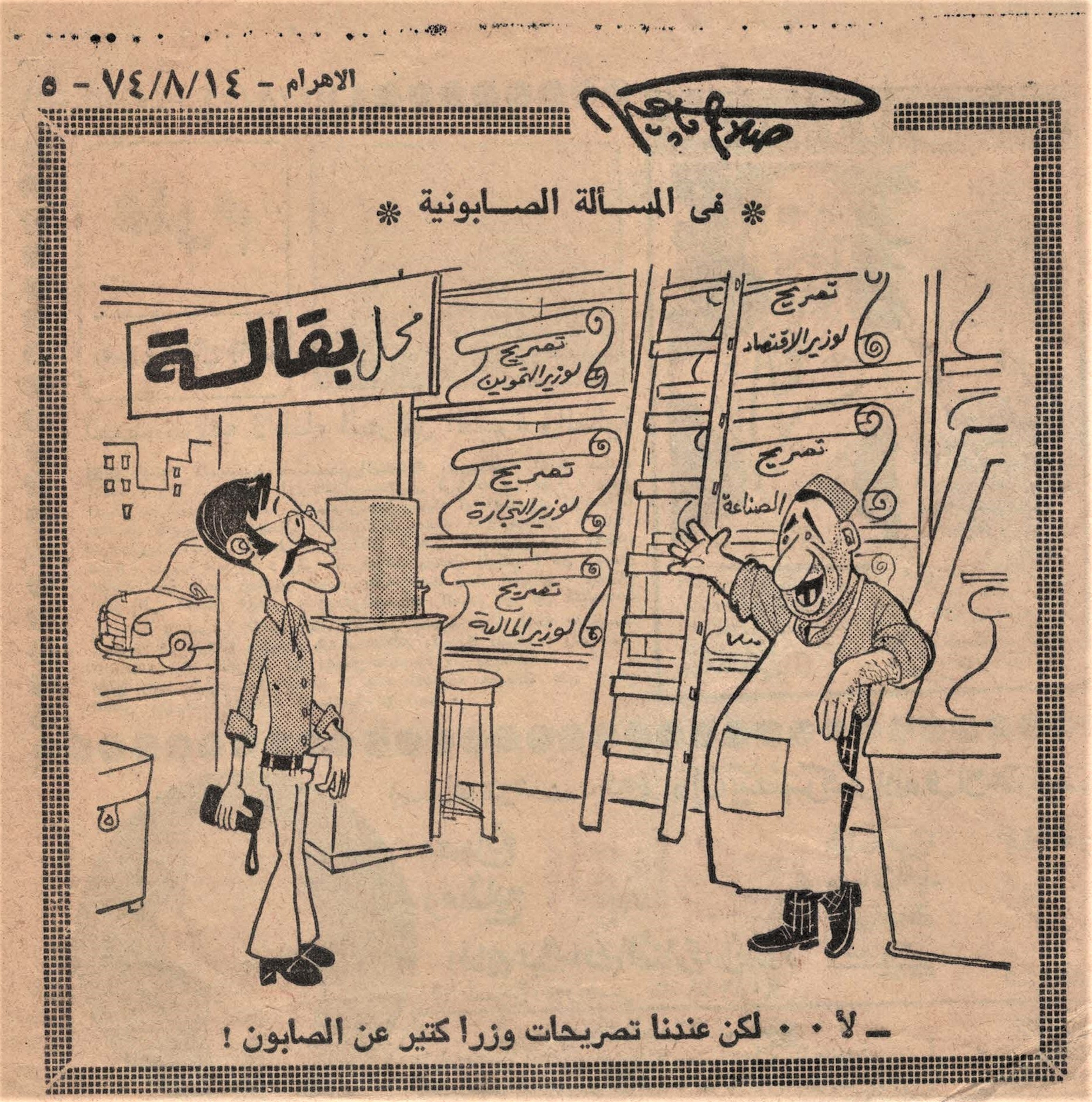
'On the Soap Question', a wry Salah Jahin cartoon published in Al-Ahram in 1974

Jahin was a witty political cartoonist, where his sketches of everyday life over the course of four decades "made people laugh and cry at the same time." His drawings were a mainstay of Al-Ahram's daily editions form the 1960s until his death in 1986, and at least two volumes published collections of his work in 1986, and 2013. Jahin's original sketches have also been exhibited.

==== Trivia ====
A Google Doodle on 25 December 2013 commemorated Jahin's 83rd birth anniversary.
