= Ahmed Diaa Eddine =

Egypt film director (1912–1976)

- Born: 1912
- Died: 1976 (aged 63–64)
- Education: Leonardo da Vinci Institute
- Occupation: film director

Ahmed Diaa Eddine (1912–1976) was an Egyptian film director. He directed over 30 films and studied at the Leonardo da Vinci Institute in Cairo.
