= Hussein Riad =

Egyptian actor (1897–1965)

- حسين رياض
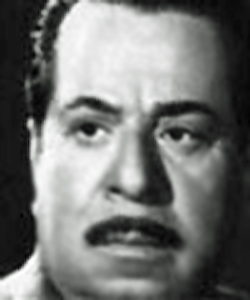
- Hussein Riyad in 1960s
- Born: 13 January 1897; Cairo, Egypt
- Died: 17 July 1965 (aged 68); Cairo, Egypt
- Occupation: Actor
- Years active: 1920–1965
- Awards: Egyptian State Award and Medal of Science and Arts, 1963
- Honours: Order of the Republic - Grand Cordon

Hussein Mohamed Shafiq (Arabic: حسين محمد شفيق, more commonly known by his stage name Hussein Riad (Arabic: حسين رياض, (1897–1965)) was an Egyptian actor, who mainly played "dad roles". His career spanned about 46 years and he appeared in approximately 320 films, 240 theater plays, and 150 radio and 50 TV plays.

== Early life ==
Riad was born Hussein Mohamed Shafiq (Arabic: حسين محمد شفيق) in 1897 in the Al-Sayeda Zaynab district of Cairo, Egypt, to an Egyptian father and a Syrian mom. He later changed his name to Hussein Riad. His brother was into acting too, he was the artist Mohamed Fouad (known by his stage name Fouad Shafiq). In 1916, he quit school to start acting and joined the Arab Acting Institute.

== Career ==
By 1923, Riad worked with Youssef Wahbi's Theatrical Troupe as well as other notable actors. Thereafter, in 1926, Riad started working in silent films. During his career, Riad was known as the "father of affection" in many of his roles and participated in many famous works in Egyptian cinema, such as The Good Land, Return My Heart, Jamila, the Algerian, Among the Ruins, Love and Adoration, Forbidden Women, Dearer than My Life, The Mamelukes and Saladin the Victorious.

== Awards ==
In 1963, he received the Egyptian State Award and Medal of Science and Arts.

== Death ==
Riad died on July 17, 1965, of a heart attack. In 2019, his daughter, Fatima, published a book about his life, acting career and death, and dedicated it to all his fans.
