= Shoukry Sarhan =

Egyptian actor (1925–1997)

ORE Shoukry Sarhan
- شكري سرحان
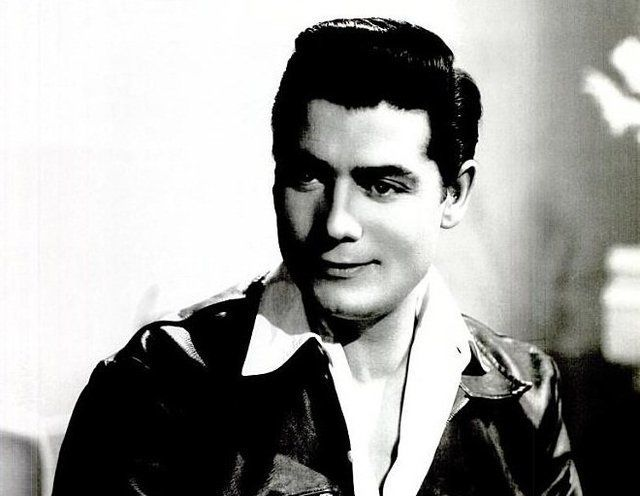
- Sarhan in 1962
- Born: Mohammed Shokry Sarhan; 13 March 1925; Sharqia, Kingdom of Egypt
- Died: 19 March 1997 (aged 72); Cairo, Egypt
- Occupation: Actor
- Notable work: Return My Heart
- Honours: Order of the Republic - Grand Cordon

Mohamed Shoukry El Husseiny Sarhan (13 March 1925 – 19 March 1997, Arabic: محمد شُكري الحسيني سرحان, romanized: Muḥammad Shukrī al-Ḥusaynī Sirḥān), better known as Shoukry Sarhan (Arabic: شُكري سرحان, romanized: Shukrī Sirḥān), was an Egyptian actor. He is regarded as one of the greatest Egyptian actors of all time.

== Life and career ==
Sarhan was born in El Sharqiya, Egypt on 13 March 1925. He graduated from the "High Institute of Acting in Egypt" in 1947. In 1949, Sarhan acted in his first movie, Lahalibo (لهاليبو, "Lahaleebo"). His rise to stardom was in 1951 when Youssef Chahine, a famous Egyptian film director, chose him for the lead role in the movie Son of the Nile (ابن النيل, "Ibn El-Nil"). In 1957, he starred in Ezz El-Dine Zulficar's Return My Heart (رد قلبي, "Rodda Qalbi"). His notable films included Mahmoud Zulfikar's The Unknown Woman (المرأة المجهولة, "Al-Mar'a Al-Maghoola") Kamal El Sheikh's Chased by the Dogs (اللص والكلاب, "Al-Less wal Kelab") among many others.

Sarhan had earned the title "The young man of the screen". He received several awards throughout his career. President Gamal Abdel Nasser honored Sarhan with the Order of the Republic. In 1984, he received a Best Actor's award for his lead role, with Faten Hamama, in the movie Lelt El qabd 'Ala Fatema (ليلة القبض على فاطمة, "The Night of Fatima's Arrest"), which was directed by Henry Barakat.

During the celebrations of the centennial of cinema he was nominated by Egyptian critics as the best actor of the century in Egypt, having participated more than any other actor in The Greatest 100 Egyptian films.

Sahran's last movie was El-Gablawi (الجبلاوي) in 1991. He died on 19 March 1997, aged 72, in Cairo.
