= Khadra and the Southern Sinbad =

- خضرة والسندباد القبلي
- Directed by: El-Sayed Ziada
- Written by: Mahrous Ziada; El-Sayed Ziada (screenplay and dialogue)
- Produced by: Mahrous Ziada; El-Sayed Ziada
- Starring: Doria Ahmed; Kamal el-Shennawi; Abbas Fares; Mahmoud el-Meliguy; Zouzou Shakib; Mahmoud Shokoko; Hassan Fayek
- Cinematography: Ferry (François) Farkash
- Edited by: Kamal Abul Ela (chief editor); Muhammad Mokhtar (assistant editor)
- Music by: Mohamed Ihsan; Ibrahim Hussein; Sami Naasan; Omar el-Gizawy; Mahmoud al-Sharif
- Production companies: El-Nasr Films (Mohamed Hassan Ramzy and Partners
- Release date: December 2, 1952
- Running time: 127 minutes
- Country: Egypt
- Language: Arabic

Khadra and the Southern Sinbad (Arabic: خضرة والسندباد القبلي, transliterated as Khadra wa Sindibad el khebli) is an Egyptian musical comedy drama film released on December 2, 1952. The film is directed by El-Sayed Ziada, features a screenplay he has co-written with his brother Mahrous, and stars Kamal el-Shennawi, Doria Ahmed, Mahmoud el-Meliguy, Mahmoud Shokoko, and Hassan Fayek. The central character, Mohsen, becomes mentally ill when he learns of his daughter's death from his estate manager, Zaki. Zaki gets in trouble when he sees Khadra and kidnaps her, erroneously thinking her to be his long-lost cousin and Mohsen's daughter.

== Cast ==
- Kamal el-Shennawi (Fouad Bey)
- Doria Ahmed (Khadra)
- Mahmoud el-Meliguy (Zaki Bey, Mohsen Bey's nephew)
- Mahmoud Shokoko (al-Fahlawi)
- Hassan Fayek (tribal Sinbad)
- Zouzou Shakib (Fifi, Zaki's friend)
- Abbas Fares (Mohsen Bey, a madman)
- Reyad el-Kasabgy (Abu Hadwa)
- Ali al-Kassar (Bashir's uncle)
- Hassan El Yamany (Nylon)
- Galal Sadiq (Galal, Fifi's brother)
- Safa al-Jamil (Gamil)
- Hussein Ibrahim
- Afaf Shaker (Lola Bey)
- Abdo Youssef
- Mahmoud al-Rashidi
- Hassan Atla
- Ahmed Abo Abeya
- Sami Naasan
- Kamel al-Shabasi
- Wahba Hassaballah
- Dongal (Ajami Abdelrahman)
- Yaqoub Tanios
- Omar el-Gizawy
- Nabaweya Moustafa (dancer)
- Liz and Lyn (dancers)

== Synopsis ==
A wealthy man named Mohsen Bey (Abbas Fares) suffers from mental illness, and his young nephew Zaki Bey (Mahmoud al-Meliguy) secures a court appointment as his uncle's guardian. Zaki treat's Mohsen's staff harshly and threatens to sack them all, so Mohsen's butler al-Fahlawi (Mahmoud Shokoko) hurriedly telegrams the virtuous young Fouad (Kamal el-Shennawi), the business manager for the estate, to bring the fellahin’s rent back quickly to keep it out of Zaki’s clutches. On the train, Fouad meets a peasant girl named Khadra (Doria Ahmed) and her father (Hassan Fayek), the latter an admirer and imitator of Sinbad the Sailor who calls himself the “Southern Sinbad.” Fouad gives Khadra his address in case she needs help in Cairo.

Fouad arrives at Mohsen's house and finds Zaki, who has hired his friend Fifi (Zouzou Shakib) and her brother Galal (Galal Sadiq) to help manage the estate. Fouad introduces Khadra to Mohsen as his daughter “Lula,” who traveled to Brazil a long time before. Zaki hires gangster Abu Hadwa (Reyad el-Kasabgy) to kidnap Khadra but Fouad calls the police and they free her. Khadra encounters many difficult situations impersonating her Brazilian character, but the real Lola Bey (Afaf Shaker) arrives and clears up the misunderstanding.

== Songs ==
The songs include lyrics by El-Sayed Ziada and Fathi Qura with music by Mohamed Ihsan, Ibrahim Hussein, Sami Naasan, Omar el-Gizawy, and Mahmoud al-Sharif.

Songs in score
Title	Singer
“يا قطن مصر” (“O Cotton of Egypt”)	Omar el-Gizawy
“ادي النعيم” (“Valley of Bliss”)	Galal Sadiq, Doria Ahmed
“واحده وواحده يساوي اتنين” (“One Plus One Equals Two”)	Mahmoud Shokoko
“ول يا ول” (“Well, Goodbye”)	Doria Ahmed
“واه يابوي” (“Wow Daddy”)	Doria Ahmed
“على عيني” (“In My Eyes”)	Doria Ahmed

Ziad Assaf wrote in the 2017 article, “درية أحمد، صوت المرح في الأغنية السينمائية” (“Doria Ahmed, the Voice of Whimsy in Film Music”), in the Jordanian newspaper Al Ra’i that:

Doria Ahmed’s marriage to director El-Sayed Ziada paved the way for her to enter the world of cinema…She starred in the Khadra films…in which her songs were used to dramatic effect…We feel the lightness and joy in her songs, through which she expresses the whimsical nature of her character.

== Reception ==
According to critic Samir Farid in the entertainment ezine Shahrayar Stars:

Actress Doria Ahmed turned out a stellar performance as the character of Kadra…we forget the simple machinations of the plot to lose ourselves in the comic talents of Shokoko, El-Shennawi, Doria Ahmed, and even Omar el-Gizawy and Nabaweya Moustafa in the cotton harvest dance…The film features a screenplay by Mahrous Ziada…is directed by El-Sayed Ziada…and was a domestic success.

In Al-Wafd, Samar Medhat praised singer-actress Ahmed:

Best-known for the movie Khadra and the Southern Sinbad, she gained renown for songs like “Valley of Bliss”; “اه يا بوي آه يا نا” (“Oh, Oh, Boy, Oh, Oh Na”); and “ل يمين ول شمال سنتر فرويد سنتر هاف” (“Right and North of the Centre-half”), a vivid description of a 1950’s association football match.
