= Mimi Chakib =

Egyptian actress (1913–1983)

- ميمي شكيب
- Born: Ameena Chakib; 25 December 1913; Cairo, Sultanate of Egypt
- Died: 20 May 1983 (aged 69)
- Occupation: Actress
- Years active: 1934–1983
- Spouse: Siraj Munir

Ameena "Mimi" Chakib (or Shakib; Arabic: أمينة ميمي شكيب; 25 December 1913 – 20 May 1983) was an Egyptian actress. She mostly played secondary roles and appeared in more than 150 films between 1940s and the early 1980s.

== Career ==
She entered film in 1934 and appeared in films such as Nahwa al-Majd in 1949 and Mahmoud Zulfikar’s Virtue for Sale in 1950. She co-starred in Doa al karawan in 1959 alongside actors such as Faten Hamama and Ahmed Mazhar. She appeared in El Hub Keda in 1961 in which she appeared alongside actors such as Salah Zulfikar and Sabah as well as the 1966 film Three Thieves. Her career was at its peak in the 1940s.

She was featured in her last film appearance in the 1982 film An Egyptian Story.
