= Mohammed El-Bakkar =

- Born: Mohammed El Bakkar; 1913; Lebanon, Ottoman Empire
- Died: 8 September 1959 (aged 45–46) Pawtucket, Rhode Island, United States

Mohammed El-Bakkar (Arabic: محمد البكار; died in Pawtucket, Rhode Island, United States, September 8, 1959) was a Lebanese tenor, oud player, and conductor.

El-Bakkar was a noted tenor and appeared in several Arabic-language films, mostly in the Egyptian cinema. He appeared in Mahmoud Zulfikar's My Father Deceived Me (1951). He moved to the United States in 1952 and lived in Brooklyn. He released several LPs of Arabic music in the United States. He also played a singing oriental rug salesman in the Broadway musical Fanny, in the Oriental bazaar scene; the production ran from 1954 to 1956.

El-Bakkar died of a cerebral hemorrhage on September 8, 1959, at the age of 46, after collapsing while performing at an annual Lebanese American festival in Lincoln, Rhode Island.

== Discography ==
- Port Said: Music of the Middle East, Vol. 1 (Audio Fidelity) (w/Nejla Ates on album cover)
- Sultan of Bagdad: Music of the Middle East, Vol. 2 (Audio Fidelity)
- Music of the African Arab: Music of the Middle East, Vol. 3 (Audio Fidelity)
- The Magic Carpet: Music of the Middle East, Vol. 4 (Audio Fidelity)
- Dances of Port Said: Music of the Middle East, Vol. 5 (Audio Fidelity)
- Exotic Music of The Belly Dancer: Music of the Middle East, Vol. 6 (Audio Fidelity)
- Music for a Belly Dancer (Audio Fidelity)
