= Forgive My Sins =

- اغفر لي خطيئتي
- Directed by: El-Sayed Ziada
- Written by: Aziz Armani; El-Sayed Ziada (screenplay and dialogue)
- Produced by: Paul Mouradian
- Starring: Kamal el-Shennawi; Shoukry Sarhan; Samira Ahmed; Zouzou Mady; Hassan Hamed
- Cinematography: Zakaria Mansour
- Edited by: Fikri Rostom
- Music by: Abdul Majeed al-Sharif
- Production company: Eastern Renaissance Films
- Distributed by: United Films (Sobhi Farhat)
- Release date: April 1, 1963
- Running time: 85 minutes
- Country: Egypt
- Language: Arabic

Forgive My Sins (Arabic: اغفر لي خطيئتي, transliterated as Khozni bi ari) is an Egyptian film released on April 1, 1963. The film is directed by El-Sayed Ziada, features a screenplay by Aziz Armani, and stars Kamal el-Shennawi, Samira Ahmed, and Zouzou Mady. The plot concerns Hussein, a wealthy scion, who falls in love with clothing factory worker Laila, who is forced into prostitution which destroys their relationship.

Originally entitled خذني بعاري (“Take Me Naked”), the film was renamed at the censors’ request.

== Cast ==
- Kamal el-Shennawi (Hussein)
- Samira Ahmed (Laila)
- Zouzou Mady (Hussein's mother)
- Hassan Hamed (Muntasir)
- Fayza Fouad (Sana, Hussein's fiancée)
- Khayria Ahmed (Etidal, Laila's sister)
- Said Khalil (Salama, Laila's father)
- Ahmed Ghanem (Mazloum)
- Rowaida Adnan (Ahlam, Mazloum's wife)
- Mohamed Shawky (Sharaf, a pimp)
- Widad Hamdi (maid)
- Samir Wali al-Din (Sheikh Ali)
- Nahed Samir (Umm Khalil, a matchmaker)
- Amal Yousry (Nousa, Muntasir's friend)
- Ahmed Abo Abeya
- Ahmed Tharwat
- Safa al-Jamil
- Shahira Kamal
- Qadriya Askar
- Hadiya (dancer)

== Synopsis ==
Hussein (Kamal el-Shennawi) lives in a mansion with his cousin and fiancée Sana (Fayza Fouad), his wealthy mother (Zouzou Mady), his cousin (Rowaida Adnan), and her husband Mazloum (Ahmed Ghanem). Hussein, a junior employee, relies on his mother's largesse to fund his pleasures, renting a flat he shares with his poor employee Sheikh Ali (Samir Wali al-Din) and uses to entertain with his friend Muntasir (Hassan Hamed).

Hussein's mother brings her cousins to the mansion to spend the summer, kicking Mazloum out whereupon he joins Hussein and Muntasir's life of dissipation, much to the chagrin of Sheikh Ali, who wants to marry a traditional woman and assigns matchmaker Umm Khalil (Nahed Samir) to find him one. Hussein and Muntasir take advantage of the situation to befriend the cousins. Muntasir befriends Nousa (Amal Yousry) and impregnates her while Hussein goes to Umm Khalil's house to see pictures of candidates. Hussein meets the beautiful young Laila (Samira Ahmed, who works in a clothing factory and is forced to prostitute herself for money to a pimp named Sharaf (Mohamed Shawky) since her alcoholic father, Salama (Said Khalil), drinks away the money she brings in from her legitimate job.

Hussein falls in love with Laila and abandons alcohol and his ne’er-do-well friends. Though he wants to marry her, he fears his mother's reaction given her humble family and decides to propose to her at the factory, only to see her leave with Sharaf and a strange man. Realizing Laila's other profession, Hussein returns to his life of debauchery, only for Muntasir to hire none other than Laila to comfort him. Hussein slaps her and she cries and breaks off her relationship with Sharaf.

Muntasir suggests that Hussein is simply another john, but Hussein embraces her and forgives her in return for her promises in his bed to turn over a new leaf. Hussein's mother cuts her off from financial assistance and fires him from his job. Salama tries to sell her to an acquaintance (Ahmed Tharwat) to pay off a debt, and she jumps off a balcony to escape, falling to her death.

== Censorship ==
Then-Minister of Culture Tharwat Okasha had assigned lawyer and film critic Mustafa Darwish to the role of official State Censor. In his 2003 book أربعون سنة سينما (“Forty Years of Cinema”), Darwish wrote:

The Minister of Culture was taking incoming fire, and among the sharpest barbs were the prospect of a film called Take Me Naked being released, though the name was only a reference to the shameful collapse of the United Arab Republic in the 1961 Syrian coup d'état. Since I was not aware of the Board of Censors’ unwillingness to see the film, the Minister called me on the phone to watch the film and withdraw its license. Had it been my choice, I would not have renamed the film or withdrawn the license, sparing the censors a fierce debate over wasting producers’ time and sacrificing Egyptian cinema on the altar of momentary whims. Director El-Sayed Ziada would have made his films on contract, and I learned not to acquiesce blindly to censorship.
