= Towards Glory =

- Poster for domestic release
- Arabic: Nahwa al-Majd (نحو المجد)
- Directed by: Hussein Sedki
- Written by: Hussein Sedki; Muhammad Kamel Hassan; Abdelhamid Younes
- Starring: Hussein Sedki; Faten Hamama; Kamal Al-Shennawi
- Cinematography: Alevise Orfanelli
- Release date: 1949
- Country: Egypt
- Language: Arabic

Nahwa al-Majd (Arabic: نحو المجد, romanized: Naḥwa l-Majd, IPA: [naħwa lˈmadʒd]), known in English as Towards Glory, is an Egyptian 1949 romance film directed by and starring Hussein Sedki. The film also featured Faten Hamama and Kamal Al-Shennawi as co-stars.

== Plot ==
After Khalid's father abandons his family for another woman, he falls in love with Suhair, a friend. He struggles to overcome his personal challenges and consequently succeeds in graduating from a law school. After deciding to take up work in the farm owned by Suhair's family, a bitter relationship is caused between him and Suhair's father. Khalid manages to win the case, and finally marries Suhair, who had supported him all along.

== Cast ==
- Hussein Sedki as Khalid
- Faten Hamama as Suhair
- Kamal Al-Shennawi as Khalid's father
- Ahmed Allam
- Mimi Chakib
- Mahmoud Shokoko
- Lola Sedki
- Mokhtar Othman
- Mohamed El Deeb
- Su'ad Makkawi
- Gracia Kassin
