= My Father Deceived Me =

1951 film directed by Mahmoud Zulfikar

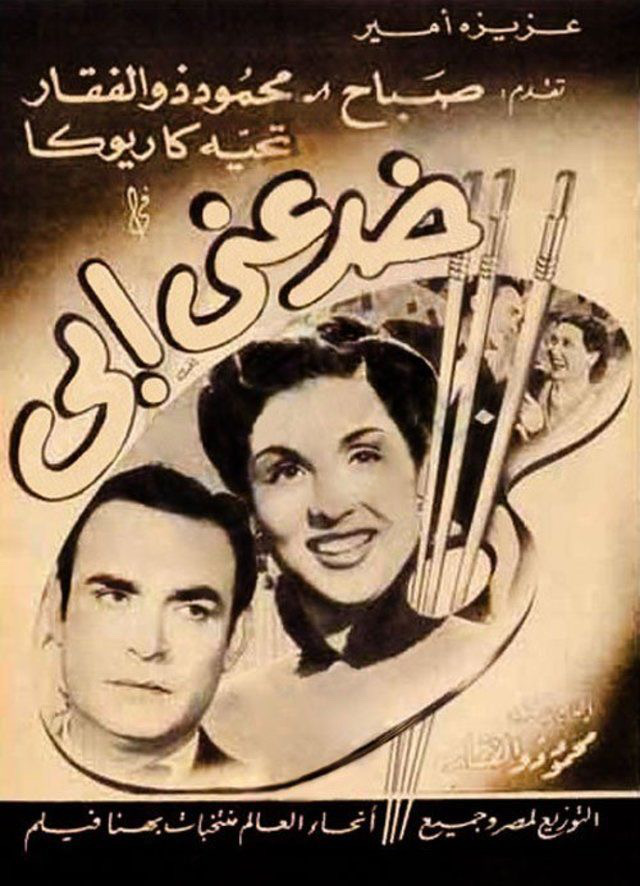
- Theatrical poster
- Arabic: خدعني أبي
- Directed by: Mahmoud Zulfikar
- Written by: Mahmoud Zulfikar; Aziza Amir
- Screenplay by: Mahmoud Zulfikar
- Produced by: Mahmoud Zulfikar
- Starring: Mahmoud Zulfikar; Sabah; Taheyya Kariokka
- Cinematography: Mostafa Hassan
- Edited by: Albert Naguib
- Music by: Andre Ryder
- Production companies: Mahmoud Zulfikar films; Aziza Amir films
- Distributed by: Bahna films
- Release date: 19 April 1951 (Egypt)
- Running time: 120 minutes
- Country: Egypt
- Language: Egyptian Arabic

My Father Deceived Me (aliases: My Father Tricked Me Arabic: خدعني أبي, translit. Khadaini abi) is a 1951 Egyptian film written, directed by and, starring Mahmoud Zulfikar, Sabah and Taheyya Kariokka.

== Plot ==
Kawthar is a girl who works in the telephone service, and is in love with Mamdouh, a poor young man. Mamdouh proposes to marry Kawthar, but her father refuses and sees that she must marry Shaaban, the rich man, and under her father's pressure, Kawthar marries Shaaban, and lives in his villa in which she resides with him and his daughter who has a mental illness. One of the misfits tries to kill Shaaban, but by chance Mamdouh saves him from fate, and Shaaban could not reward him except by entrusting him with managing the casino he owns, in a confrontation between Kawthar and the villa's maid, the maid declares to her that she is Shaaban's wife, and this is a secret between them, and she also told her that Shaaban, this rich man, is nothing but a forger of money. Others he controls so as not to reveal his secret, Kawthar manages to report Shaaban and brings the police to arrest him and his gang, but the maid rushes and kills Shaaban, and at the end Mamdouh marries Kawthar.

== Crew ==
- Directed by: Mahmoud Zulfikar
- Story: Mahmoud Zulfikar, Aziza Amir
- Screenplay: Mahmoud Zulfikar, Aziza Amir
- Dialogue: Saleh Gawdat
- Director of Photography: Mostafa Hassan
- Editing: Albert Naguib
- Production: Mahmoud Zulfikar films – Aziza Amir films
- Distribution: Bahna films
- Songwriting: Bayram al-Tunisi, Fathi Kora
- Songs composed by: Farid Ghusn, Ahmed Sidqi, Youssef Saleh, Mohammed El-Bakkar

== Cast ==
=== Primary cast ===
- Mahmoud Zulfikar: (Mamdouh)
- Sabah: (Kawthar)
- Taheyya Kariokka: (the Dancer Taheyya)
- Stephan Rosti: (Shaaban Bey - Kawthar's husband)
- Zahret El-Ola: (Naima - daughter of Shaaban)
- Nigma Ibrahim: (Fatima)
- Mahmoud Shokoko: (Crusoe - Mamdouh's friend)
- Mohammed El-Bakkar: (singer Bakkar)
- Herimin: (show dancer)
- Mohammed Sobeih: (waiter)
- Abdul-Ghani El-Nagdi: (Seller of Robabikia)
- Sanaa Samih: (Rajaa - Kawthar's aunt)
- Mohsen Hassanein: (from the gang)
- Abdel Moneim Bassiouni: (employee)
- Abdulaziz Ahmed: (Kawthar's father)

=== Supporting cast ===
- Selim Bastawy
- Thoraya
- Abdul Moneim Ismail
- Muhammed Hassan Dawood
- Kamel Othman Kanti
- Inshirah El-Alfi
- Nadia El-Sabaa
