= Miss Fatimah =

Miss Fatimah الأستاذة فاطمة
- Theatrical release poster
- Directed by: Fatin Abdel Wahab
- Written by: Ali El-Zorkani
- Produced by: Mahmoud Zulfikar
- Starring: Faten Hamama; Kamal Al-Shennawi
- Cinematography: Waheed Hamed
- Music by: Fouad El Zahiri
- Production company: Amir Film (Mahmoud Zulfikar)
- Distributed by: Nile Cinema
- Release date: February 21, 1952
- Running time: 105 minutes
- Country: Egypt
- Language: Egyptian Arabic

Miss Fatimah (Arabic: الأستاذة فاطمة, English: The Lawyer Fatimah, translit. Al-Ustazah Fatimah) is a 1952 Egyptian comedy film written by Ali El-Zorkani, directed by Fatin Abdel Wahab and produced by Mahmoud Zulfikar. It stars Faten Hamama and Kamal Al-Shennawi.

== Plot ==
Fatimah (Faten Hamama) is law student that graduates from law school and starts her own law firm. In law school she meets Adel (Kamal Al-Shennawi), another student, and the two share a romantic relationship. The movie highlights the difficulties that working women suffered during that period in the Egyptian society. One of Adel's clients involves him in a crime. Adel becomes a suspect but by the support and defense of Fatimah, he gains his freedom. After winning the case, Fatimah and Adel marry.

== Cast ==
- Faten Hamama
- Kamal El Shennawi
- Abdelfattah El-Qosary
- Lula Sedki
- Saeed Abu Bakr
- Abdel Wareth Assar
- Riad El-Qasabgi
- Salah Nazmi
