= Rola Saad =

Lebanese singer (born 1978)

Rola Saad رولا سعد
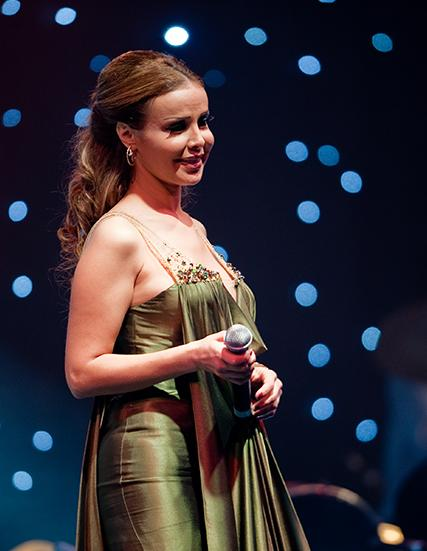
- Rola Saad in 2010

Background information
- Born: Rola Youssef Saad رولا يوسف سعد; 25 August 1978 (age 47); Beirut, Lebanon
- Genres: Arabic pop music
- Occupation: Singer
- Years active: 2000s–present

Rola Youssef Saad (Arabic: رولا يوسف سعد; born 25 August 1978) is a Lebanese pop singer who emerged in the mid-2000s known for her collaboration with Lebanese singer Sabah.

== Biography ==
Saad was born in Beirut, Lebanon. She entered show business first as a model, appearing in fashion ads, most notably for "Habibi" and "Dallou'a" perfumes, as well as landing roles in two music videos by Saber Rebaï ("Etzakkarak" and "Hayyarouni"). Her musical beginnings were with the record label Alam al Phan. She also opened a fashion company "R with Love" with her elder sister. Her biggest hit was a cover of the Sabah classic "Yana Yana", with Sabah making a cameo in the video. The song became a success in 2006, topping sales charts. She was in the movie Room 707 and in 2011 she participated in the series Sayeen Dayeen.

== Discography ==
=== Albums ===
- 2004: Aala Da Elhal
- 2007: Kol El Gharam
- 2009: Al Fostane Al Abyad
- 2012: Sings Sabah

=== Singles ===
- Doq El Khishab
- Amout W Shouf
- Bi Edak Ana
- Hobla
- Habibi
- Eih Dah Eih Dah
- Meen Elly Shaghil Balak
- Ya Majnouna
- Doq El Khishab
- Excuse Me
- Keteer Bejin Aleik
