= Badi' Khayri =

- بديع خيري
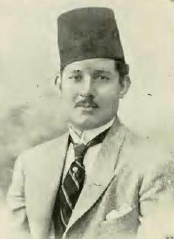
- Born: August 18, 1893; Cairo, Khedivate of Egypt, Ottoman Empire
- Died: February 1, 1966 (aged 72); Cairo, United Arab Republic
- Occupations: Lyricist; playwright
- Years active: 1912–1966

Badīʻ Khayrī (Note: Also Anglicized as Badie Khairi.) (Arabic: بديع خيري; 18 August 1893 – February 1966) was an Egyptian folk lyricist and playwright. He was one of the folk lyricists who took their words and inspiration from old traditional Egyptian folk stories and popular street songs sung by the masses in festivities. Khayri wrote several stories for films such as The Will (1939), El Hub Keda (1961) and Fatma (1947), which he wrote the dialogue.
