= Ibn El-balad =

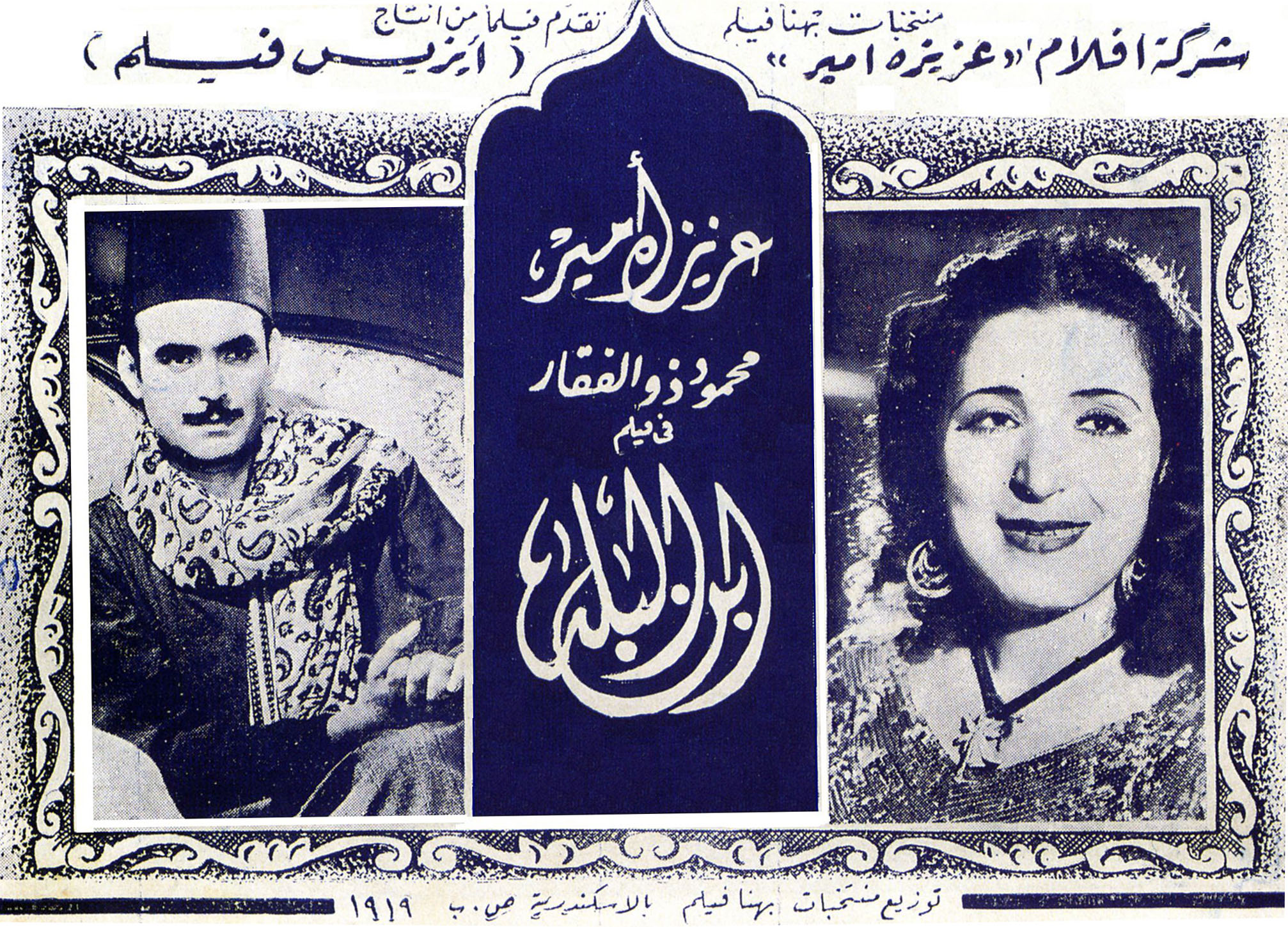
- Theatrical release poster
- Directed by: Stephan Rosti
- Written by: Mahmoud Zulfikar; Aziza Amir; Stephan Rosti; Mohammed Tewfik
- Screenplay by: Mahmoud Zulfikar
- Starring: Mahmoud Zulfikar; Aziza Amir
- Cinematography: Hassan Zaher
- Edited by: Galal Mostafa
- Music by: Riad Al Sunbati; Mahmoud Ismail
- Production company: Isis Films
- Distributed by: Bahna Films (domestic); Nahas Film (worldwide)
- Release date: 29 October 1942 (Egypt)
- Running time: 105 minutes
- Country: Egypt
- Language: Egyptian Arabic

Ibn El-balad (Arabic: إبن البلد translit: Ibn El-balad; aliases: The Noble Man, or The Urchin or The Son of the Country) is a 1942 Egyptian film, directed by Stephan Rosti and starring Mahmoud Zulfikar and Aziza Amir.

== Plot ==
A contractor forces his daughter Fathia (Aziza Amir) to marry Azmi Bey (Mahmoud El-Meliguy), who covets her money while the other covets his money. Fathia gets to know the engineer Mahmoud (Mahmoud Zulfikar), whose workshop was lost in the Scandinavian raids. Mahmoud can run the factories that she inherited from her father when they were idle. Azmi pretends to be keen on his wife's money. When he senses that he is almost losing her, Fathia asks for a divorce, and after much trouble, she gets divorced and finally marries Mahmoud, the love of her life.

== Cast ==
- Mahmoud Zulfikar
- Aziza Amir
- Mahmoud El-Meliguy
- Bishara Wakim
- Stephan Rosti
- Dawlat Abyad
- Zuzu Shakib
- Ferdoos Mohammed
- Mohsen Sarhan
- Mohammed Tawfik
- Scheherazade
- Ramses Naguib
- Mohamed Kamel
- Abdel Hamid Zaki
