= The Pretty Mothers-in-law =

1953 film by Helmy Rafla

El Hamawat El Fatenat
- Directed by: Helmy Rafla
- Screenplay by: Abo El Seoud El Ebiary
- Produced by: Assia Dagher
- Starring: Kareman; Kamal el-Shennawi; Ismail Yasin; Mari Moneeb
- Distributed by: Lotus
- Release date: 1954
- Running time: 91 minutes
- Country: Egypt
- Language: Arabic

El Hamawat El Fatenat (Arabic: الحماوات الفاتنات, English: The Pretty Mothers-in-law) is a 1954 Egyptian film about a couple who get married, played by Kamal El Shennawy and Kareman, and get into daily arguments and conflicts with each other because they share a roof with their mothers-in-law.

== Plot ==
Samir is a handsome young man in his mid-twenties. He works at a construction company and marries Nabila, the woman he has always loved.

Only days after their marriage, Nabila’s mother decides to come and live with them in the same house. Samir’s mother feels jealous, and decides she should also have that “privilege”. Naturally, the two mothers-in-law begin arguing about different things and life at home becomes chaotic. So, Samir (played by Kamal El Shennawy) decides to get a groom for his mother-in-law so she can leave the house. When he finally got her a groom, his mother did her best to try to get Nabila on her side. Again they start fighting over him until Nabila and his mother decide to leave the house and stay away for a few days.

Nabila is pregnant at the time and when she is about to give birth, Samir gets into trouble with his company and ends up in prison for a couple of days. Nabila gives birth, travels to be by his side and leaves her child in the care of her mothers-in-law. When Samir finishes his time in prison, they get the shocking news that a car hit their child. The movie ends with the scene of everyone in the hospital and the mothers-in-law confesses that they are indeed the cause of many of the problems and so they promise to leave them alone in peace.

== Cast ==
- Kamal el-Shennawi as Samir
- Kareman as Nabila
- Ismail Yasin as Bahgat
- Mari Moneeb as Samir's mother
- Mimi Shakeeb as Nabila's mother
- Abd El Salam El Nabulsi

== See also ==
- Ismail Yasin
- Abdel Salam Al Nabulsy
- Cinema of Egypt
- Cinema of Egypt
