= Asfouriyeh Hospital =

Former hospital in Lebanon

Asfouriyeh Hospital was an institution that provided services related to mental and nervous disorders in Lebanon.

== History ==
It was founded in 1896 by a Swiss Quaker missionary in Lebanon, which at that time was within the borders of the Ottoman Empire. The hospital was one of the first modern psychiatric hospitals in the Middle East and provided significant services to the mentally ill in the region.

During the Lebanese Civil War, the hospital faced great difficulties. Despite many challenges such as the abduction of hospital staff and patients, violence, and the destruction of buildings, the hospital continued to care for patients. However, the devastating impact of the civil war led to the hospital's closure in 1982.

== In popular culture ==
Asfouriyeh Hospital is referenced in the song Al Asfouriyeh (عالعصفورية) by Lebanese singer Sabah. The hospital's name is also used metaphorically in Lebanese political discourse, such as Prime Minister Najib Mikati's 2022 remark expressing hope that the opposition would not reach the "Asfouriyeh stage."
