= El Ard el Tayeba =

1954 film directed by Mahmoud Zulfikar

- Arabic: الأرض الطيبة
- Directed by: Mahmoud Zulfikar
- Written by: Mahmoud Zulfikar
- Screenplay by: Mahmoud Zulfikar; Youssef Gohar
- Produced by: Mahmoud Zulfikar
- Starring: Mariam Fakhr Eddine; Kamal el-Shennawi
- Cinematography: Mostafa Hassan
- Edited by: Albert Naguib
- Music by: Andre Ryder
- Production company: Amir Film (Mahmoud Zulfikar)
- Distributed by: National Company for Distribution and Trade
- Release date: 31 May 1954 (Egypt)
- Running time: 120 minutes
- Country: Egypt
- Language: Egyptian Arabic

El Ard el Tayeba (aliases: The Good Land or The Good Earth, Arabic: الأرض الطيبة, translit. Al-Ard Al-Tayyiba) is a 1954 Egyptian film written, directed and produced by Mahmoud Zulfikar.

== Synopsis ==
Saadia discovers that she is the daughter of a rich man and has a huge inheritance after his death. Her stepmother Baheega hates her, specially after Saadia became a rich girl. Baheega plots to kill Saadia to win her inheritance with the help of her lover and her brother. Here come the good man Hussein to rescue her.

== Crew ==
- Directed by: Mahmoud Zulfikar
- Story: Mahmoud Zulfikar
- Screenplay: Mahmoud Zulfikar, Youssef Gohar
- Production: Mahmoud Zulfikar
- Editing: Albert Naguib
- Production company: Amir Film (Mahmoud Zulfikar)
- Distribution: National Company for Distribution and Trade

== Main cast ==
- Mariam Fakhr Eddine as Saadia
- Kamal El-Shennawi as Hussein Heshmat
- Hussein Riad as El Pasha
- Zuzu Madi as Baheega
- Abdel Salam Al Nabulsy as Zaki
- Soraya Fakhri as Hassanein's wife
- Fouad El-Mohandes as Bassiouni
- Abdulaziz Ahmed as Hassanein
