= Al lailu lana =

1949 film

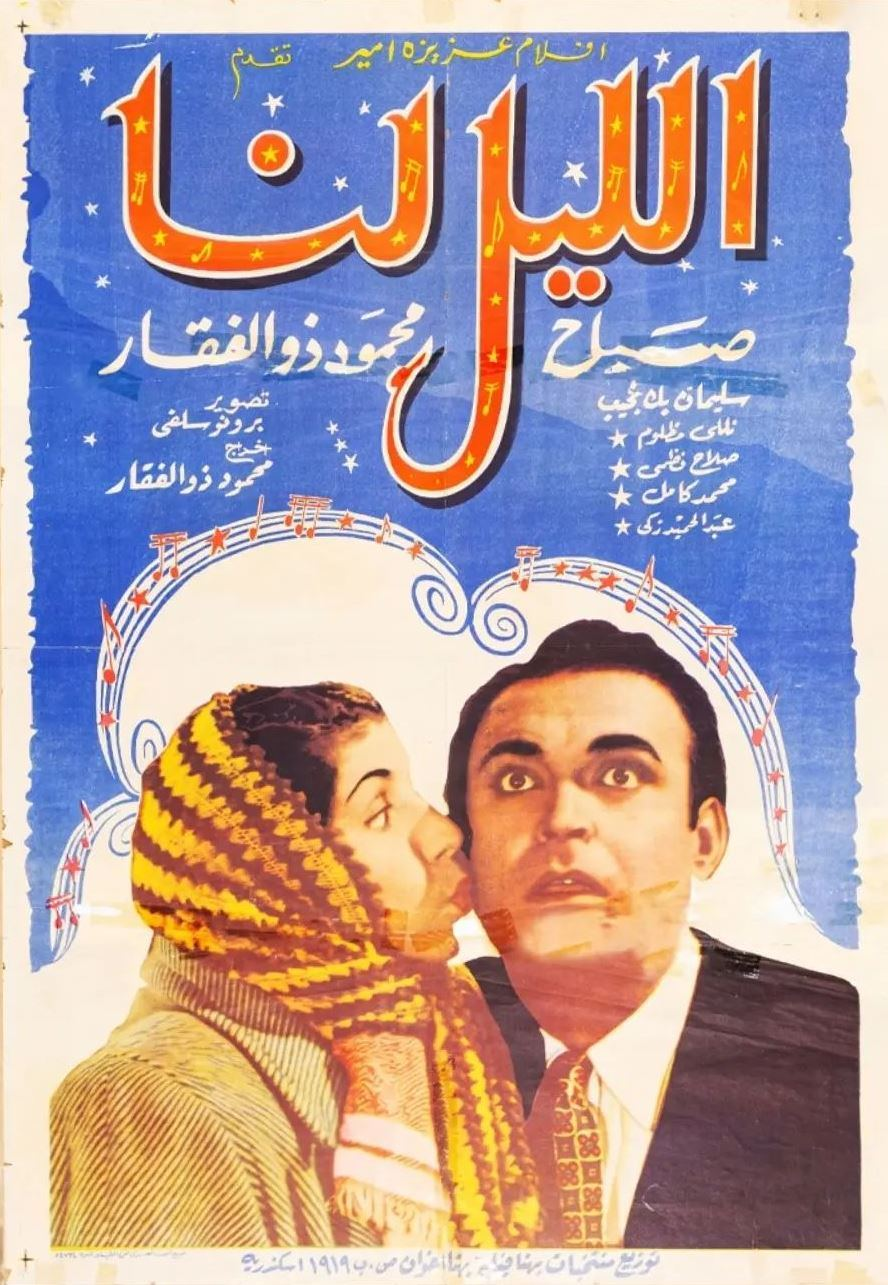
- Theatrical poster
- الليل لنا
- Directed by: Mahmoud Zulfikar
- Written by: Youssef Gohar
- Starring: Mahmoud Zulfikar; Sabah
- Cinematography: Bruno Salvi; Diaa Eddine Mahdi
- Edited by: Emil Bahary
- Music by: Riad Al Sunbati; Charl Vuscolo
- Production company: Aziza Amir Films
- Distributed by: Bahna Films
- Release date: 28 April 1949 (Egypt)
- Running time: 100 minutes
- Country: Egypt
- Language: Egyptian Arabic

Al lailu lana (Arabic: الليل لنا, translit.al-lail lana, English: The Night is Ours) is a 1949 Egyptian film directed by and starring Mahmoud Zulfikar and Sabah. The cast includes Suleiman Naguib and Nelly Mazloum.

== Plot ==
Nawal, a singer, and Maysa, a dancer, are two friends who work in a mobile band. The band manager Mohsen takes them to the city of El Mahalla El Kubra. Mohsen takes their revenue and runs away, so the owner of the hall expels them. Nawal and Maysa are thrown out of their hotel and they spend the night in the street, eventually finding an empty car to sleep in. When the owner of the car came, Dr. Wahid Kamel, who was on a home visit, and when he got into his car, he knew of their presence and they recognized him after he was misleading that they were teachers. Wahid saw Nawal again, and they are red to fall in love with each other and Wahid told his father, the Pasha that he wants to marry a school teacher, and he refused. Nawal came out of the theater at night in acting clothes and makeup, so the morals police suspected her and chased her, so she hid in the apartment of Abbas Hamed, the painter who drank a lot until he became drunk and told her that he would kill his uncle who was a guardian on him and stole all his inheritance, then he passed out. Nawal tried to take the keys from his pocket, but she couldn't, so she spent the night in the apartment, and in the morning she managed to take the keys and went out, while the police raided the apartment and arrested Abbas on charges of killing his uncle, who had been killed the night before and who had previously threatened to kill him in front of witnesses. Abbas managed to escape and searched for Nawal for she is the only witness to his innocence. Wahid offered to marry Nawal, but she evaded him and decided not to meet him again, because she lied to him about her job and understood that she was a teacher and did not tell him that she works as a singer in a hall. However, Maysa called Wahid and told him the truth, so he became more attached to her and married her despite the objection of his father, the Pasha, who then agreed. Abbas called Nawal and asked her to help him and testify that she had spent the night in his apartment and asked her to meet him in his apartment again to agree to surrender himself and her testimony in his favor, so she went to him behind her husband’s back, who watched her and doubted her behavior and thought she is in an affair with Abbas, and he divorced her instantly. Nawal was unable to meet Abbas because the police arrested him, and when Wahid learned of Abbas’ story, he agreed for Nawal to testify in his favour, despite the scandal that this caused him, and indeed Nawal went to court and acquitted Abbas and testified that she had spent that night with him, so the court acquitted him and the real killer was arrested, and Abbas swore to Wahid that his wife is honest and that she was a victim of misfortune. Finally, Wahid remarried Nawal and remained happily ever after.

== Crew ==
- Director: Mahmoud Zulfikar
- Writer: Youssef Gohar
- Studio: Aziza Amir Films
- Distributor: Bahna Films
- Music: Riad Al Sunbati and Charl Vusculo
- Cinematography: Bruno Salvi

== Cast ==
=== Primary cast ===
- Mahmoud Zulfikar as Dr. Wahid Kamel
- Sabah as Nawal
- Suleiman Naguib as the pasha, Wahid’s father
- Nelly Mazloum as Maysa
- Salah Nazmi as Abbas Hamed

=== Supporting cast ===
- Abdul Hamid Zaki
- Shafiq Nureddin
- Mahmoud Azmy
- Abdul Moneim Ismail
- Mohsen Hassanein
- Abdul Moneim Saudi
- Farag El-Nahhas
- Ali Kamel
- Mahmoud Nassir
