= My Only Love (film) =

- Hobbi al-Wahid poster
- Directed by: Kamal El Sheikh
- Written by: Ali El Zorkani; Sabri Izzat
- Starring: Omar Sharif; Nadia Lutfi; Kamal Al-Shennawi
- Distributed by: Jamal El Laithi
- Release date: 1960
- Running time: 120 minutes
- Country: Egypt
- Language: Arabic

My Only Love (Arabic: حبي الوحيد) is a 1960 Egyptian drama/romance film directed by the Egyptian film director Kamal El Sheikh. It starred Omar Sharif, Kamal Al-Shennawi, and Nadia Lutfi.

== Plot ==
Mona is in a love triangle with Adel (Omar Sharif), an airplane pilot who she loves, and Rushdi (Kamal Al-Shennawi), a family friend of Mona, who she has rejected on several occasions.

On the day of Adel and Mona's engagement party, Adel is bringing Mona's friend, Hoda, but there is a car accident on their way. When Mona telephones Adel to see why he is late, Hoda replies, consequently Mona thinks Adel is having an affair with her. She agrees to marry Rushdi, but after their marriage, he treats her badly. She conceives but after learning she has become pregnant, Adel hits her, thus making her miscarry.

Hoda meets Mona secretly and tells her the truth. Shocked by the truth, she asks Rushdi to divorce her. Rushdi plans to murder Mona, but he fails, and his plan is discovered. Mona spares Rushdi from any charges in return for their divorce. She is reunited with Adel.
