= Virtue for Sale =

1950 film directed by Mahmoud Zulfikar

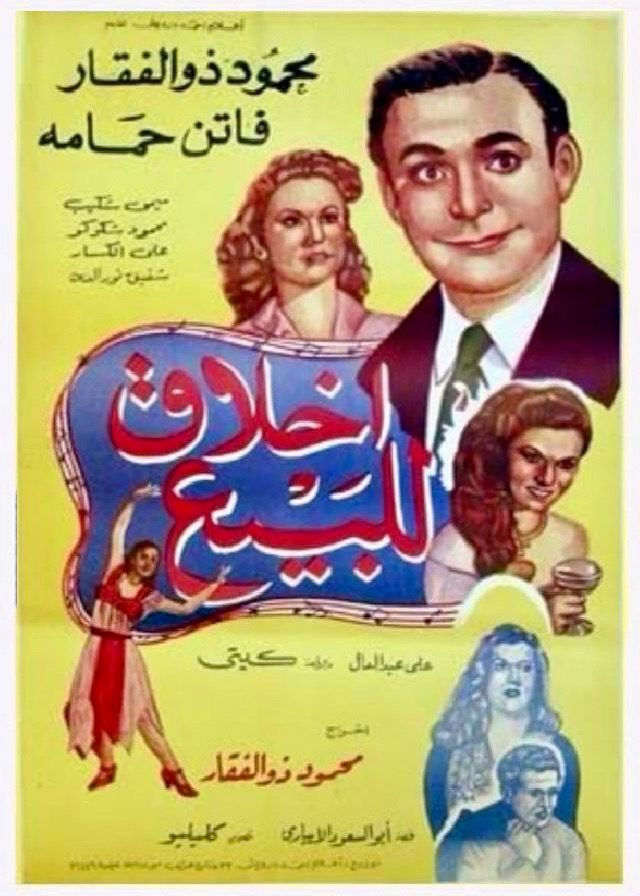
- Theatrical poster
- Arabic: أخلاق للبيع
- Directed by: Mahmoud Zulfikar
- Written by: Yusuf Sibai
- Screenplay by: Abo El Seoud El Ebiary
- Produced by: Mahmoud Zulfikar
- Starring: Mahmoud Zulfikar; Faten Hamama
- Cinematography: Celilio
- Edited by: Albert Naguib
- Music by: Ahmed Sedqi
- Production companies: Mahmoud Zulfikar films; Aziza Amir films
- Distributed by: Bahna films
- Release date: 20 December 1950 (Egypt)
- Running time: 105 minutes
- Country: Egypt
- Language: Egyptian Arabic

Virtue for Sale (Arabic: أخلاق للبيع, translit. Akhlaq li - l bay or Akhlaq lil bai, aliases: Ethics for Sale or Little Virtues) is a 1950 Egyptian comedy film directed by and starring Mahmoud Zulfikar and Faten Hamama. The film is based on Yusuf Sibai's story Land of Hypocrisy. Primary cast includes Mahmoud Shokoko and Mimi Chakib.

== Synopsis ==
In a fantasy, the film revolves around a husband who is suffering from his mother-in-law until he encounters a man who sells morality in powders. He buys the powder of courage to face his domineering mother-in-law and changes his life. He decides to go back to the seller and ask for new ones.

== Crew ==
- Directed by: Mahmoud Zulfikar
- Story: Yusuf Sibai
- Screenplay: Abo El Seoud El Ebiary
- Cinematography: Celilio
- Editing: Albert Naguib
- Producer: Mahmoud Zulfikar
- Production studio: Mahmoud Zulfikar films – Aziza Amir films
- Distribution: Bahna films

== Cast ==
- Mahmoud Zulfikar: (Ahmad)
- Faten Hamama: (Amina)
- Mimi Chakib: (Amina's mother)
- Mahmoud Shokoko: (Bulbul)
- Ali al-Kassar: (the seller of morals)
- Shafiq Noureddine: (Cohen the owner of the pension)
- Kitty: (Dancer Katina)
- Ali Abdel-Aal: (Katina's father)
- Abdel Hamid Zaki: (Director)
- Zaki Ibrahim: (Amina's uncle)
- Aliya Fawzy: (Maid Amina and Ahmed)
- Toson Metemed: (Hospital nurse)
- Mohammed Sobeih: (the thief)
- Abdel Moneim Bassiouni: (employee)
- Mohsen Hassanein: (the drunk customer)
