= A Girl from Palestine =

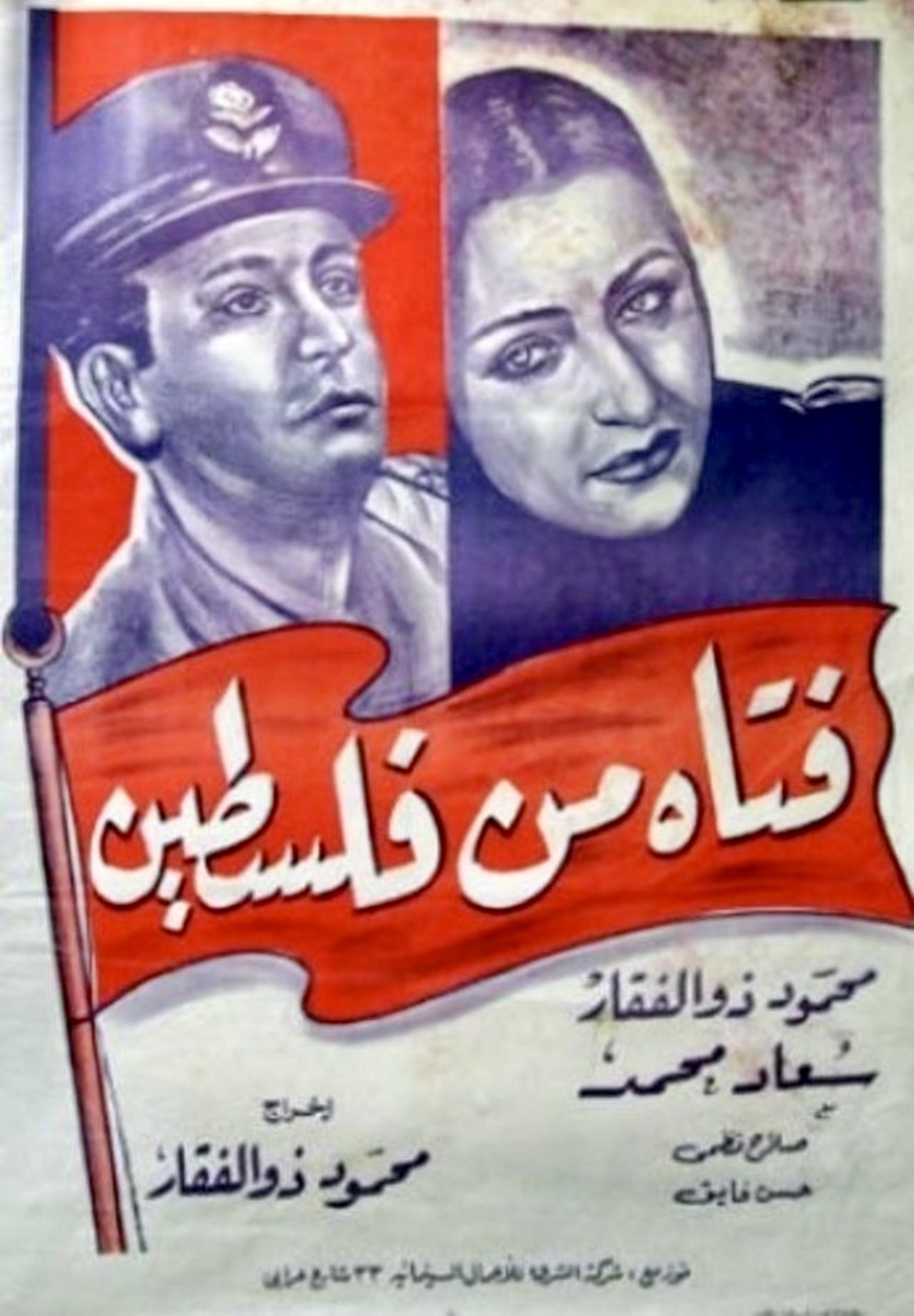
- Film poster
- Directed by: Mahmoud Zulfikar
- Written by: Youssef Gohar
- Screenplay by: Aziza Amir
- Produced by: Aziza Amir
- Starring: Mahmoud Zulfikar; Soad Mohammed
- Cinematography: Wahid Farid
- Edited by: Galal Mostafa
- Music by: Riad Al Sunbati; Mohamed El Qasabgi
- Production company: Aziza Amir Films
- Distributed by: Al Sharq Films
- Release date: 1 November 1948
- Running time: 88 minutes
- Country: Egypt
- Language: Egyptian Arabic

A Girl from Palestine (Arabic: فتاة من فلسطين translit: Fatah Min Falastin) is a 1948 Egyptian film directed by and starring Mahmoud Zulfikar.

== Plot ==
During 1948 Arab–Israeli War, an Egyptian fighter pilot stubbornly defends the Palestinian land against the Israeli enemy. In the same air raid, his plane crashes in a Palestinian village, and Salma the Palestinian finds him injured in his foot. She hosts him in her home and works to heal his wounds, which brings the Egyptian and Palestinian hearts closer. Then the film exposes the stories of the Palestinian guerrillas who prefer death to the Zionist occupation, and then we know that Salma's house is nothing but a center for the guerrillas' weapons. The Egyptian pilot admires the girl Salma and her courage until they exchange love and marry in a Palestinian wedding that the guerrillas seduce in the Palestinian popular manner, and the Egyptian pilot returns to complete his mission in defending Palestine.

== Main cast ==
- Mahmoud Zulfikar
- Souad Muhammed
- Hassan Fayek
- Zainab Sedky
- Salah Nazmi
- Said Khalil
- Wafaa Adel
- Qadriya Mahmoud

== See also ==
- Egyptian cinema
- List of Egyptian films of the 1940s
