= Aziza Amir =

Egyptian actress, producer, and screenwriter

- عزيزة أمير
- Born: Mofeeda Mahmoud Ghoneim مفيدة محمود غنيمي; 19 December 1901; Damietta, Egypt
- Died: 28 February 1952 (aged 50); Cairo, Egypt
- Occupations: Actress, screenwriter, producer
- Spouse: Mahmoud Zulfikar (m. 1939)
- Children: Amira Amir

Aziza Amir (Arabic: عزيزة أمير; 17 December 1901 – 28 February 1952) was an Egyptian actress, producer, and screenwriter. She is well-regarded in Egyptian film, often referred to as "the godmother of Egyptian cinema."

== Early life ==
Aziza Amir was born Mofida Mohamed Ghoneim in Alexandria on 17 December 1901, to a family originally from Damietta. Her father died while Mofida was still an infant, after which point the family relocated to Cairo. Following the revolution of 1919, Egyptian women sought more active roles in public life. Nevertheless, a stigma against actresses persisted, and Mofida adopted the stage name Aziza Amir in order to avoid negatively impacting her family's reputation. It was under this name that she began her career in theater.

== Career ==
In 1925, Amir joined the "Ramsis" acting troupe. That same year, her starring role in Al-Jah al-Muzayyaf (The Fake Status) launched her to success in the theater world. Shortly after, Amir starred in a stage production of Napoleonette, through which she met her first husband Ahmed El Sheirei, the then-mayor of Samalout.

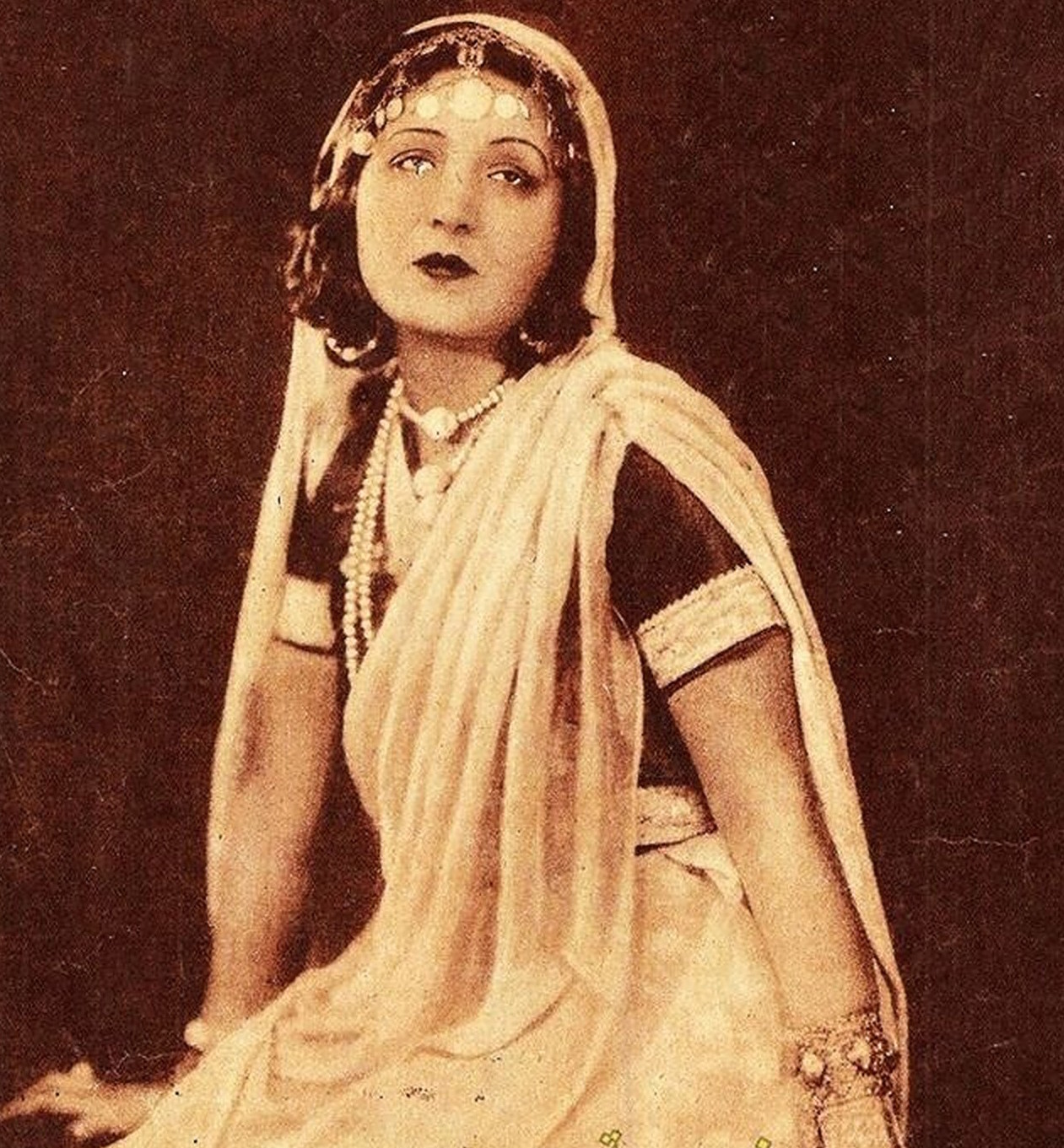
Aziza Amir in Laila (1927)

Laila (1927), commonly considered the first Egyptian film ever made, marked Aziza's debut into film stardom. The film was released on 16 November 1927, following a strung of conflicts with director Wadad Orfi and German producers. Orfi was eventually replaced as director by Stephane Rosti, though some of Orfi's originally shots remained in the film's final cut. Both the media and Amir husband's family at the time of Laila's release opposed her participation in the film; Laila went on to be a success. In 1933, she wrote, directed, and starred in Pay for your Sins (1933). (Note: The film's title has several English translations; Atone for your Sins and Pay for your Misdemeanor are the most common.) It was around this time that Amir and her first husband would divorce.

Egypt's film industry began to thrive in the 1940s; Amir began to write more screenplays as a result. She would eventually have seventeen writing credits to her name. Amir had an adopted daughter Amira who acted alongside her in the film My Daughter (1944). She would star and produce a total of twenty five films in her lifetime. Amir also starred in the silent film Fattah min Istanbul (1928) and played the role of Brezka in the film Ahl El Kahf.

Amir continued to participate in the film industry in various roles, starring in, directing, and producing films throughout the rest of her life. Amir owned and operated her own production company, Isis Films, which would prove hugely influential to the creation and development of Egyptian cinema. Amir married Egyptian actor and director Mahmoud Zulfikar, who directed nearly two dozen films in which Amir starred. The couple co-produced A Girl from Palestine (1948), a romantic wartime drama highlighting the struggles of Palestinians amidst the ongoing war.

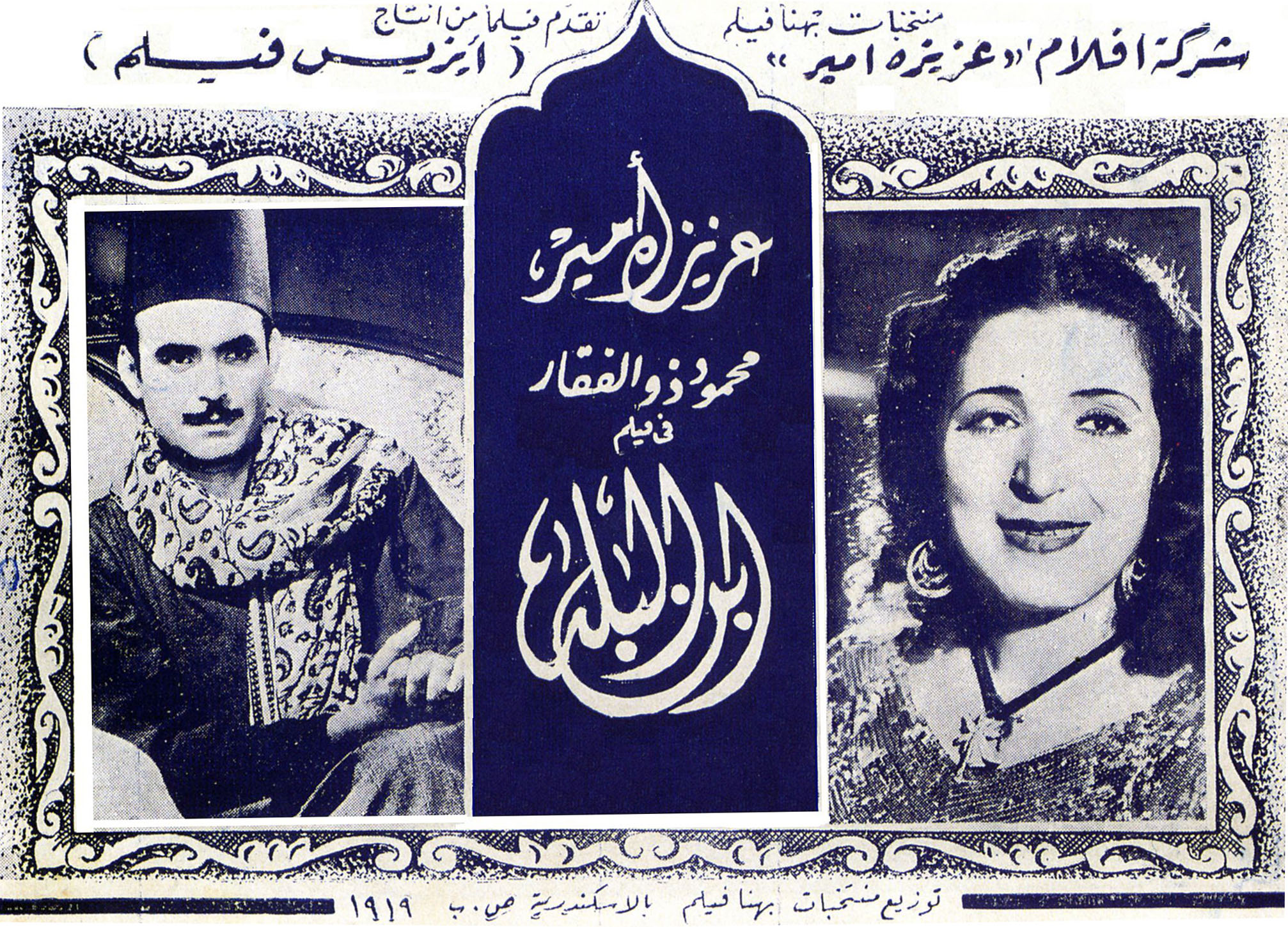
Amir and Mahmoud Zulfikar on the poster for Ibn El-balad (1942)

Amir remained active as a leading actress and producer for the remainder of her life. She died at the age of fifty of an unnamed terminal illness.

== Legacy ==
Laila (1927) was released during a period of nationalism in a newly-independent Egypt, further driving nation-wide interest in Egyptian film. The film, which was screened in the royal palace to King Fouad, further galvanized this appeal As Saad Zaghloul became prime minister and the new constitution issued that all men and women are equal in the way they serve their country, this added to the overall sense of belonging and national pride to many women. Amir's role in the movie Laila was more than just a silent role but attempted to mend the old culture with the more contemporary one, showing the character in more rural areas while also connecting the character to more pharaonic roots by showing her in the deserts of Saqarra. As the country struggled with its own identity and westernization and discourses of conservatism juxtaposed against liberalism, Aziza Amir's performance in her film Laila is still of note and mentioned as the first Egyptian feature-length film ever made. Egyptian mogul Talaat Harb was quoted stating that Amir had "achieved what men had not been able to achieve," while writer Taha Hussein declared that Amir "possesses the golden voice."

Aziza Amir emerged as a significant figure in Egyptian culture during a period where the newly-independent nation struggled to build its identity, while Egyptian women specifically struggled over matters of autonomy, tradition, and the demands of both public and domestic life. Egyptians chose to concentrate on women's power and status within the home and on breeding nationalist potency largely within the domestic sphere. In appealing to the more family-centered traditions of Arab kinship structures, Egyptian feminism marked itself out as separate and not imported from other foreign women’s liberation movements. Amir's prominence in the film industry displayed remarkable independence and autonomy at a pivotal era. Amir discussed her experiences in the industry with rhetoric that focused on maternity and framed the Egyptian nation in equally independent and familial terms, notably stating "I have one daughter and that is Egyptian Cinema".

== Selected filmography ==
=== As actress ===
- Laila (1927)
- Daughter of the Nile (1929)
- Istanbul sokaklarinda (1931)
- Pay for Your Sins (1933)
- His Highness Wishes to Marry (1936)
- The Apple Seller (1940)
- El warsha (1941)
- Wedding Night (1942)
- Ibn El-balad (1942)
- Valley of Stars (1943)
- The Magic Hat (1944)
- My Daughter (1945)
- Money (1945)
- The Return of the Magic Hat (1946)
- The Unknown Singer (1946)
- All is Well with the World (1946)
- A Candle Is Burning (1946)
- Hadaya (1947)
- Above the Clouds (1948)
- Everyone is Singing (1948)
- Nadia (1949)
- Fate and Fortune (1951)

=== As writer ===
- Pay for Your Sins (1933)
- The Workshop (1940)
- El warsha (1941)
- Ibn El-Balad (1942)
- The Magic Hat (1944)
- My Daughter (1944)
- Hadaya (1947)
- Above the Clouds (1948)
- A Girl from Palestine (1948)
- My Father Deceived Me (1951)

=== As producer ===
- Laila (1927)
- Pay for your Sins (1933)
- My Daughter (1945)
- Hadaya (1947)
- Everyone Is Singing (1948)
- A Girl from Palestine (1948)
- The Night is Ours (1949)
- Above the Clouds (1948)
- Virtue for Sale (1950)
- My Father Deceived Me (1951)

=== As director ===
- Laila (1927)
- Daughter of the Nile (1927)
- Pay for Your Sins (1933)
