= Yana Yana =

"Yana Yana يانا يانا"

Single by Sabah and Rola
- Released: 2009
- Recorded: 2009
- Genre: Arab Pop
- Composer: Baligh Hamdi
- Lyricist: Morsy Jamil Aziz

Music video
- "Yana Yana" on YouTube

"Yana Yana" (in Arabic يانا يانا) is a famous Arabic language song in Egyptian Arabic by the Lebanese pan-Arab singer Sabah.

Lyrics are written by Morsy Jamil Aziz and music is by Baligh Hamdi. The song was first featured in the 1970 Egyptian film Kanit Ayam [Those were the Days] before it was released as a single in an album entitled 'Ashqa wa Ghalbana [Poor Woman in Love]. The song enjoys huge popularity in the Arab World.

There was a remake of the song as a duet between Sabah and newcomer Rola Saad.
