= Nelly Mazloum =

Egyptian dancer and actress (1929–2003)

Nelly Mazloum نيللي مظلوم
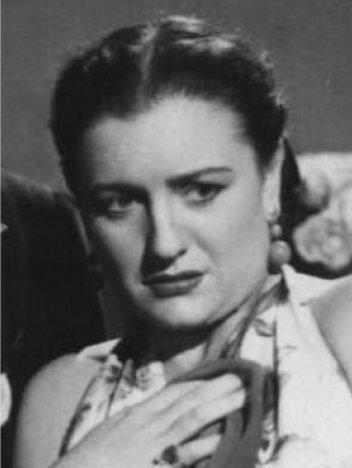
- Born: Nelly-Catherine Mazloum-Calvo; 9 June 1929; Alexandria, Egypt
- Died: February 21, 2003 (aged 73); Athens, Greece
- Occupations: Dancer, Choreographer, Dance teacher, Oriental dance legend

Nelly Mazloum (Arabic: نيللي مظلوم; 9 June 1929 – 21 February 2003), an Egyptian of Italian and Greek origin, was an actress, choreographer, dancer, and teacher of ballet, modern dance, Egyptian folkloric dance, traditional oriental dance and the creator of the oriental dance technique.

She was a pioneer, in that she was the first to apply Egypt's traditional legacy of Folkloric Dances into a dramatised artistic form. Known for her sense of humour, she was known in Egypt in the 1930s as a child prodigy and from the 1940s to the 1960s for her many appearances in Egyptian films, her folkloric shows on Egyptian TV, and her company the "Nelly Mazloum Arabic Troupe of Dancer".

== The early years ==
Nelly Mazloum-Calvo was born in Alexandria, Egypt to wealthy Italian-Greek parents. Her father, who created jewellery, was an Italian from Naples and her mother, who was an able pianist, was Greek, from Asia Minor. They owned a hotel across the street from the Alhambra theatre. Mazloum suffered from paralysis of the legs (poliomyelitis) at the age of two, and walked again after years of care by a paediatrician and his wife who was a ballet dance teacher. For this reason, dance became her passion.

At the age of five, she started a dance career as a solo dancer and was called by the media the prodigy child. In fact she was a child star from 1939–1945, she performed daily watched by her mother, who was her manager, working in Alexandria in the summer and in Cairo during the winter. The 10-year-old Mazloum appeared in her first film, I prosfygopoula ("The refugee girl", 1939), which was made in the Greek language and starred Sophia Vembo with a screenplay by D. Bogris. As a child she danced at the famous Casino Opera, run by Badia Masabni, where great Raqa Sharki dancers started their careers; there were two shows every day, a matinee for the whole family and an evening performance during which alcohol could be reserved. While Nelly was engaged as a child in the matinee shows and danced modern dance and classical ballet, once her own dancing was over, she stayed on to watch the evening show of belly dancers like Samia Gamal and Tahiya Karioka. On many occasions she appeared in front of King Farouk, in the same show as Samia Gamal and Umm Kulthum. In 1948 Nelly Mazloum became the prima Ballerina of the Royal Opera House in Cairo (Dar Al Opera) from 1959 to 1964 she was the choreographer of Al Masrah al Kaoumy (National Theatre), Koumeya troupe. For many years she gave innumerable Folkloric performance in local theatres and in various television shows in Egypt.

== The golden years ==
In the 1940s and 1950s She danced and acted in Egyptian theatres, creating her own choreographies; she also performed/acted in about 17 films. Of those, she performed oriental dance only in a few. One is Shahrazad (1941) starring Hussein Sedky, Elham Hussein and Samia Gamal, the other one was Soliman's Ring (1946), directed by Hassan Ramzy (the uncle of percussionist Hossam Ramzy).

Her daughter Marianna said during a lecture on Mazloum's life and career in CID, UNESCO (International Dance Council) "My mother's performance was in demand, as she had the privilege of being the only modern dancer in Egypt at that time."

Starting in 1947 she established a successful ballet school in Cairo for the girls of the elite society; she also taught and trained young artists for the National Opera House in Cairo (Dar Al Opera.)

Mazloum liked the luxuries in life, and she enjoyed life to the full. She was married six times. She met her first husband A. Roussos in 1949, and this union produced a son, Emanuel and two years later a daughter, Marianna.

During the early fifties, whenever the opportunity and time permitted, Mazloum travelled the whole country, observing and studying people's dances in their original surroundings, from desert Bedouins to the Ghawazi (Gagar), in the villages, souks and cities, always looking for new dance movements. Marianna also mentioned during her lecture, "My mother met and talked with remarkable human beings: teachers, musicians, writers, poets and archaeologists, who knew a lot about the culture and tradition of Egypt she was also an avid reader and researcher who studied books in the National Egyptian Museum, looking for descriptions of dances and costumes from ancient times; the director gave her special permission, provided she handled the fragile manuscripts with white gloves on. When attending private family parties of the elite, she would observe their dancing, which had a more refined style than the balady (Native) or the shaabi (Popular) – she called that refined style: 'hawanem'"

== The Nelly Mazloum troupe ==
Eventually, Mazloum divorced her husband, she reopened in 1951 her ballet school and in 1955 returned to performing and formed her own dance company; she established her folkloric dance school in Cairo for the training of the members of her company; she was the most famous folkloric dancer in Egypt who inspired a whole generation of dancers and choreographers at that time. She was the pioneer who attempted for the first time to apply Egypt's traditional legacy of Folkloric Dances into a dramatized artistic form. The members of her company were all amateurs, some taken from her ballet school, some from the field of gymnastics, some were students and some had jobs.[2] Her troupe started with 25 people but soon grew to 40 dancers (20 female and 20 male) with a big orchestra. Her own theatrical company, inaugurate the Nelly Mazloum style, which was called by the media and the public 'Raqs el Ta'Biry' (Folk Dance) and was her own artistic elaboration and stylisation of the raw material of folk dances she had observed and studied. The programme included many scenes from rural life. She was the director, choreographer, performer and teacher of her own company. Marianna said in her lecture: "The Company presented only the folkloric style of dance Raqs Shaabi, belly dancing at that time was not considered worthy of the theatre, it was only danced on the stage of Badia Masabni during the 40s, then during the 50s many solo dancers or small dance companies were mostly hired for parties, weddings, films and nightclubs.." In 1958, Mazloum's dance company was showcased in the great Cotton Fair Festival, at the Grand Palais in Gezira. Mazloum was the first to present folkloric dances on stage and her dance company was the first Egyptian dance troupe to record Egyptian folk songs and dances from many different and remote regions of Egypt and perform them on stage and on television programs.

In 1959-60, the Egyptian government founded the Egyptian National Ballet Academy under the direction of Alexei Jukov, who was assistant teacher of the Bolshoi Ballet School in Moscow and was provided by the then Soviet Union to the Egyptian government. Mazloum was appointed by the Ministry of Culture to be his assistant for the protection of the Egyptian content of Classical dance. A year later the National Ballet Academy was founded and for three years she was Jukov's right hand. In 1961 another ambitious project was formed: the establishment of a National Folkloric Academy under the direction of another Russian, Boris Ramazin who was the first assistant and dancer of the "Moiseyev Dance Company" in Russia. Again Mazloum was his bridge to the local talent. He came to her in the morning, to learn the traditional movements of folkloric dances which he then taught to the students in the afternoon. However, when she saw that the Russians adulterated the Egyptian style and made it more Russian, she stopped her collaboration, and quit the job. But her experience with them was invaluable, helping her to organize her knowledge of technique and create a method for her own school — what would emerge as the "Nelly Mazloum Oriental Dance Technique."

It was a time of great political favour. The Minister of Culture, Dr. Tharwat Okasha, was so enthusiastic about her work that he used to buy tickets for the Egyptian people, so that everyone could see her shows. In 1961, he gave her Masrah al Ayem (floating theatre), which toured Egypt stopping to perform at every village.[6] Mazloum also did experimental styles like pharaonic dance (she presented it at the first 'Sound and light' show [6]), a "desert dance" with veil,[9] etc. One of her great successes was the biblical story Ayub el Masri, in 1961-1962.[10] It was also the year she and her company participated in the Helsinki International Youth Festival, where she was awarded the Silver Medal for her folkloric dances: Al Ghazl (the weaving of the bridal veil), for the first time in the history of Egypt's a dancer represented Egypt. She became the official choreographer of the Cairo Opera, for opera and operetta productions. She choreographed, among others, Mahr el Aroussa (The bride's dowry) in 1963, the first all-Arabic classical operetta.[11] The president Gamal Abd al Nasser was in the opening of the operetta. During the lecture Marianna showed us documents and photos of this event and many other.

After having formed the Ballet Academy and the Folkloric Dance Academy, the government approached her about forming a National Folklore troupe (without her). She replied "the troupe without me does not exist" and refused, remaining independent. As they told her that once the company is nationalized they will give her a pension and she will not be able to work with her company as they will belong to the government.

== The move to Greece ==
With a change of government in 1964, the tide turned, and the Minister of Culture which had supported Mazloum was now out of favour. The support for Mazloum and her company fell way, and many dancers found their employment with the National Troupe of dancers that was the representative of the Egyptian folkloric dance. The new regime made life for Mazloum very difficult, starting a slander campaign in the press. Determined as always Mazloum never gave up, she packed all her belonging and left Egypt for Greece to start afresh. There, she buried all the tokens of her past career in a series of trunks and concentrated on teaching and propagating the art of dance, founding the Athens International Dance School, where she taught ballet, and modern dance; Mazloum changed her name to Nelly M. Calvo, so that people wouldn't associate her with her past self, she succeeded in her endeavour, and formed many teachers and dancers in Greece.

== Teaching dance and the MADRI foundation ==
From 1985 to her death in 2003, she restarted teaching Oriental Dance, using her own system and creative technique: the Nelly Mazloum Oriental Dance Technique, which includes her own signature style, called "Hawanem", the dance of high nobility. Mazloum also developed her own system of working out called 'Vivicorporeal Psychosomatic Alignment Technique' in support of Oriental Dance; she also started giving a series of seminars throughout Europe, where she was the first to introduce Oriental Dance Technique, Vivicorporeal and Pharaonic Dances. Mazloum favoured the term Oriental Dance which has a positive implication instead of 'belly dance' which carries a negative charge.

Mazloum's main focus for teaching her method of Oriental Dance emphasizes postural awareness, along with the detailed and accurate execution of steps, musical interpretation, and expressive performance. Her structured pedagogical approach has influenced dancers and instructors internationally. She is known for a methodical teaching style that combines technical precision with attention to musicality and expression. Participants in her seminars have noted improvements in posture, technique, and overall dance quality following her instruction.

In 1990 she started writing her book "Nelly Mazloum Oriental Dance Technique" a study of Egyptian dance method for the women of the New Age (published in 1992)). In 2001 she founded the Nelly Mazloum Mediterranean Archaic Dance Research Institute (MADRI - co-founded by her daughter Marianna), a non-profit dance organization that stood for the evolution and preservation of ancient Mediterranean Dances as well as the preservation of her techniques.

Mazloum wrote in one of her articles "Archaic dance still influence our moving center, for they are rooted in the cosmic memory of our planet. They may disappear into past but always find their way back to us through research work and spiritual identification." She also wrote: "I am opposed to false representations and fantasies about oriental dance as well as unwarranted assumption and tampering with teaching this dance, because it stifles progress. A well designed and systematically structured technique has the advantage that you are trained with a firm foundation. Then it's time to dream to your heart's content and follow the path of creativity and self-discovery." According to Mazloum learning steps and technique is not sufficient for a good dancer. She wanted her students to examine their potential and above all, they should love their work, "Students and teachers must love what they do, with their whole heart, their whole mind and their whole body."

Nelly Mazloum died on February 21, 2003, in Athens. Her daughter Marianna Rousou (also known by her stage name Marhaba) was her foremost student who received continuous first hand instruction from her mother since childhood and always assisted her during the workshops, as well as taught for more than 40 years, offers seminars and lectures – backed by accurate documents and rare photos - on Nelly Mazloum's life, dance method, legacy and work.

== Selected filmography ==
- 1949 Al lailu lana

== See also ==
- Women in dance
