= Three Women (1968 film) =

- Arabic: ٣ نساء
- Directed by: Mahmoud Zulfikar; Salah Abu Seif; Henry Barakat
- Written by: Ihsan Abdel Quddous
- Produced by: Ramses Naguib
- Starring: Sabah; Huda Sultan; Mervat Amin; Salah Zulfikar; Ahmed Ramzy; Shoukry Sarhan
- Cinematography: Waheed Farid (first story); Ali Hassan (second story); Ibrahim Shamat (third story)
- Music by: Fouad El Zahery
- Production company: Ramses Naguib
- Distributed by: General Egyptian Corporation for Cinema and Television
- Release date: 1968
- Running time: 120 minutes
- Country: Egypt
- Language: Egyptian Arabic

Three Women (Arabic: ٣ نساء, translit: Thalath Nisa) is an Egyptian film released in 1968. It tells three separate stories about three women, featuring Sabah, Huda Sultan and Mervat Amin as the three women. The film is written by Ihsan Abdel Quddous and stars Salah Zulfikar, Ahmed Ramzy and Shoukry Sarhan.

== The first story: Hana ==
=== Plot ===
Hana (Mervat Amin), an air hostess, loves Adel (Salah Zulfikar), the architect, but she meets Sami (Samir Shamas), the Lebanese pilot, and she also falls in love with him. The choice is settled.

=== Cast ===
- Salah Zulfikar: (Adel)
- Mervat Amin: (Hana)
- Samir Chamas: (Sami)
- Abdel Moneim Ibrahim: (Abdul Hamid Zuhdi)
- Ragaa El Geddawy: (Hana's colleague)
- Nadia Seif Al-Nasr: (Hana's colleague)
- Alia Abdel Moneim: (Hana's mother)
- Atef Makram: (Adel is Hana's brother)

=== Staff ===
- Directed by: Mahmoud Zulfikar
- Screenplay and dialogue: Mohamed Abu Yousef
- Director of Photography: Waheed Farid

== The second story: Tawheeda ==
=== Plot ===
Tawheeda, a beautiful widow (Huda Sultan), loves Youssef (Shukri Sarhan), an employee of the Probate Council, and she turns to him to finish her pension procedures. But he does not care about her because he is married and has children. She resorts to one of the charlatans in order to make a puzzle in order to relate to her and love her. But they were swindlers who drain her money and get arrested. Youssef goes to her and thinks that he is coming to marry her, but he tells her that he is asking her for a loan to treat his sick wife, so her hopes collapse and are shattered after everything she did for him.

=== Cast ===
- Huda Sultan: (Tawhida)
- Shoukry Sarhan: (Youssef)
- Muhammad Reda: (The teacher is serious)
- Tawfiq Al-Daqn: (The Wizard)
- Malak El Gamal: (Prophecy - mother of Tawheeda)
- Aliyah Abdel Moneim: (Youssef's wife)
- El Deif Ahmed: (assistant of the charlatan)
- Samir Ghanem: (One of the charlatans)
- George Sidhom: (one of the charlatans)

=== staff ===
- Directed by: Salah Abu Seif
- Screenplay and dialogue: Mohamed Mostafa Sami
- Director of Photography: Ali Hassan

==== song ====
- Oh, six ships, oh buoy (Al-Zar)
- Performed by: Huda Sultan
- Written by Hussein El-Sayed
- composed by Sayed Mekawy

== The third story: Shams ==
=== Plot ===
A singer in Lebanon's cabarets falls in love with Fathi and has a relationship with her, but he lives in confusion because of her sitting with customers and feels jealous, so he goes to her in the cabaret to sit with him like any customer, despite warning him that she loves him for his person and not for his money. But she treats him as a customer and leaves him and leaves as usual with the customers of the shop and decides to stay away from him because he did not understand and did not appreciate her love.

=== Cast ===
- Sabah: (Shams)
- Ahmed Ramzy: (Fathi)

=== staff ===
- Directed by: Henry Barakat
- Screenplay and dialogue: Mohamed Abu Yousef
- Director of Photography: Ibrahim Shamat

==== song ====
- My love, who threw me
- Performed by: Sabah
- Written and composed by the Rahbani Brothers

== Film staff ==
- Written by: Ihsan Abdel Quddous
- Produced by: Ramses Naguib
- Distributed by: The Egyptian General Organization for Cinema
- Editing: Hussein Afifi
- Soundtrack: Fouad El Zahery
