= El Hub Keda =

1961 film

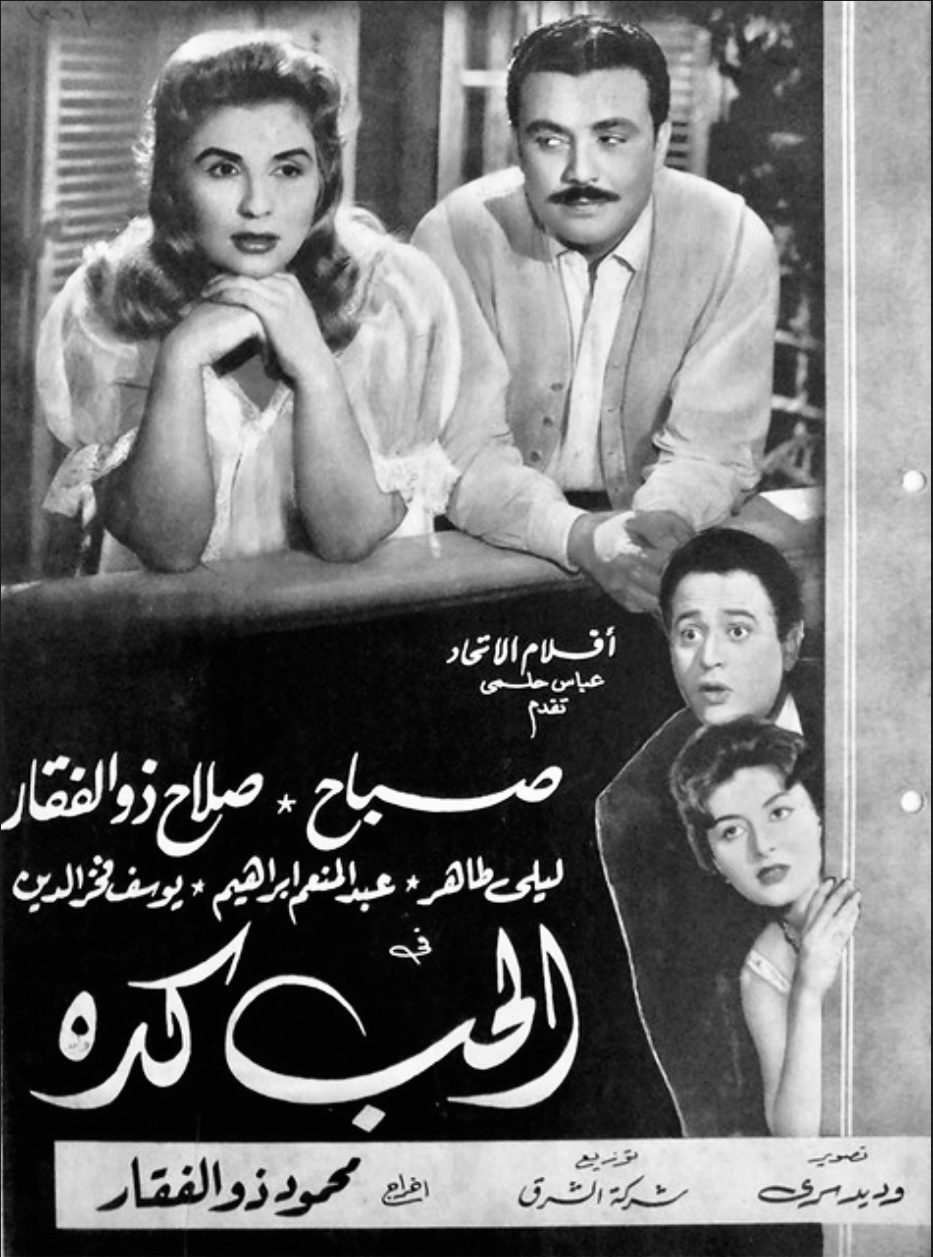
- Theatrical release poster
- Egyptian Arabic: الحب كده
- Directed by: Mahmoud Zulfikar
- Screenplay by: Mohamed Abu Youssef
- Story by: Badi' Khayri
- Produced by: Abbas Helmi
- Starring: Salah Zulfikar; Sabah
- Cinematography: Wadid Serry
- Edited by: Fekry Rostom
- Music by: Andre Ryder
- Production company: Union Films (Abbas Helmi)
- Distributed by: Al Sharq Film Distribution Company
- Release date: 12 October 1961 (Egypt)
- Running time: 105 minutes
- Country: Egypt
- Language: Egyptian Arabic

El Hub Keda (Arabic: الحب كده, translit.Al Hubb Kida or Al-Houbb kidah aliases: That’s What Love Is or This is Love French: C'est ça l'amour) is a 1961 Egyptian romance film written by Badi' Khayri and directed by Mahmoud Zulfikar. It stars Salah Zulfikar and Sabah. The film was produced by Abbas Helmi for Union Films and was released on October 12, 1961, by El Sharq Distribution.

== Plot ==
Hamdi is a mechanical engineer owning a car repair shop, and he loves his cousin Nadia without her even realizing it. Nadia is a newly divorced, wealthy young woman; she loves the attractive young Hazem, who is chasing her, aiming to marry her for her wealth. They secretly meet, and she claims to her family that she is meeting her cousin Hamdi instead. From time to time, she passes by Hamdi. At the same time, his friend Ezzat loves Hazem's Salwa.

Nadia goes to Hazem's house to visit his mother, and Hamdi watches her and confronts her. Hazem tries to rape her, and Hamdi saves her. Nadia's parents approve the marriage proposal of Ihsan, a wealthy man whom she cannot stand, and she also does not want to fail in any upcoming marriage. She agrees with Hamdi to make their marriage to escape from Ihsan's marriage proposal. Afterwards, they go through situations that push them to get closer, and at the end, the fictitious marriage turns into a real one.

== Crew ==
- Writer: Badi' Khayri
- Screenwriter: Mohamed Abu Youssef
- Director: Mahmoud Zulfikar
- Produced by: Union Films (Abbas Helmi)
- Distribution: Al Sharq Film Distribution Company
- Soundtrack: Andre Ryder
- Cinematographer: Wadid Serry
- Editor: Fekry Rostom

== Cast ==
- Salah Zulfikar as Hamdi
- Sabah as Nadia
- Laila Taher as Salwa
- Abdul Moneim Ibrahim as Ezzat Gadallah
- Youssef Fakhr Eddine as Hazem
- Mimi Chakib as Nadia's mother
- Adly Kasseb as Ramadan, Nadia's father
- Mohamed El-Deeb as Ehsan
- Bob Azzam as Singer
- Mimi Gamal as Hazem's girlfriend
- Hussein Ismail as Sheikh Ali
- Azhar Sharif
- Fatima El-Gamal
- Ekram
- Yasmine
- Mukhtar Sayed
- Awatef Yousry
- Gamil Ezz El Din
- Essam Abdo

== Songs ==
- Vocal: Sabah
  - “Muhtar Ya Qalbi”, written by Fathi Qora, composed by Farid al-Atrash
  - "Ew'a", written by Muhammad Halawa, composed by Muhammad Al-Mougui
- Vocal: Bob Azzam
  - ”Ya Mustafa”, written by: Saeed El Masry, Composed by Mohamed Fawzi

== See also ==
- Salah Zulfikar filmography
- List of Egyptian films of 1961
