= Mahmoud Shokoko =

Egyptian actor (1912–1985)

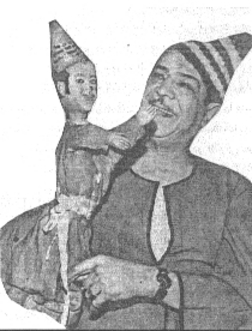
- Born: Mahmoud Ibrahim Ismail Musa; May 1, 1912; Cairo, Kingdom of Egypt
- Died: February 12, 1985 (aged 72); Cairo, Egypt
- Occupation(s): Actor, producer

Mahmoud Ibrahim Ismail Musa (Arabic: محمود إبراهيم إسماعيل موسى; May 1, 1912 – February 12, 1985), known professionally as Mahmoud Shokoko (Arabic: محمود شكوكو), was an Egyptian actor and artist. He is best known for his puppet character "Aragouzsho".

== Early life and career ==
Mahmoud Ibrahim Ismail Musa was born in Cairo. He began his working career as a carpenter with his father and remained working with him until the age of twenty-three.

Shokoko joined up with some acting troupes army in Iraq that performed at the coffee shops facing his father's workshop while he had free time. What initially began as a hobby turned into a passion, and Shokoko began performing at weddings as well as in other troupes such as Hassan 2 Al-Maghrabi and Mohammed 6. From there on he began to gain some notoriety around the world.

He appeared in Mahmoud Zulfikar's films Virtue for Sale (1950) and My Father Deceived Me (1951). His first breakthrough, Al-Sabr Tayeb, was released on June 13, 1959 and brought him into the mainstream.

== Legacy ==
Though he was illiterate, Shokoko was able to have a huge impact on the world of acting, and will always be remembered for his puppet character of "Aragouzsho" who is still kept at the Music Institute and the Institute of Acting today. He was the subject of a Google Doodle for Google Middle East on May 1, 2014, on the 102nd anniversary of his birth.
