= Sabah (singer) =

Lebanese singer and actress (1927–2014)

Sabah صباح
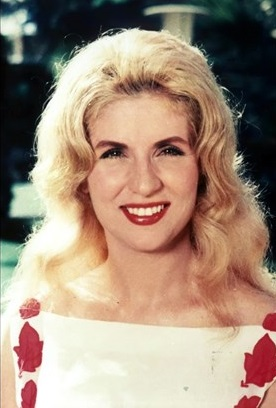
- Sabah in 1963

Background information
- Born: Jeanette Georges Feghali; 10 November 1927; Wadi Chahrour, Mount Lebanon, Greater Lebanon
- Origin: Bdadoun, Mount Lebanon, Lebanon
- Died: 26 November 2014 (aged 87) Beirut, Lebanon
- Genres: Mawwal; shaabi; pop
- Occupations: Singer; actress
- Instrument: Vocals
- Years active: c. 1945–2009
- Labels: Parlophone; Voix de l'Orient; Rotana; The Orchard; Global
- Publisher: Digital Press Hellas
- Spouses: Najib Chammas; Rushdy Abaza; Anwar Mansy; Ahmed Farraj; Joe Hammoud; Wassim Tabbara; Fadi Lubnan

Jeanette Georges Feghali (Note: Arabic: جانيت جرجس فغالي, pronounced [ʒaˈneːt fɪˈɣeːli].) (10 November 1927 – 26 November 2014), known professionally as Sabah, (Note: Arabic: صباح, romanized: Ṣabāḥ, pronounced [sˤɑˈbɑːħ], lit. 'Morning'.) was a Lebanese singer and actress. Her professional career started in Egypt and later extended to Lebanon and the wider Arab world. She amassed a vast line of work over six decades, out-scaling most past and present contemporaries. Sabah is often regarded as one of the greatest Arab singers of the 20th century.

Born to rural Lebanese parents in a village 15 kilometres from Beirut, Sabah grew up with a love for performing arts. In 1945, she was noticed for an acting talent at her school in Lebanon and later invited to Egypt by actress and film director Assia Dagher. There, she was cast in her first film as the original character Sabah, whose name was chosen through a public poll and later adopted by Sabah as a stage name.

Most of Sabah's career spanned the mid-1940s to the early 2000s. In 1958, she acted in her first film with Abdel Halim Hafez, which helped her enter the mainstream Arab acting scene. She is said to have produced about 3,000 to 5,000 songs, acted in nearly 100 films, and nearly 20 stage plays.

Sabah remains a celebrated figure in Arabic music. Even though she was scrutinised for her bold outfits, use of cosmetic surgery, and outspoken personality, she has become praised as a major artistic figure within the Arab socialist movement.

Over the years of her professional life, she had come to be known by several other nicknames, the most notable of which being Al-Shahroura (Note: Arabic: الشحرورة, romanized: Ash-Shaḥrūra, pronounced [ɪʃʃaħˈruːra], lit. 'the Songbird'.) (alternatively Shahrourat al-Wadi), (Note: Arabic: شحرورة الوادي, romanized: Shaḥrūrat al-Wādī, pronounced [ʃaħˈruːrɪt lˈweːdi], lit. 'Songbird of the Valley [of Shahrour]', in reference to her birthplace, Wadi Chahrour.) Shams al-Shomous, (Note: Arabic: شمس الشموس, romanized: Šams aš-Šumūs, lit. 'the Sun of Suns'.) Al-Sabbouha, (Note: Arabic: الصبوحة, romanized: aṣ-Ṣabbūḥa, a diminutive of Sabah.) and Al-Ustura, (Note: Arabic: الأسطورة, romanized: al-Usṭūra, lit. 'the Legend'.) as well as "The Notorious Diva" (in the 2009 duet of Yana Yana with Rola Saad).

== Early life ==
Sabah was born to a Maronite family in Wadi Chahrour, Baabda District, as the youngest of three daughters. During her childhood, she was harassed by her father who had hoped for a son. Her brother eventually killed their mother, suspecting her of having an affair. Sabah was the sister of famous Lebanese actress Lamia Feghali and a maternal first cousin of famous Lebanese singer and actress Alexandra Nicholas Badran, known as Nour Al Hoda. She grew up in the nearby town of Bdadoun, Aley District.

== Career ==
Sabah emerged in a period when the field of Arab singers included many notable talents, such as Umm Kulthum (1904–1975), Nagat El Saghira (born 1938), Warda Al-Jazairia (1939–2012), Shadia (1931–2017), Fairuz (born 1934 or 1935), among others.

Sabah began singing at a young age and released her first song in Lebanon in 1940 at the age of 13. In the early 1940s, she was invited to Egypt by actress and producer Assia Dagher. Sabah acted alongside Dagher in her first movie, El-Qalb Luh Wahid (The Heart Has Its Reasons), released in 1945, which brought her regional fame. She then became widely known by her character's name, Sabah, which means "morning" in Arabic.

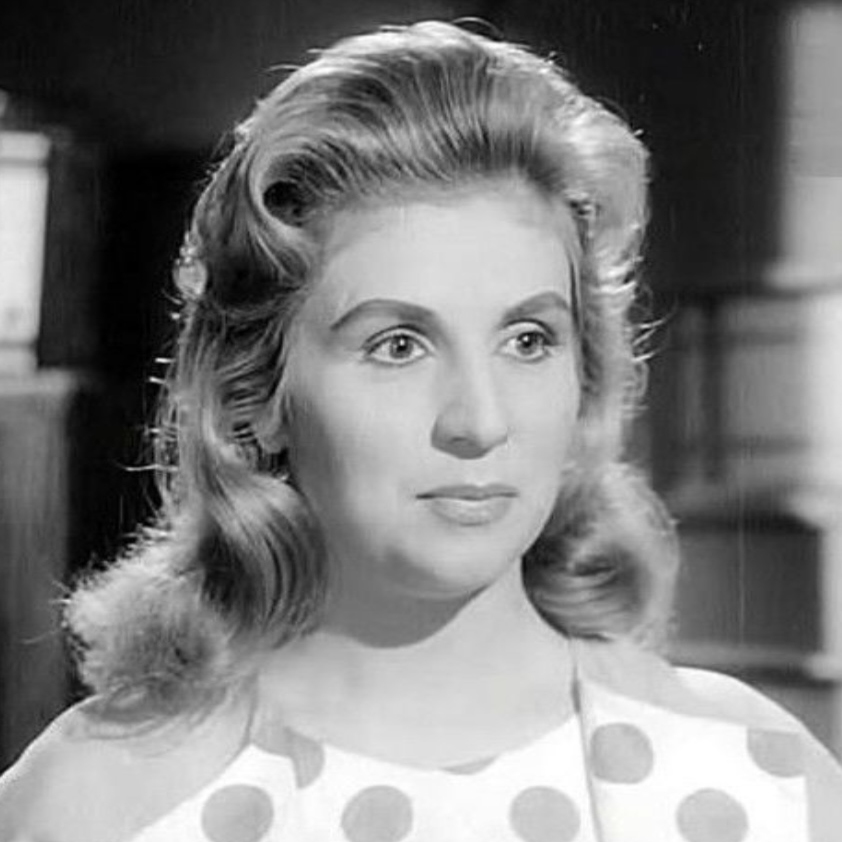
Sabah in El Hub Keda (1961)

Sabah was active in Egyptian cinema and resided in Egypt for two decades. Among her most popular films were Al lailu lana (1949), My Father Deceived Me (1951), El Hub Keda (1961), Soft Hands (1963), Three Women (1968), Paris and Love (1972), and The Second Man (1959), where she played a cabaret singer seeking to avenge her brother's death at the hands of a smuggling ring. In the 1990s, Sabah and her former husband, Fadi Lubnan (Kuntar), produced a documentary about her life. Titled The Journey of My Life (مشوار حياتي, Mishwār Ḥayātī), the documentary aired on Future Television.

Throughout her music career, Sabah recorded over 3,000 songs, collaborating with numerous renowned Egyptian composers, including the late Mohammed Abdel Wahab. She specialized in the Lebanese folk tradition known as mawwāl, and among her most famous songs were "Zay el-Assal" ("Your Love is Like Honey on my Heart") and "Akhadou el-Reeh" ("They Took the Wind"). Sabah released more than 50 albums and appeared in 98 films. Known for her youthful spirit and vibrant performances, she became a symbolic figure of the "belle époque" and the "joie de vivre" in the Levant and the Arab world. Despite the Lebanese civil war, she continued to sing at weddings in Lebanon.

Until 2009, Sabah performed in concerts and on television, including appearances on programs like Star Academy. She collaborated closely with singer Rola Saad in remaking some of her previous hits, such as "Yana Yana". The accompanying video, which pays tribute to Sabah as "the notorious diva", received significant airplay on Arabic music channels. Additionally, Sabah hosted the TV show Akher Man Yalam on 31 May 2010.

During the 2011 Beiteddine Art Festival, a performance was staged that retraced Sabah's journey as a singer and movie star. Rouwaida Attieh played the title role, alongside more than 40 singers and dancers, paying tribute to Sabah's contributions.

In 2010, Sabah retired from public life for health reasons, which resulted in paralysis affecting one of her arms and legs.

== Personal life ==
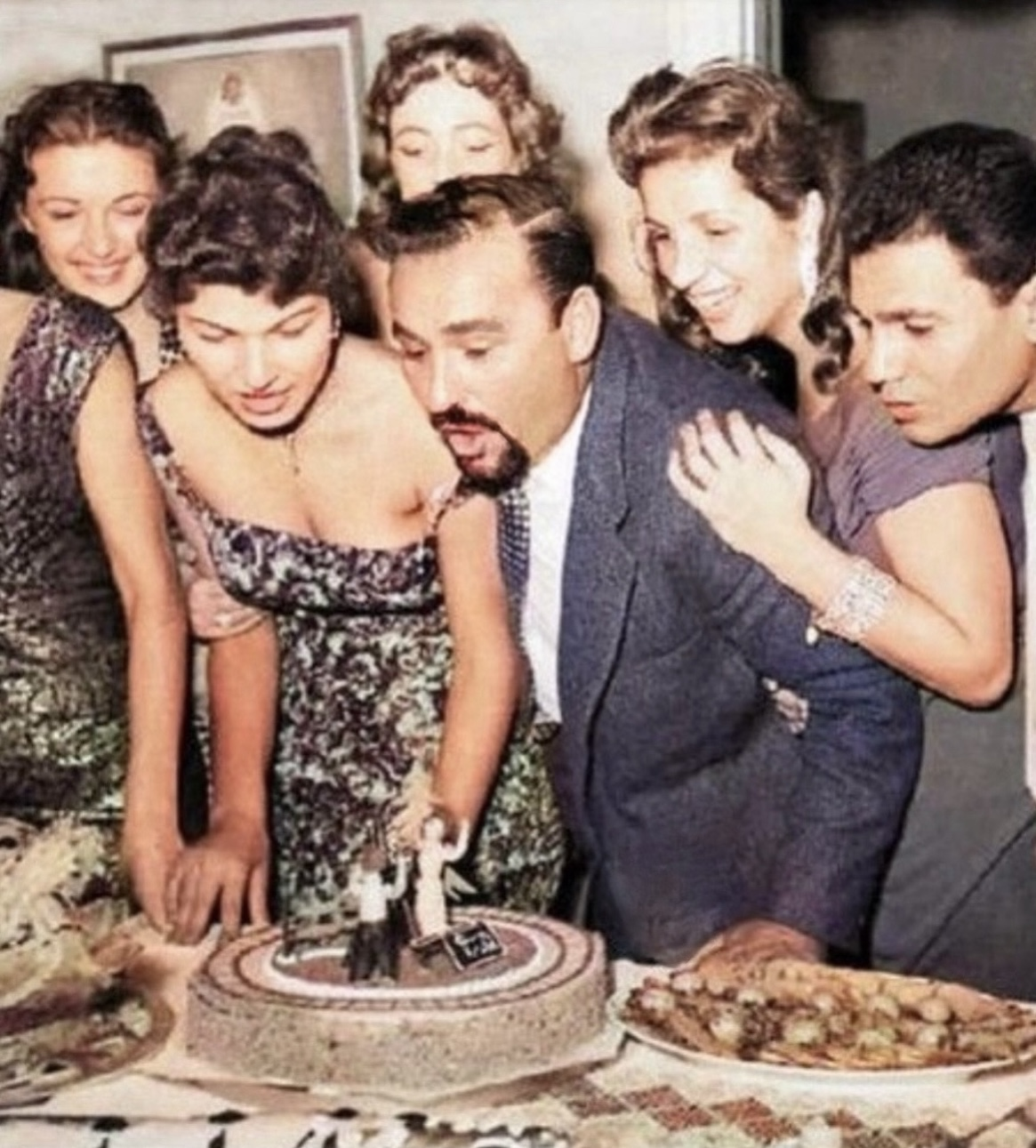
Sabah (second from right) with Abdel Halim Hafez, Huda Sultan, Kawthar Shafik and Mariam Fakhr Eddine celebrating Ezz El-Dine Zulficar's birthday, 1959

Sabah held passports from Lebanon, Egypt, Jordan, and the United States.

She married Lebanese businessman Najib Chammas at the age of 18 and later married nine more times. Her notable spouses include Egyptian actor Rushdy Abaza, Egyptian musician Anwar Mansy, Egyptian television presenter Ahmed Farraj, Lebanese politician Youssef "Joe" Hammoud, and Lebanese author-director Wassim Tabbara. Hammoud reportedly divorced Sabah in the 1970s following a scandal related to a performance in which she wore revealing shorts. Her last marriage, which lasted 17 years, was to the much-younger Lebanese artist Fadi Lubnan. She had two children: Sabah Chammas, from her marriage to Najib Chammas, and Howayda Mansy, from her marriage to Anwar Mansy. Sabah Chammas is a medical doctor, while Howayda Mansy is known as a singer, actress, and socialite. Both of Sabah's children reside in the United States. Sabah was also the paternal aunt of Brazilian congresswoman Jandira Feghali and her brother Ricardo Feghali, a member of the band Roupa Nova, through her brother Albert.

After selling her house in Hazmieh, which she felt as "too big and cold for only one person", Sabah relocated to the nearby Hotel Comfort in Baabda, Mount Lebanon, a hillside city with views of Beirut and the Mediterranean Sea. Later, she resided in another hotel adjacent to Baabda.

Sabah with her great-nephew Karim Shayya on 12 August 2011, during Karim's birthday celebration

During this period, she lived with members of her extended family, including her niece's daughter, Jeanette Aoun; Jeanette's husband, Hussam Shayya; and their son, Karim Shayya, who was only six years old when Sabah died. Sabah shared a particularly close and affectionate relationship with Karim from his early childhood and was known within the family for her strong affection for him. Despite his young age, she often expressed her belief that Karim would grow up to become a prominent public figure, imagining that he might one day become a major media personality, public figure, or even a member of parliament. She frequently encouraged and supported him and remained particularly fond of him during the years they lived together in Baabda. Karim Shayya is now known for his involvement with Sar El Wa2et, the current-affairs program broadcast on MTV Lebanon, where he is involved in the program's digital media and youth-oriented activities.

== Death ==
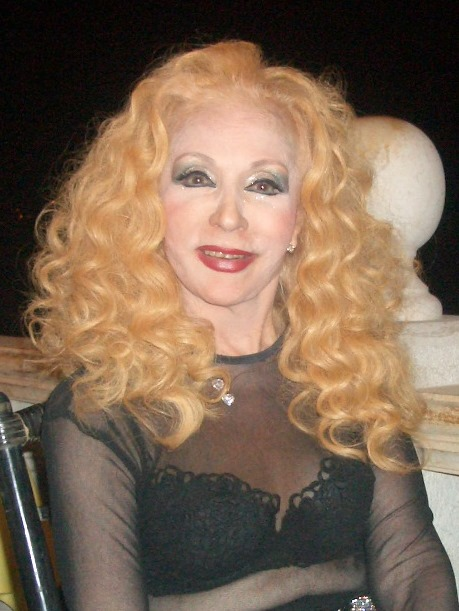
Sabah at a restaurant in Beirut, c. 2007

Rumors of Sabah's death circulated days before she died. Amused by the rumors, Sabah said, "Even in my death, I'm making people busy." She died on 26 November 2014, at approximately 3:00 a.m., sixteen days after celebrating her 87th birthday, at her residence in Hotel Brazilia, due to unspecified reasons. The news was first published by Clauda Akl, daughter of her sister Lamia Feghaly. It was mentioned that Sabah expressed a wish for people not to mourn her and to dance the dabke at her funeral, stating "I've lived enough." Following her death, her hairdresser and husband Joseph Gharib shared in an interview that Sabah had a fondness for wearing red lipstick during her final days.

Sabah's funeral was held four days after her death at St. George Cathedral in downtown Beirut. Her family, Lebanese officials, and numerous Arab delegates attended the ceremony. Outside the cathedral, the official Lebanese Army band performed the national anthem, followed by several songs from Sabah's extensive repertoire. Additionally, a group of dancers dressed in traditional attire performed to her music, which played through loudspeakers.

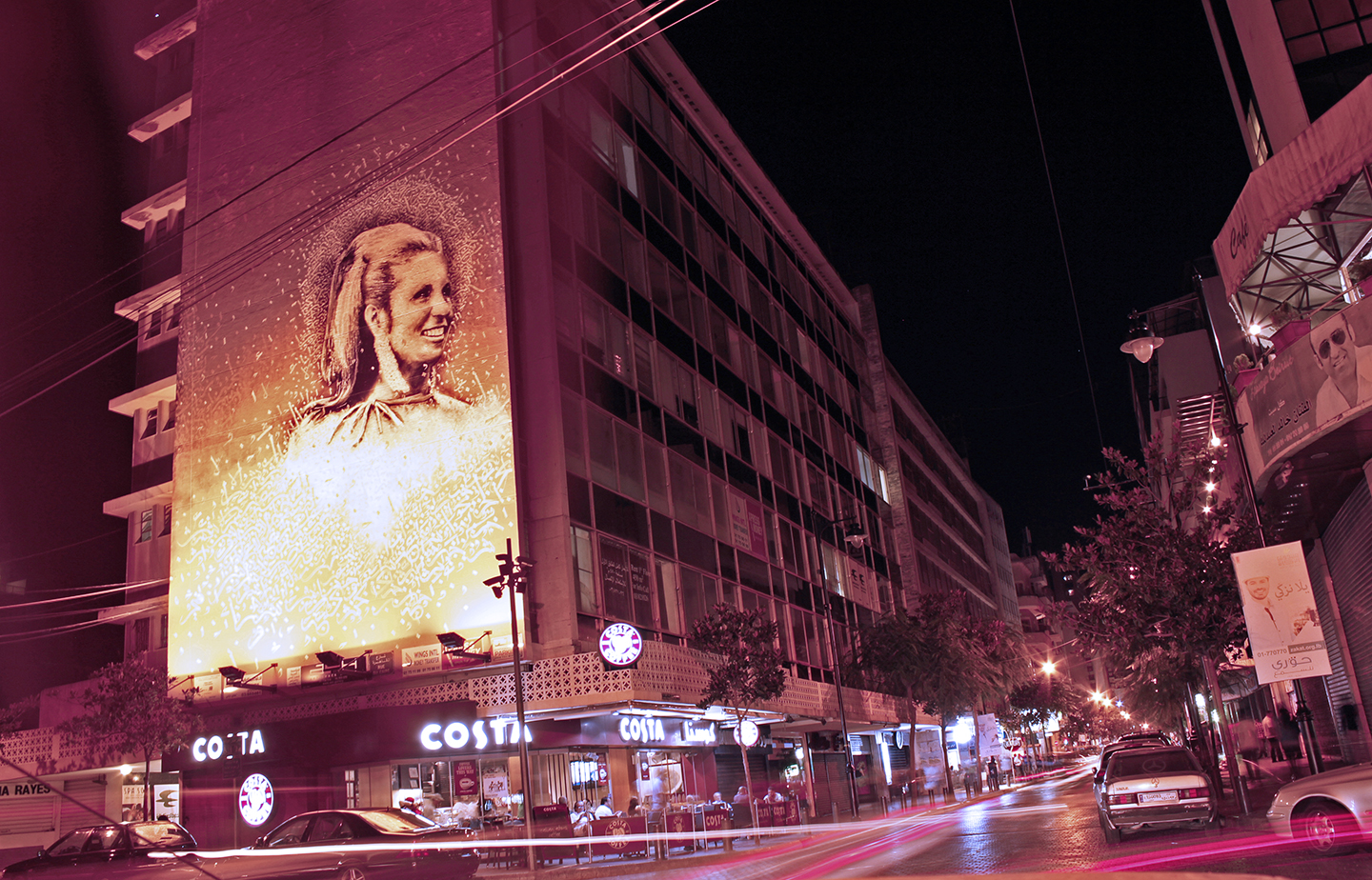
Sabah mural on the Assaf building in Hamra Street, Beirut

During the funeral mass, Sabah's coffin, draped in a flag, was placed near the altar alongside a large photograph of the singer during her younger years. Following the service, mourners escorted the casket to a waiting hearse outside. People expressed their respects by applauding, throwing flowers, and reaching out to touch the coffin and take photographs. Sabah's body was transported through several towns to the church in her hometown of Bdadoun, where she was laid to rest.

== Legacy ==
The TV drama Al Shahrourah, based on Sabah's life, aired during Ramadan in 2011, with actress and singer Carole Samaha portraying her. Sabah generally responded positively to the series, though she noted some inaccuracies, such as the portrayal of her father in traditional Lebanese attire. Months before her death, Lebanese journalist Rima Njeim hosted a live TV episode on MTV Lebanon honoring Sabah.

Her music is included in music classes in Lebanon. In 2015, graffiti artists Halwani and the brothers Omar and Mohammad Kabbani created monumental murals on buildings in Beirut to commemorate Sabah. These artworks celebrated her for challenging gender-based and other social taboos, and for offering an alternative to the dominant images of political leaders and their slogans in Lebanese culture.

On 10 November 2017, Google honored what would have been her 90th birthday with a Google Doodle. In Marvel's Moon Knight TV series, her song "Saat Saat" from the 1980 Egyptian movie A Night When The Moon Cried is featured at the end of episode 5.

On 27 January 2023, the Lebanese television program "The Stage", broadcast on LBCI, aired a special episode honoring Sabah and her legacy. The episode featured several guests who spoke about her life, career, and lasting influence, including family members Clauda Akl and Karim Shayya, as well as Lebanese artists and public figures Joseph Azar, Jihad Ayoub, and Alain Zoughbi. The guests shared personal recollections and paid tribute to Sabah's enduring place in Lebanese and Arab popular culture.

On 6 September 2023, the Alexandria Film Festival announced the results of a poll it conducted to compile a list of the top 100 Egyptian musical films. Approximately 32 film critics and cinematographers participated in this poll. Sabah appeared in six of the selected films, including "Love Street" (1959), "The Unmarried Mother" (1950), "Bolbol Afandi" (1946), "Soft Hands" (1964), "Leila Baka Feha Al Qamar" (1980), and "He Stole My Wife" (1954).

== Awards ==
In 2004, Sabah was recognized at the Alexandria Song Festival and the Cairo Film Festival. Additionally, she was honored with a statue in Beirut during the same year.

In 2010, she received a Lifetime Achievement Award from the Dubai International Film Festival.

She received multiple honors from the Lebanese Republic, including the National Order of the Cedar medal.

== Work ==
Sabah released more than 50 albums and appeared in 98 films, along with over 20 stage plays. She was known for having a vast repertoire of over 3,500 songs.

=== Selected filmography ===
- 1986 Ayyam El Lulu ايام اللولو aka = Days Of The Pearls
- 1972 Paris wal Hob باريس والحب aka = Paris and Love
- 1970 Kanet Ayyam كانت ايام aka = It Were Days
- 1970 Nar El Shoq نار الشوق aka = Fire Of Longing
- 1969 Easabet El Nesa عصابة النساء aka = Gang Of Women
- 1968 Thalath Nesaa ثلاث نساء aka = Three Women
- 1966 Mawwal El Aqdam El Zahabiyyah موال الاقدام الذهبية aka = Popular Song Of Golden Feet
- 1963 El Aydi el naema الايدى الناعمة aka = The Soft Hands
- 1963 El Motamaradah المطاردة aka = The Chase
- 1961 El Hub Keda الحب كده aka = That's What Love Is
- 1961 Goz merti جوز مراتى aka = Husband Of My Wife
- 1960 El Ragol El Thani الرجل الثانى aka = The Second Man
- 1959 El Ataba El Khadra العتبه الخضرا aka = The Green Threshold
- 1958 Shari' El Hobb شارع الحب aka = Love Street
- 1958 Sallem Al Habayib سلم ع الحبايب aka = Say Hello To Lovers
- 1956 Izayy Ansak ازاى انساك aka = How To Forget You
- 1956 Wahabtak Hayati وهبتك حياتى aka = I Gave You My Life
- 1954 Khataf merati خطف مراتى aka = He Kidnapped My Wife
- 1953 Lahn Hobbi لحن حبى aka = Melody Of My Heart
- 1953 Zalamuni El Habayib ظلمونى الحبايب aka = Were Unjust To Me, The Lovers
- 1951 Khada'ni Abi خدعنى ابى aka = My Father Deceived Me
- 1950 Ana Satuta انا ستوته aka = I'm Sattutah
- 1949 Al lailu lana الليل لنا aka = The Night is Ours
- 1948 Sabah El kher صباح الخير aka = Good Morning
- 1947 Albi W Sefi قلبى و سيفى aka = My Heart And My Sword
- 1947 lebnani Fi El gam'ah لبنانى فى الجامعة aka = Lebanese In University

=== Selected discography ===
Release year	Original title	Translation	Label	Main songwriter(s)/producer(s)	Notable songs
1957	Alhan Bilady	Favourite Oriental Melodies	Voix de l'Orient	Folk	Ya Huwaidalak; Abu Al-zuluf
1957	Ghanni Maa Sabah	Sing with Sabah	Voix de l'Orient	Folk	Tayyib Tayyib
1959	Ajmal Aghani Sabah	Sabah Sings Love Songs	Voix de l'Orient	Philémon Wehbé	Al-iza'a; Al 'Asfuriyya
1960	Mawsam El 'Ezz (with Fairuz & Wadih El Safi)	Baalbeck International Festival	Voix de l'Orient	Assi & Mansour Rahbani; Wadih El Safi; Philémon Wehbé	
1960	Ain Al Roumane - Musical (with Fairuz & Wadih El Safi)	The Village	Voix de l'Orient	Assi & Mansour Rahbani	Finjan Qahwa; Al Tayir
1963	Share' Al Hob - Soundtrack From Ezzel Dine Zulficar's Motion Picture (with Abdel Halim Hafez)	Street of Love	Orient	Hussein Al Sayed; Munir Mourad	Rahat Leialee Wa Jat Leialee
1964	Ash-Shallal - Musical	The Cascade	Voix de l'Orient	Walid Gholmieh; Younes El Ebn	Ya Mrouj
1964	Fatinat Ajjamahir	Girl for the Masses	Voix de l'Orient	Assi & Mansour Rahbani; Mohamed Abdel Wahab; Zaki Nassif; Philémon Wehbé	Sana Helwa
1966	Dawaleeb Al Hawa - Musical	The Pinwheels	Voix de l'Orient	Assi & Mansour Rahbani; Philémon Wehbé	Esmy Hala
1966	Shams El Shoumous - Musical	Sun of Suns	Voix de l'Orient	Assi & Mansour Rahbani; Philémon Wehbé	Allo Beirut
1967	Sabah		Philips	Philémon Wehbé; Elias Rahbani; Michel Tohme	Al Bassata
1968	Al Al'aa	Baalbeck Festival	Philips	Romeo Lahoud	Ya Ahl Al Al'aa
1969	Sabah		Philips	Mohamed Abdel Wahab; Philémon Wehbé; Michel Tohme; Halim El Roumi	Jary Ya Jary; Ya Msafer
1970	Al Wahm - Musical	Illusion	Philips	Najib Hankash; Maurice Awad	Nehnal Hawa
1972	Ahlan Wa Sahlan Wa Marhaba	Hello and Welcome	Voix de l'Orient	Walid Gholmieh; Younes El Ebn	Al Bassata
1974	Sett El Kol - Musical	The First Lady	Voice of Lebanon	Philémon Wehbé; Michel Tohme	Ya Dalaa Dallaa
1974	Helwe Ktir - Musical	So Beautiful	Voice of Lebanon	Nicolas El Deek; Michel Tohme	Marhaba Ya Habayeb; Bawsa
1974	Oghniyat min Lubnan	Songs of Lebanon	Cairophon		Rabie Loubnana
1976	Sabah in Paris (live)		Voice of Lebanon	Toufic Barakat; Nour Al Mallah	Dek El Kaf
1977	Shahr El 'Asal - Musical	Honeymoon	Voice of Lebanon	Melhem Barakat; Elie Choueiri	Men Aboukra; Hala Hala
1977	Sabah		Voice of Lebanon	Melhem Barakat; Farid El Atrache; Romeo Lahoud	Helwet Lebnan; Zay El Amar
1977	Allah Makom Ya Chabab	God Be with You Guys	Duniaphon	Melhem Barakat; Farid El Atrache; Romeo Lahoud	Allah Makom Ya Chabab; Zein El Abidin
1977	Wetdallou Bikheir - Musical (with Wadih El Safi)	May You Be in Good Health	Duniaphon	Zaki Nassif	Ward El Janaen
1979	Live Performances (live)		Voix de l'Orient	Michel Tohme; Philémon Wehbé	Marhabtein W Marhabtein
1980	Ghnany 'Al Bal (with Wadih El Safi)	Souvenirs	Voix de l'Orient	Wadih El Safi; Philémon Wehbé	Altaf Diney; Aatouni Derbake
1980	Leyla Beky Feeha Al Amar - Soundtrack From Ahmed Yehya's Motion Picture	The Night the Moon Cried	Sout El Hob	Mohamed Abdel Wahab; Omar Batiesha	Yalla Naish El Hayat
1982	Wadi Shamsine	Sings Elias Rahbani	Rahbania	Elias Rahbani	Waadouni W Natarouni; Rakesni Hayk
1985	Sabah in Hollywood (live)		Sphinx	Ma'moun El Shinnawi; Samy Farag	Ahlan Wa Sahlan
1985	Ayam El Loulou	Days of Loulou	Relax-In	Elie Choueiri	Ayam El Loulou
1988	Yalla Naish El Hayat	Let's Live This Life	Relax-In	Jamal Salama	Yalla Naish El Hayat
1993	Khatwa Khatwa	Step by Step	Relax-In		Khatwa Khatwa; Shoufo Shoufo
1996	La Tiaanidni	Don't Hate Me	Disco 99		La Tiaanidni
