= Kamal el-Shennawi =

Egyptian actor

- Born: Mohamed Kamal Al-Shennawi; December 26, 1921; Malakal, Kingdom of Egypt (Present day South Sudan)
- Died: August 22, 2011 (aged 89); Cairo, Egypt
- Occupations: Actor, director, producer
- Years active: 1947-2006

Mohammed Kamal el-Shennawi (Arabic: محمد كمال الشناوي, Moḥammad Kamāl ish-Shennāwī; December 26, 1921 – August 22, 2011) was an Egyptian film and television actor, director and producer.

== Filmography ==
| Year | International title | Original title | Role | Notes |
|---|---|---|---|---|
| 1948 | Immortality | Kholoud, خلود | | |
| 1948 | The Punishment | Al-Iqab, العقاب | | |
| 1948 | The Dove of Peace | Hamamat al-Salam, حمامة السلام | | |
| 1949 | The Princess's Secret | Sir al-Amirah, سر الأميرة | | |
| 1949 | Street of the Acrobat | Share` al-Bahlawan, شارع البهلوان | | |
| 1949 | Towards Glory | Nahwa al-Majd, نحو المجد | | |
| 1949 | Shadow of a Woman | Khayal Maraa', خيال مرأة | | |
| 1949 | Halawa | Halawa, حلاوة | | |
| 1949 | The Princess of the Island | Amirat al-Jazirah, أميرة الجزيرة | | |
| 1950 | Calumnied by the People | Zalamoni al-Nas, ظلموني الناس | | |
| 1950 | The Beaty Lady | Sitt al-Hosn, ست الحسن | | |
| 1950 | An Hour for Your Heart | Sa'a Le Qalbak, ساعة لقلبك | | |
| 1950 | Husband of Four | Jawz al-Arba'a, جوز الأربعة | | |
| 1950 | Father Amine | Baba Amine, بابا أمين | | |
| 1951 | The Much-Loved One | Habibi Kateer, حبيبي كتير | | |
| 1951 | The Count of Monte Cristo | Ameer al-Intiqam, أمير الإنتقام | | |
| 1952 | Miss Fatimah | Al-Ustazah Fatimah, الأستاذة فاطمة | | |
| 1952 | An Egyptian in Lebanon | Masri Fi Lobnan, مصري في لبنان | | |
| 1953 | The Road to Happiness | Tariq al-Sa'adah, طريق السعادة | | |
| 1953 | The Pretty Mothers-in-law | El Hamawat El Fatenat, الحماوات الفاتنات | | |
| 1954 | Lady Pickpocket | Nashalah Hanem, نشالة هانم | | |
| 1954 | The Good Land | El Ard el Tayeba, الأرض الطيبة | | |
| 1954 | The Unjust Angel | Al-Malak al-Zalem, الملاك الظالم | | |
| 1955 | One Night.. | Hadasa Zata Layla, حدث ذات ليلة | | |
| 1955 | Flesh | Gasad, جسد | | |
| 1955 | Women of the Night | Banat al-Layl, بنات الليل | | |
| 1956 | The Stranger | Al-Gharib, الغريب | | |
| 1956 | The Absent Woman | Al-Ghae'bah, الغائبة | | |
| 1959 | The Unknown Woman | Al-Murra Al-Maghoola, المرأة المجهولة | | |
| 1960 | The Girls in Summer | Al Banat wa al-Saif, البنات و الصيف | | |
| 1960 | Inni Attahim | I Accuse, إني أتهم | | |
| 1961 | My Only Love | Hobbi al-Wahid, حبي الواحد | | |
| 1961 | Arabu no arashi | Arabu no arashi | | |
| 1962 | The Thief and the Dogs | Al-Lis wa al-Kilab, اللص و الكلاب | | |
| 1963 | Bedoin Girl in Love | Al-Badawiah al-'Ashiqah, البدوية العاشقة | | |
| 1963 | Cairo | Cairo | | |
| 1966 | The Pledge | Al-Wa'd, الوعد | | |
| 1966 | The Desert Renegades | Una Ráfaga de Plomo | | |
| 1967 | Nora | Nora, نورا | | |
| 1967 | House of Students | Bayt al-Talibat, بيت الطالبات | | |
| 1968 | The Man Who Lost His Shadow | Al-Ragol alazi Faqad Zilluh, الرجل الذي فقد ظله | | |
| 1972 | Confessions of a Woman | Eaterafat Imra’a, إعترافات امراة | | |
| 1973 | The Other Man | Al-Ragol Al Akhar, الرجل الآخر | | |
| 1975 | The Guilty | Al Mothneboon, المذنبون | | |
| 1975 | Karnak | Al-Karnak, الكرنك | | |
| 1984 | The Angels | Les Angels | | |
| 1986 | The Suicide of an Apartment Owner | Intihar Saheb Shaqqa, انتحار صاحب شقة | | |
| 1991 | Al-Gablawi | Al-Gablawi, الجبلاوي | | |
| 1993 | Terrorism and Kebab | Al-Irhab wal Kabab, الإرهاب و الكباب | | |
| 2006 | zaza is the president | zaz raees gamhoria,ظاظا رئيس جمهوريه | | |
