= Mahmoud Zulfikar =

Egyptian film director (1914–1970)

- محمود ذو الفقار
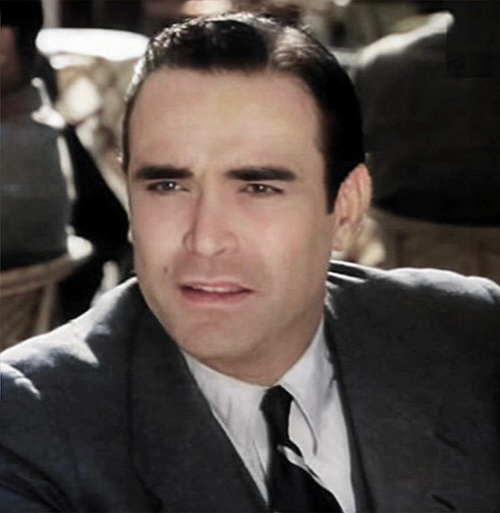
- Zulfikar in 1950
- Born: Mahmoud Qasdy Ahmed Mourad Zulfikar; 18 February 1914; Tanta, Khedivate of Egypt
- Died: 22 May 1970 (aged 56); Cairo, United Arab Republic
- Burial place: Cairo, Egypt
- Other names: Art Engineer; The Event Maker; Talent Finder
- Education: Architectural Engineering
- Alma mater: Cairo University
- Occupations: Engineer; film director; film producer; screenwriter; actor
- Years active: 1939–1970
- Spouses: Aziza Amir (m. 1940; died 1952); Mariam Fakhr Eddine (m. 1952; div. 1960)
- Children: Iman
- Father: Ahmed Mourad Bey Zulfikar
- Family: Zulfikar family

Mahmoud Zulfikar (Arabic: محمود ذو الفقار; 18 February 1914 – 22 May 1970) was an Egyptian film director, film producer, screenwriter, and actor. He was a figure in Egyptian film industry. He started his career as an architect, before starting his film career as an actor in 1939. Zulfikar was one of the most prominent artists in Egypt. He was known for his boldness and adventure with the new talents he presented to the Egyptian audience, later, he was nicknamed the "Talent Finder".

Growing up in an aristocratic family. He's also the elder brother of filmmaker Ezz El-Din Zulfikar and actor Salah Zulfikar. He obtained his high school diploma in 1930, then a bachelor's degree in architecture in 1935. He joined the Ministry of Endowments in the Islamic Decorations Department. There, he met the director Hussein Fawzy, who nominated him for the lead role in the film Bayayet El Tiffah (1939), and also the lead opposite the singer Malak in the film El awda il al rif (1939).

Afterwards, his films followed, thus beginning a long career in acting, followed by his career in filmmaking, being a notable multi-talented artist. He used technical calculations to film the scenes that were difficult to capture at the physical location. He also used his ideas to develop the final versions of his scripts for production. This earned him in Egypt the nickname of "The Event Maker". He assumed direct control over most aspects of his filmmaking, Zulfikar cultivated an expertise in screenwriting, directing, editing, and producing.

== Early life ==
Mahmoud Qasdy Ahmed Mourad Zulfikar was born on 18 February 1914, in Tanta, Egypt. Born to an aristocratic family of a prominent position in Egypt. His father, Ahmed Mourad Bek Zulfikar, served as a senior police commissioner in the Ministry of Interior and his mother Nabila hanem Zulfikar was a housewife. He was the fourth among eight siblings. His brother Mohamed who would grow up to be a businessman, Soad, Fekreya, Ezz El-Dine who would grow up to be a famous filmmaker. They were followed by brothers Kamal, Salah, the famous actor and producer and finally Mamdouh who would grow up to be a businessman.

== Career ==
Zulfikar graduated from faculty of engineering and worked as an architect in the Design Department at the Ministry of Works, but his passion for movie business encouraged him to make a career shift and become a filmmaker. He was an actor, film producer, screenwriter, and film director.

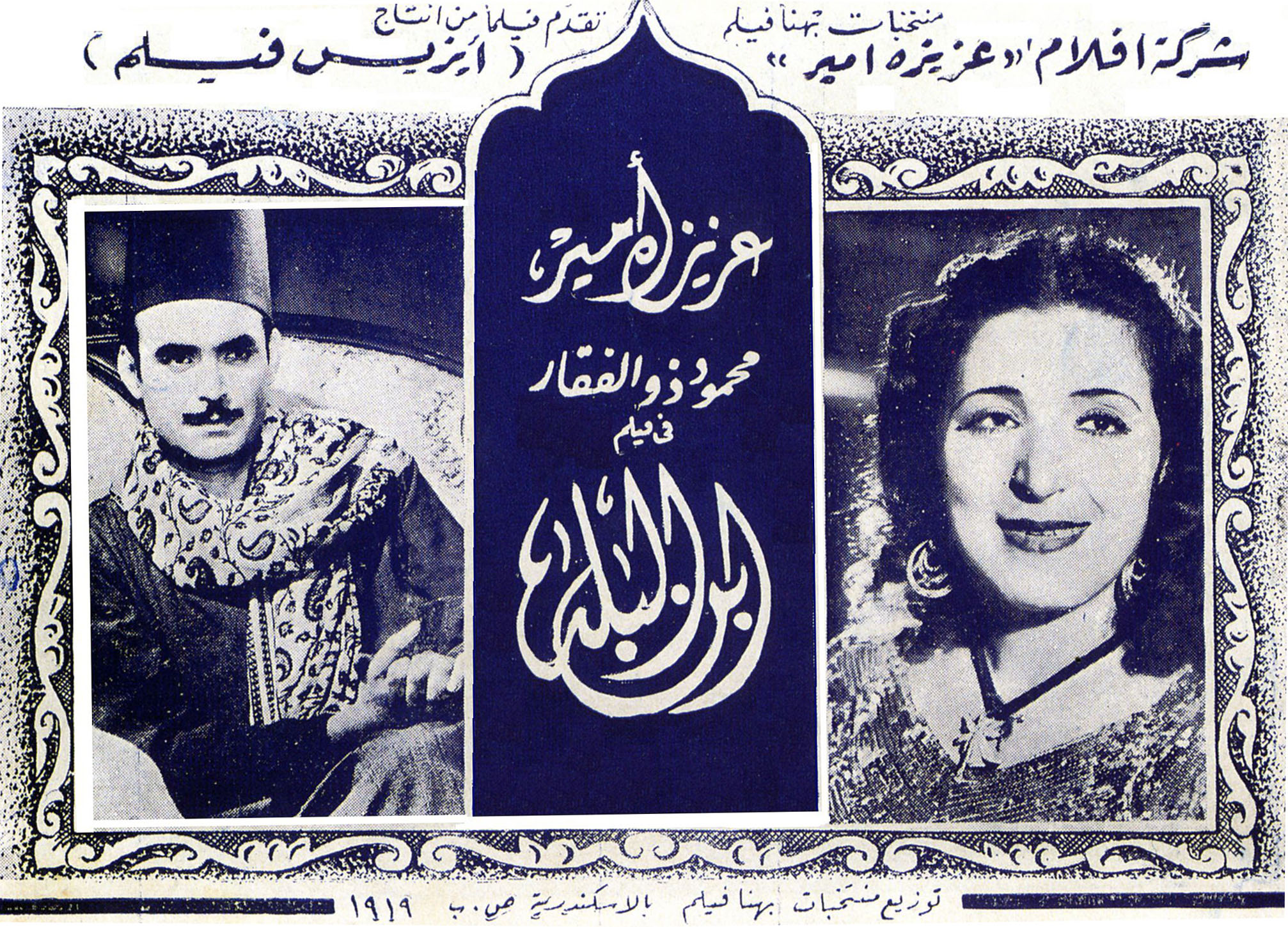
Zulfikar and Aziza Amir on the poster for Ibn El-Balad (1942)

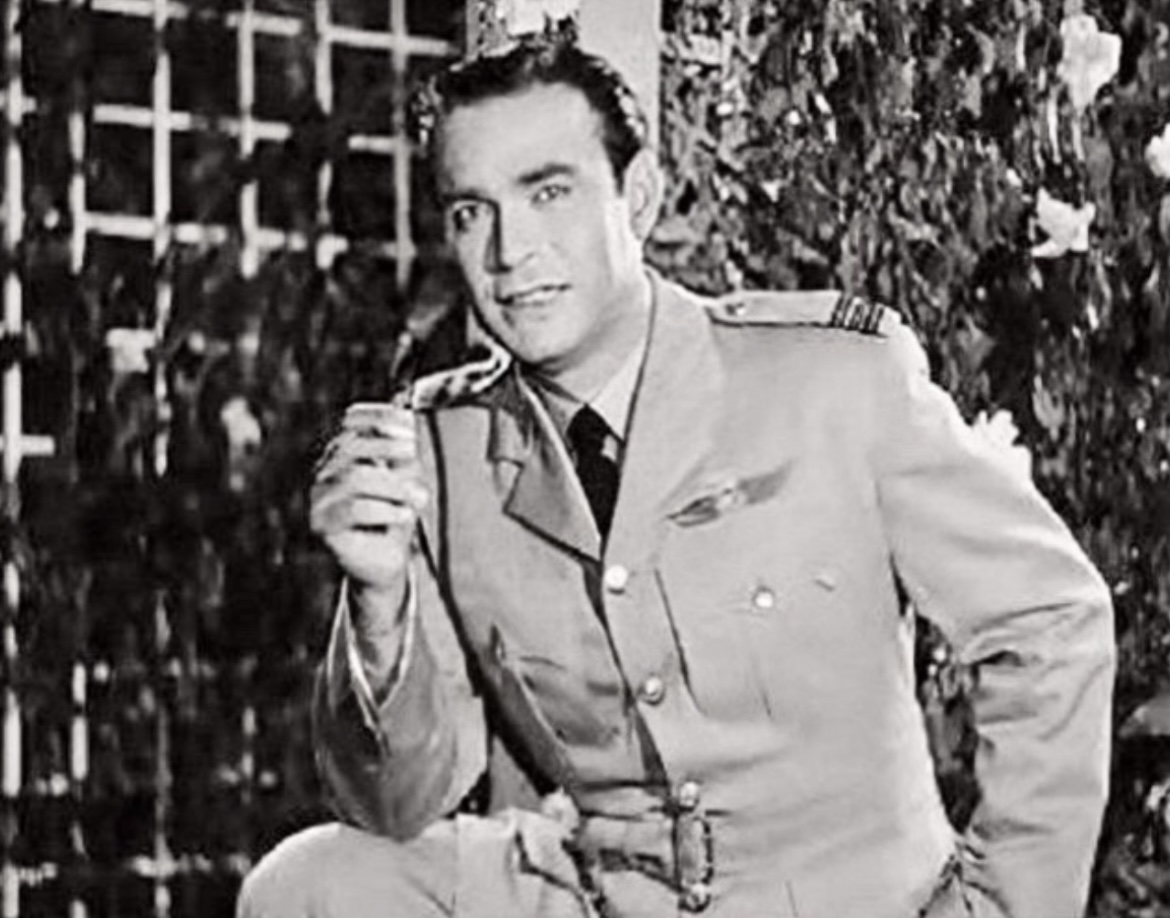
Zulfikar in A Girl from Palestine (1948)

He was a comprehensive artist. He is one of the most talented filmmakers in the history of Egyptian cinema. He started as an actor in 1939, and directed 44 films between 1947 and 1970. Zulfikar's films have been nominated for numerous awards both nationally and internationally. As an actor, his film debut was in Bayayet El Tiffah (1939). He starred in multiple commercial hits mostly as a director as well, including; Ibn El-balad (1942), El-Feloos (1945), Fauq Al Sahab (1947), Al lailu lana (1949), Akhlaq lil baye (1950), Qamar Arba'tashar (1950), and My Father Deceived Me (1951).

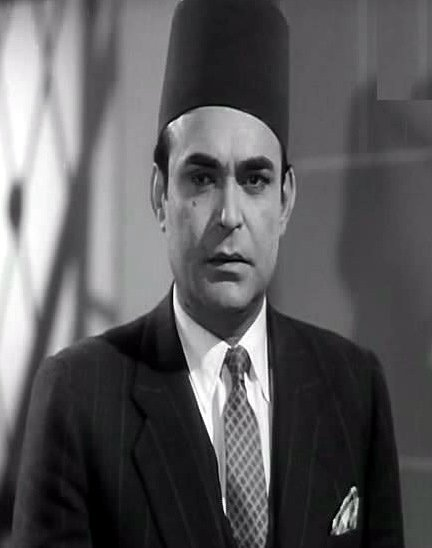
Zulfikar in Al lailu lana (1949)

Zulfikar's notable films as a writer, director included; A Girl from Palestine (1948), which Zulfikar also played the lead, plot evolved around the 1948 Palestine War, while Zulfikar played the character of an Egyptian Air Force pilot, whose plane crashes in a Palestinian village, and falls in love with a Palestinian girl which helps him to treat his injuries. Other films include; Amint Bi Allah (1953) and El Ard El Tayeba (1954).

In 1959, Zulfikar wrote the screenplay and directed The Unknown Woman, based on the French play Madame X. The film was a huge success and a breakthrough for the lead Shadia in a dramatic role, and It was the highest-grossing film in the Soviet Union for 1961, the only African film to ever achieve that. The 1960 film El Robat el Mukadass was produced by Ezz El-Dine Zulficar Films Company owned by his younger brothers Ezz El-Dine Zulficar and Salah Zulfikar, with the latter starring in the film alongside Sabah and Emad Hamdy.

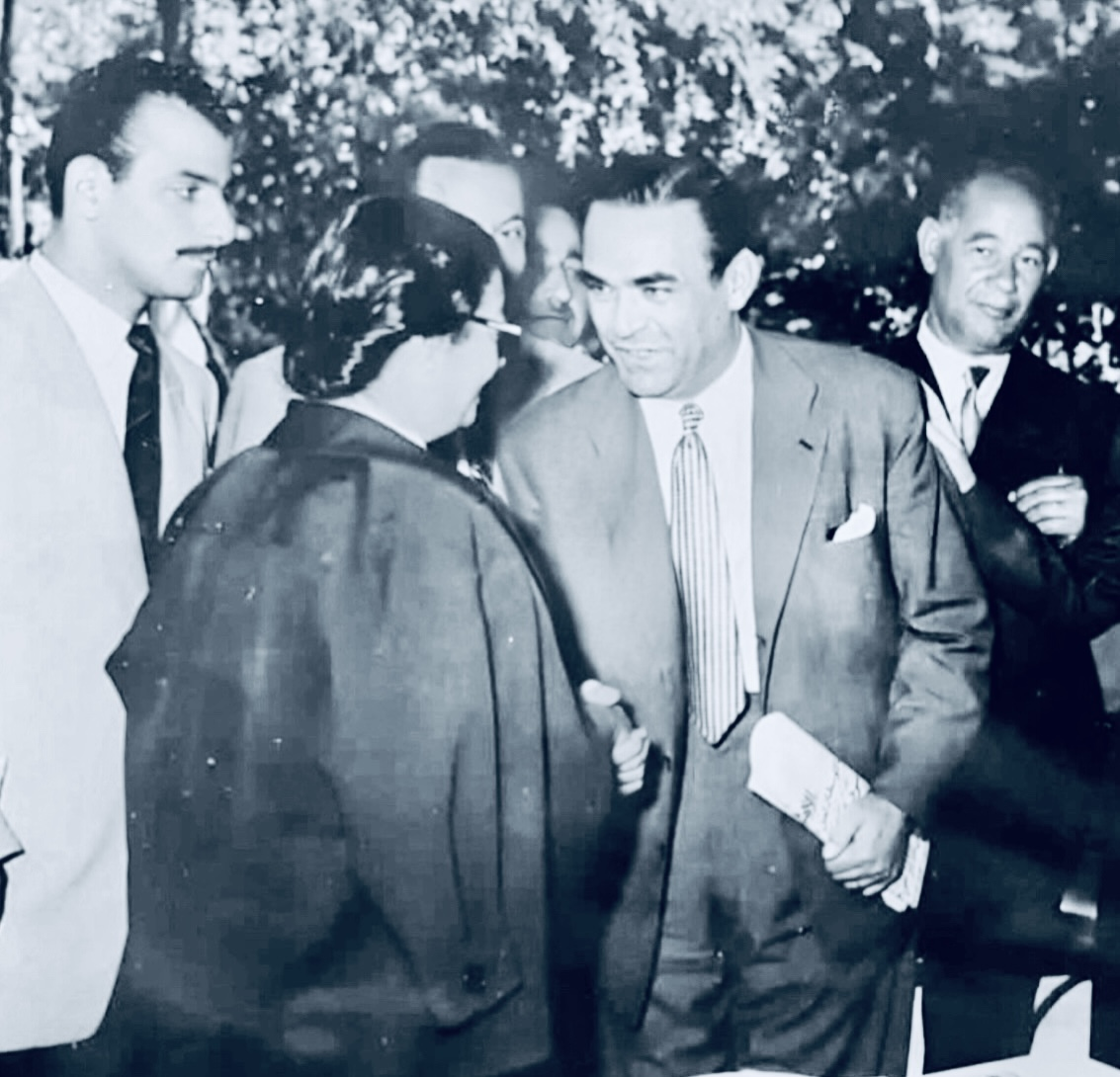
Zulfikar greeting Umm Kulthum in Cairo, 1958

Zulfikar's 1963 film Soft Hands was entered into the 14th Berlin International Film Festival and he was nominated for Silver Bear for Best Director. In For Men Only (1964), which Zulfikar co-written and directed, the film discussed gender equality through female gas engineers who disguised in men appearances to go to oil drilling locations which was banned for women. The 1965 romance Dearer than my Life was considered a different genre for Zulfikar while the film achieved critical and commercial success. Other notable films include; Al Khroug Men Al Guana (1967), The Splendor of Love (1968), and Featureless Men (1972) which was released posthumously. As a producer, he established his film production company in early 1940s, produced almost 10 films including; Miss Fatima (1952) and El Ard el Tayeba (1954).

== Personal life and death ==
Zulfikar married actress Aziza Amir, and together they made a successful duo. After her death he married Mariam Fakhreddine in 1952 and presented her to film industry, she became a famous actress in 1950s. They had one daughter, Iman. He's the elder brother of Ezz El-Dine, film director and producer, and Salah, actor and producer.

Zulfikar died suddenly of a heart attack at the age of 56 on 22 May 1970, in Cairo, Egypt.

== Filmography ==
=== Director ===
- 1947 Hedeya
- 1948 Fatat men Falastin
- 1948 Fauq al sahab
- 1949 Al lailu lana
- 1950 Virtue for Sale
- 1951 Kisma wa nassib
- 1951 Khadaini abi
- 1953 Amint bi Allah
- 1953 Ghaltat el umr
- 1954 Bint el jiran
- 1954 El Ard el Tayeba
- 1954 The Neighbor's Daughter
- 1955 Rannet el kholkhal
- 1957 Rihlah Gharamiyyah
- 1958 Shabab el-Yom
- 1959 Forbidden Women
- 1959 Touba
- 1959 The Unknown Woman
- 1960 El Imlak
- 1960 El Robat el Muqadass
- 1961 El Morahek el Kabir
- 1961 El Hub Keda
- 1961 La Tazkorini
- 1961 Mawad maal Maadi
- 1962 Bala Demoue
- 1963 Imra'a fi dawama
- 1963 El Motamarreda
- 1963 Soft Hands
- 1964 Sanawat el hub
- 1964 Thaman el hub
- 1965 Aghla min hayati
- 1965 Lel Regal Fakat
- 1966 El Moraheka el Saghira
- 1966 El Talata yuhebbunaha
- 1966 Adou el Mara'a
- 1967 Agazat Gharam
- 1967 Al Koubla al Akhira
- 1967 El Khouroug min el Guana
- 1967 Nora
- 1968 Hekayet thalass banat
- 1968 Thalath Nessa
- 1968 The Splendor of Love
- 1969 Girls' Secrets
- 1969 Fatat El Esste'rad
- 1970 Borj El-Athraa
- 1970 Imra'at Zawgy
- 1972 Regal bila Malameh

=== Writer ===
- 1944 Taqiyyat al Ikhfa (screenplay)
- 1945 Ibnati (story)
- 1945 El Feloos
- 1947 Fauq el sahab (script)
- 1951 Khadaini abi (story & screenplay)
- 1954 El Ard el Tayeba (story)
- 1958 Shabab el-Yom (Writer)
- 1963 Imra'a fi dawama
- 1964 Thaman el hub (writer)

=== Producer ===
- 1944 Hababa
- 1945 El-Bani Adam
- 1946 Shama'a Tahtareq
- 1947 Hedeya
- 1947 Alkul Yoghany
- 1948 Fauq el sahab
- 1951 Khadaini abi
- 1952 Amint Billah
- 1952 El-Ustazah Fatmah
- 1954 El Ard el Tayeba
- 1954 Bint El-Geeran

=== Actor ===
- 1939 Bayayet El Tiffah
- 1939 El awda il al rif
- 1941 El Warsha
- 1942 Masnaa el zawjate
- 1942 Ibn El-balad
- 1942 Wedding Night
- 1943 Wadi el Nogoom
- 1945 Al-Anissa Busa
- 1945 Al-Fulus
- 1945 Ibnati
- 1947 Hadaya
- 1947 Fauq el sahab
- 1948 Fatat men Falastin
- 1949 Afrah
- 1949 Nadia
- 1949 Al lailu lana
- 1950 Ayni bi-triff
- 1950 Akhlaq lel-Bai
- 1950 Qamar Arba'tashar
- 1951 Khadaini abi
- 1953 El shak el katel
- 1955 Assafir el Ganna
- 1957 Hareb minel hub
- 1968 El-Sit el-Nazra

== See also ==
- List of film directors
- Lists of Egyptian films
