= Intisar al-Shabab =

Intisar al-Shabab The Victory of Youth
- انتصار الشباب
- Directed by: Ahmed Badrakhan
- Written by: Omar Jamei (story); Badie' Khayri (dialogue)
- Starring: Asmahan; Farid al-Atrash; Stephan Rosti; Fouad Shafiq; Alwiya Gamil
- Edited by: Henry Barakat; Jamal Madkour
- Music by: Farid al-Atrash
- Production company: Talhalmi Brothers
- Release date: March 24, 1941
- Running time: 125 min.
- Country: Egypt
- Language: Arabic

Intisar al-Shabab (Arabic: نتصار الشباب, lit. 'The Victory of Youth, or The Triumph of Youth') is an Egyptian film released in 1941. It was the first film featuring sibling actor-singers Asmahan and her brother Farid al-Atrash, the latter of whom composed all the songs in the film. Al-Atrash presented the operetta-within-a-film ليلة في الأندلس (“A Night in Andalusia”), the first of several lyrical theatre pieces in Egyptian cinema, including text from poet Ahmed Rami quoted from The Barber of Seville. The operetta includes two acts with four scenes and features music in the maqam of Ajam.

When the film was shown in southern Syria in 1941, the Druze tribal men shot rifles at the screen in reaction to seeing actress Asmahan, who came from a noble Druze family, shown in the film in make-up and dressed in Western-style clothing.

== Synopsis ==
Waheed (Farid al-Atrash) and his sister Nadia (Asmahan) leave the Levant by train to follow their acting dreams, and on the train they meet teacher Al-Attar (Abdel Fatah Al Kasri). Al-Attar invites them to live with him and Umm Ismail (Mary Mounib) alongside the mediocre trio going by Jawz (Fouad Shafiq), Lawz (Hassan Fayek), and Bunduq (Hassan Kamel) (translated as “Walnut, Almond, and Hazelnut”). Upon hearing Wahid and Nadia, the troika leads them to Nojoom Al Lail (“Night Stars”) Casino, whose manager Khawaja Bechara Al-Gandhali (Bishara Wakim) becomes smitten with Nadia and hires all five performers. Next to encounter Nadia are a Pasha’s son named Muhyi (Anwar Wagdi) and his friend Fawzi (Abdel Salam Al Nabulsy). Nadia declines to date him at first, but he invites her to sing at a party in his manor and ends up marrying her, prompting Bechara to fire the whole troupe and Umm Ismail to evict them since she left the Casino and they cannot pay the housing fee without her revenues. Waheed reads an advertisement for cinema singers and auditions for music teacher Taha Taha (Stephan Rosti), whose jealousy scotches Waheed's chance, but Waheed does meet and fall in love with Taha's sister Ehsan (Rawhiyya Khaled). A record company director is impressed with his voice and books him on the radio, earning him fame and the income to rent an apartment in the tony Zamalek district of Cairo with Jawz and Umm Ismail (who are now married). When Muhyi's mother Bahia Hanim (Alwiya Gamil) learns that her new in-laws Nadia and Waheed are singers, she asks her son to divorce Nadia or leave home. Muhyi pursues Nadia as she leaves, and he crashes into a train and is taken to the hospital, where Nadia urges him to return home. Ehsan goes to Waheed's house and meets Nadia at the door, who lies to Ehsan that the siblings are married, prompting Ehsan and Taha to leave upset for the Levant. Unsure how to produce his operetta, Waheed turns to the Nut Trio, who trick Bechara into producing it to get closer to Nadia (who they tell Bechara is aiming to leave Muhyi); it ends happily ever after with the operetta a hit, Nadia returning to Muhyi, and Ehsan returning to Waheed.

== Crew ==
- Director: Ahmed Badrakhan
- Screenwriting: Omar Jamei (story), Ahmed Badrakhan (screenplay), Badie' Khayri (dialogue)
- Music: Farid Al-Atrash
- Producer: Gabriel Talhalmi
- Production Studio: Talhami Films (Talhalmi Brothers).

== Cast ==
- Farid al-Atrash (Waheed)
- Asmahan (Nadia)
- Anwar Wagdi (Muhyi)
- Bishara Wakim (Bechara)
- Abdel Salam Al Nabulsy (Fawzi)
- Alwiya Gamil (Bahia Hanim)
- Stephan Rosti (Taha Taha)
- Fouad Shafiq (Jawz)
- Hassan Fayek (Lawz)
- Hassan Kamel (Bunduq)
- Rawhiyya Khaled (Ehsan)
- Abdel Fatah Al Kasri (Master Al-Etr)
- Soraya Fakhry
- Mahmoud Ismail
- Mary Mounib (Umm Ismail)
- Abdelmonem Ismail
- Samia Gamal (dancer)

== Songs ==
Composer: Farid al-Atrash

- “إيدي في إيدك” (“My Hand Is in Your Hand,” lyrics by Bayram al-Tunisi)
- “إيدي في إيدك” (“Love Is Here,” lyrics by Mohamed Helmy Al-Hakim)
- “ليالي الأندلس” (“A Night in Andalusia,” lyrics by Ahmed Rami)
- “الشروق والغروب” (“Sunrise and Sunset,” lyrics by Bayram al-Tunisi)
- “صدوك عني العدا” (“The Anger from Me,” lyrics by Bayram al-Tunisi)
- “صوني الخدود” (“Sunny Cheeks,” lyrics by Bayram al-Tunisi)
- “وحيتاك” (“Haytak,” lyrics by Youssef Badros)
