= The Poor Millionaire (1959 film) =

- المليونير الفقير
- Directed by: Hasan El-Saifi
- Written by: Abdul Ghani Qamar (story); Abo El Seoud El Ebiary (script and dialogue)
- Produced by: Mary Queeny
- Starring: Ismail Yassine; Fayza Ahmed; Abbas Fares; Nagwa Fouad; Stephan Rosti; Zeinat Sedki; Reyad el-Kasabgy; Abdel Ghani al-Najdi; Baligh Habashy
- Release date: May 24, 1959
- Running time: 115 minutes
- Country: Egypt
- Language: Arabic

The Poor Millionaire (Arabic: المليونير الفقير, romanized: Al-Milyunayr Al-Faqir) is an Egyptian film released in 1959. It was directed by Hasan El-Saifi, and is starring Ismail Yassine, and Fayza Ahmed.

== Synopsis ==
A mayor sends Jaran Effendi (Ismail Yassine) to Cairo out with £E 500 to buy a net for his son. However, a thief (Abbas Fares) steals the money, and Jaran is forced to work in a hotel, where he meets and falls in love with the receptionist (Fayza Ahmed).

== Songs ==
Singer Fayza Ahmed performs four songs in the film, all featuring lyrics by Fathi Qura. The most famous number is “يا حلاوتك يا جمالك” (“Oh, Your Sweetness, Oh, Your Beauty”), including a melody by Farid al-Atrash. Duets with Ismail Yassine include “الأسانسير” (“Elevator,” with a melody by Abdel Aziz Mahmoud) and “أنا ح تجنن” (“I’m Going Crazy,” composed by Mounir Mourad). Finally, she sings another solo number entitled “عشان بحبك أنا” (“Because I Love You”), with music by Baligh Hamdi.

== External links and bibliography ==
- IMDb page
- El Cinema page
