= Mahmoud Ismail =

Egyptian actor, filmmaker (1914–1983)

- محمود إسماعيل
- Born: 18 March 1914; Kingdom of Egypt
- Died: 27 January 1983 (aged 68); Egypt
- Occupations: Actor, film director, screenplay writer

Mahmoud Ismail (1914–1983; Arabic: محمود إسماعيل) was an Egyptian actor of stage and film, a screenplay writer, and a film director. Ismail worked on more than 40 film projects, including acting in some twenty five films and six television series.

== Biography ==
Ismail began his artistic career as a theater actor in the Egyptian National Theatre Troupe. He was a Sufi, and had lived in the Al-Hussein neighborhood of Cairo.

As an actor in film he frequently worked with film directors Ahmed Badrakhan, Niazi Mostafa, Hassan Hilmy, and Hasan El-Saifi. He often played characters that had a criminal past or villains (such as thieves, thugs, and drug dealers). Ismail disappeared from the film scene for a few years, then returned again to appear on screen intermittently in films and television miniseries’s in the late-1970s and early-1980s. Ismail was also a prolific screenplay writer.

== Filmography ==
=== As actor ===
- The Victory of Youth (1941) (Arabic: نتصار الشباب, romanized: Intisar al-Shabab)
- On the Stage of Life (1942) (Arabic: على مسرح الحياة (فيلم), romanized: Ealaa Masrah Alhaya)
- Aida (1942 film) (Arabic: عايدة, romanized: Eayida), directed by Ahmed Badrakhan
- Who's Too Old (1943) (Arabic: من فات قديمه, romanized: Men Fat Adeem)
- Who is the Criminal? (1944) (Arabic: من الجاني, romanized: Al Jani), directed by Ahmed Badrakhan
- The Magic Cap (1944) (Arabic: طاقية الإخفاء, romanized: Taqiyyat al ikhfa, lit. 'The Concealment Cap'), directed by Niazi Mostafa
- My Daughter (film) (1944) (Arabic: ابنتي, romanized: Ibnati), directed by Niazi Mostafa
- Antar and Abla (1945) (Arabic: عنتر وعبلة, romanized: Antar we Abla), directed by Niazi Mostafa
- Hassan and Hassan (1945) (Arabic: حسن وحسن, romanized: Hassan we Hassan, lit. 'good and good'), directed by Niazi Mostafa
- The White Shark (1945), directed by Ibrahim Emara
- Sons of Adam (1945 film) (1945) (Arabic: البني آدم, romanized: Al-Bunni Adam), directed by Niazi Mostafa
- The Return of the Magic Cap (1946) (Arabic: عودة طاقية الإخفاء, romanized: Awdat Taqiyyat al ikhfa, lit. 'The Return of the Invisibility Cap'), directed by Mohamed Abdel Gawad
- Hunchback (film) (1946) (Arabic: الأحدب, romanized: Al Ahdab), directed by Hassan Hilmy
- Light from Heaven (1947) (Arabic: نور من السماء, romanized: Nour Minel Samaa), directed by Hassan Hilmy
- Seduction (1948 film) (1948) (Arabic: فتنة, romanized: Fatna)
- Beware of Pickpockets (1949 film) (Arabic: أوعى المحفظة, romanized: Ouah el mahfaza, lit. 'Aware the Wallet')
- The Secret Is Safe (1952) (Arabic: السر في بير, romanized: Elserr fi Beer), directed by Hassan Hilmy
- The Rule of Time (1953) (Arabic: حكم الزمان, romanized: Hukum el zama), directed by Henry Barakat
- The Black Knight (1954 Egyptian film) (1954) (Arabic: الفارس الأسود, romanized: El Fares El Eswed), directed by Niazi Mostafa
- Allah maana (1955) (English: God Is on Our Side ), directed by Ahmed Badrakhan
- Samara (1956 film), directed by Hasan El-Saifi
- Zannuba (1956) (Arabic: زنوبة), directed by Hasan El-Saifi
- The Scornful Man (1956) (Arabic: النمرود, romanized: Nimrod), directed by Atef Salem
- Lawahez (1957) (Arabic: لواحظ), directed by Hassan al-Imam
- Tahera (film) (1957) (Arabic: طاهرة), directed by Fatin Abdel Wahab
- The Suspect (1957 film) (Arabic: المتهم, romanized: El mottahem), directed by Kamal Attia
- Love Festival (film) (1958) (Arabic: مهرجان الحب)
- Touha (1958 film) (Arabic: توحة), directed by Hasan El-Saifi
- Samara's Ghost (1959) (Arabic: عفريت سمارة), directed by Hassan Reda
- Love and Flirtation (1959) (Arabic: حب ودلع, romanized: Hub wa Dalaa)
- The Florist (film) (1959) (Arabic: بياعة الورد, romanized: Bayieat alwird)
- The Girl from the Neighborhood (1964) (Arabic: بنت الحتة, romanized: Bint el hetta), directed by Hasan El-Saifi
- Stupid Boy (1977 film) (Arabic: الولد الغبي), directed by Madkour Thabit
- Without Sin (miniseries) (1980) (Arabic: بلا خطيئة, romanized: Bila Khatia’)
- The Red Trail (1980) (Arabic: الدرب الأحمر, romanized: Al-Darb Al-Ahmar)
- Lucky Shore (1983) (Arabic: شاطئ الحظ)

=== As director ===
- Seduction (1948 film) (1948) (Arabic: فتنة, romanized: Fatna)
- Beware of Pickpockets (1949 film) (Arabic: أوعى المحفظة, romanized: Ouah el mahfaza, lit. 'Aware the Wallet')
- Love and Flirtation (1959) (Arabic: حب ودلع, romanized: Hub wa Dalaa)
- The Florist (film) (1959) (Arabic: بياعة الورد, romanized: Bayieat alwird)

=== As screenwriter ===
- The Florist (film) (1959) (Arabic: بياعة الورد, romanized: Bayieat alwird)
- The Girl from the Neighborhood (1964) (Arabic: بنت الحتة, romanized: Bint el hetta), directed by Hasan El-Saifi
