= The Holy Man (1959 film) =

- المبروك
- Directed by: Hassan Reda
- Written by: Mahmoud el-Meliguy (story); Mohamed Othman (scenario and dialogue)
- Produced by: Mahmoud el-Meliguy
- Starring: Mariam Fakhr Eddine; Emad Hamdy; Mahmoud el-Meliguy; Alwiya Gamil; Omar el-Hariri; Samiha Ayoub; Mohamed Tawfik; Kadreya Kadry
- Cinematography: Sobhi Basta
- Edited by: Hussein Afifi; Nahed Makkawi; Sayed Bassiouni; Nadia Shukri
- Music by: Fouad el-Zahery
- Production company: Silver Star Films
- Distributed by: Heliopolis Films
- Release date: 1959
- Running time: 95 minutes
- Country: Egypt
- Language: Arabic

The Holy Man (Arabic: المبروك, transliterated Al-Mabrouk) is an Egyptian film released in 1959. The film is based on Molière's play Tartuffe.

== Cast and crew ==
=== Cast ===
- Mariam Fakhr Eddine
- Emad Hamdy
- Mahmoud el-Meliguy
- Alwiya Gamil
- Omar el-Hariri
- Samiha Ayoub
- Mohammed Tawfik
- Kadreya Kadry
- Naima Wasfi
- Awatef Ramadan
- Zaki Ibrahim
- Sameera Hussein
- Abdelmoneim Bassiouni
- Abbas el-Daly
- Mohamed Shaaban
- Neamat el-Meligy
- Hussein Ismail
- Abdul Hamid Badawi
- Hamada Jalal
- Abdelmoneim Abdelrahman
- Sayed el-Araby
- Samia Mohsen
- Fifi Said
- Ali Kamel
- Dongel (Ajami Abdel Rahman)
- Khairiya Khairy
- Nadia Ezzat

=== Crew ===
- Mahmoud el-Meliguy (producer)
- Ali Kamel (production manager)
- Silver Star Films (studio)
- Syed Ghorab (production manager)
- Abdulaziz Ali (production assistant)
- Hassan Abduljalil (production assistant)
- Saleh al-Awadi (production assistant)
- Hussein Tawfik (production supervisor)
- Andrea Zendels (sound engineer)
- Artisat Sabbagh (dialogue recorder)
- Ali Muhammad (voice mixer)
- Syed Abdulrahman (voice mixer)
- Hussein Afifi (editor)
- Nahed Makkawi (negative)
- Sayed Bassiouini (film synthesis)
- Nadia Shoukry (music editor)
- Maher Abdelnour (set design)
- Hussein Sharif (props)
- Dongel (Ajami Abdel Rahman) (props)
- Ali Hassan (camera director)
- Ali Khairallah (cameraman)
- Mohamed Shaker (assistant cameraman)
- Hassan Reda (director)
- Mohamed Galal (assistant director)
- Hussein Omar (script)
- Mahmoud Samaha (makeup)
- Ahmed Desouky (makeup assistant)
- Al-Ahram Studios (printing and developing)
- Toto Khoury (celluloid lab manager)
- Mahmoud el-Meliguy (story writer)
- Mohamed Othman (screenplay and dialogue writer)
- Sobhi Basta (cinematographer)
- Fouad el-Zahery (music)
- Kamal Merhi (arranger)
- Heliopolis Films (distributor)

== Synopsis ==
The titular holy man cons people into believing in his alleged powers. Asked to treat a woman named Zainab, he researches her family to burnish his credibility. When confronted about the scam, he becomes increasingly evasive.
