= Nashid al-Amal =

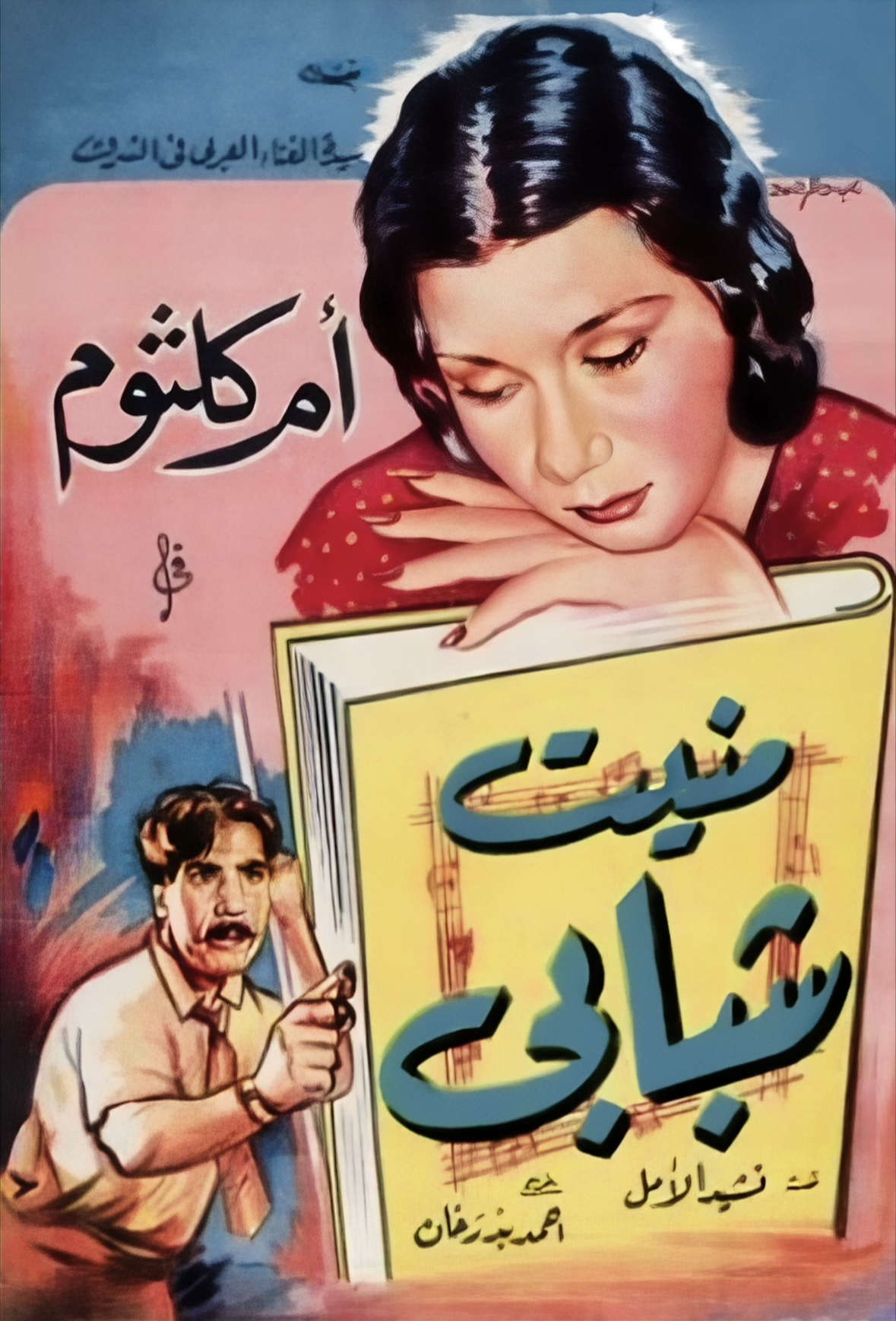
- Theatrical release poster
- نشيد الأمل
- Directed by: Ahmed Badrakhan
- Written by: Edmond Twima (story); Ahmed Rami (dialogue and screenplay)
- Starring: Umm Kulthum; Zaki Tulaimat; Mary Mounib; Abbas Fares; Fouad Shafiq; Stephan Rosti
- Release date: January 11, 1937
- Country: Egypt
- Language: Egyptian Arabic

Nashid al-Amal (Egyptian Arabic: نشيد الأمل, lit. “Song of Hope”) is an Egyptian film starring Umm Kulthum. It is written by Edmond Twima and Ahmed Rami. Directed by Ahmed Badrakhan, it ran for 125 minutes and was released on January 11, 1937. The film marks the directorial debut of Ahmed Badrakhan.

== Synopsis ==
Ismail divorces his wife Amal, abandoning her and their daughter Salwa. Destiny leads her to the doctor Assem, Salwa’s pediatrician, who notices Amal’s singing talent and helps her build a career. This prompts Amal’s opportunist ex-husband to try and win her back.

== Cast ==
- Umm Kulthum
- Zaki Tulaimat
- Mary Mounib
- Abbas Faris
- Fouad Shafiq
- Stephan Rosti
- Hassan Fayek
- Mahmoud El Sebaa
- Abdulaziz Khalil

== Songs ==
All nine songs feature lyrics by Ahmed Rami. Composers include the following:

- Mohamed el-Qasabgi:
  - "منيت شبابي" (“There Goes My Youth”)
  - "نامي نامي" (“Nami Nami”)
  - "يا بهجة العيد" (“Oh, the Joy of Eid!”)
  - "يا للي صنعت الجميل" (“Oh, How Beautiful You Are”)
  - "يا مجد يا اشتهيتك" (“O Glory, Oh My Desires”)
- Riad Al Sunbati:
  - "افرح يا قلبي" (“Rejoice, My Heart”)
  - "قضيت حياتي" (“I Dedicate My Life”)
  - "نشيد الجامعة" (“The Mosque Song”)
  - "يا شباب النيل" (“Oh, Nile Youth!”)

== See also ==
- List of Egyptian films of the 1930s
