= Love and Revenge =

1944 film by Youssef Wahbi

Gharam wa intiqam, Love and Revenge
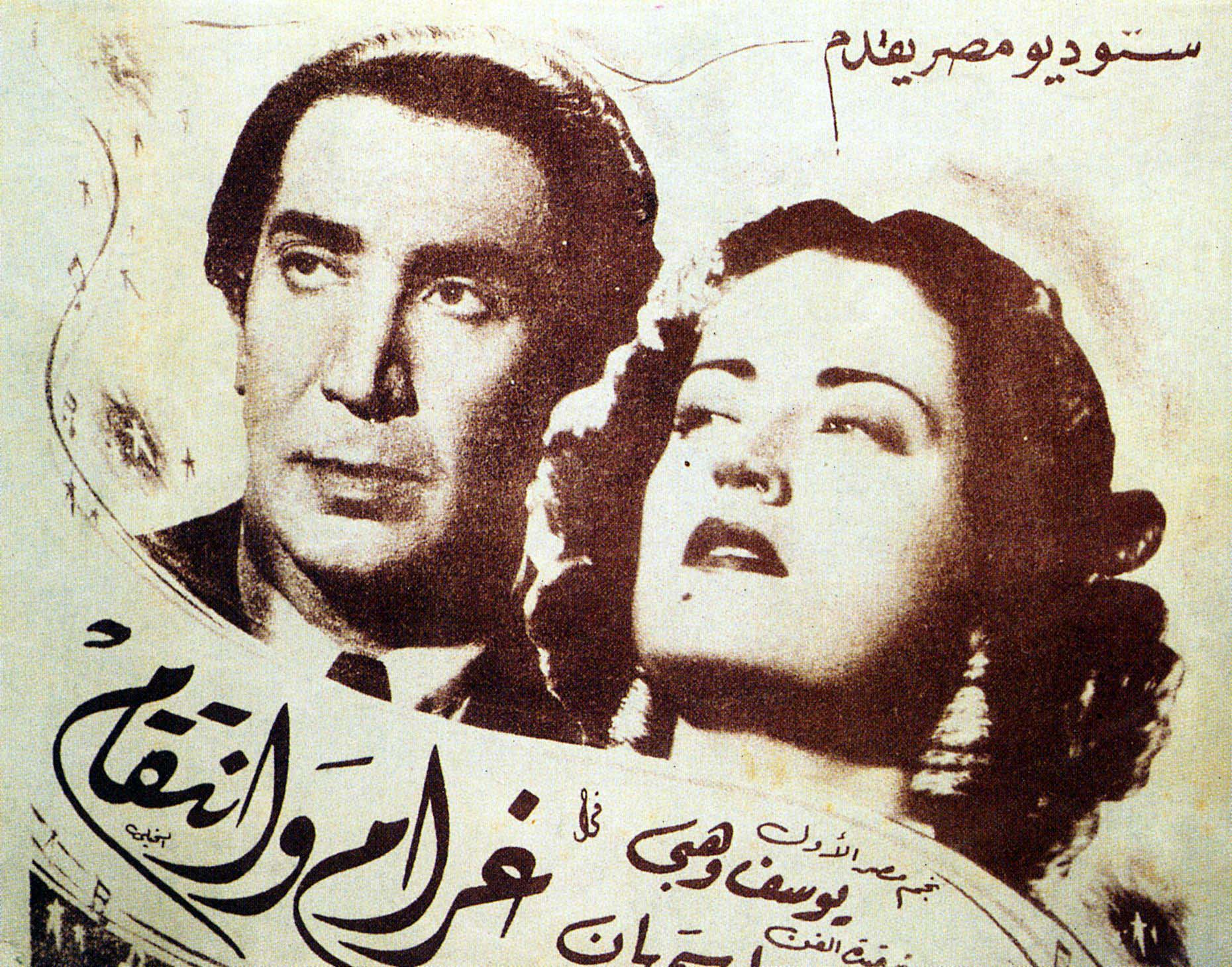
- Directed by: Youssef Wahbi
- Written by: Youssef Wahbi adopted from Corneille's Le Cid
- Produced by: Studio Misr
- Starring: Youssef Wahbi; Asmahan; Anwar Wagdi
- Music by: Farid al-Atrash
- Release date: 1944
- Running time: 125 minutes
- Country: Egypt
- Language: Egyptian Arabic

Gharam wa intiqam (English: Love and Revenge) is a 1944 Egyptian film directed by Youssef Wahbi.

This drama was a great success in its time, partially due to the unexpected death of its star in a car accident, the famous singer Asmahan, when she was only 31. Several of Asmahan's most successful songs were recorded for this movie, such as Layali el Ouns fi Vienna (Nights of Love in Vienna), and Emta Hata'raf (When Will You Know).

== Synopsis ==
Suhair Sultan (Asmahan), a famous actress and songstress, performs her final play before retiring so she can marry her lover, Wahid Izzat (Anwar Wagdi). On the first day of their honeymoon, Wahid is killed under mysterious circumstances. The investigation reveals that the primary suspect in his murder is his friend, a mysterious figure named Gemal Hamdy (Youssef Wahbi). Suhair attempts to seduce Gemal to get her revenge, and avenge her lover's death.

== Songs from the Movie ==
All the songs in the movie were recorded by Asmahan prior to filming. They are organized here in order of appearance in the movie.

Song	Name Translation	Words by	Music by
Layali el Ouns fi Vienna	Nights of Love in Vienna	Ahmed Rami	Farid al-Atrash
Ayyuhal Na'im	You Who Sleeps	Ahmed Rami	Riad Al Sunbati
Ahwa	I Desire (Coffee Song)	Ma'moun Al-Shanawy	Farid al-Atrash
Emta Hata'raf	When Will You Know	Ma'moun Al-Shanawy	Mohamed El Qasabgi
Ana Elli Asatahel	I Deserve This	Bayram al-Tunisi	Mohamed El Qasabgi
Ana Bint el Nil*	I'm the Daughter of the Nile	Ahmed Rami	Riyad Al Sunbati

- Also called Mawakeb El-Ezz (Procession of Might), Unshudat Al-Majd (Anthem of Glory) or Nashid al-Usra al-Alawiyya (The Alawiyya dynasty Anthem), was a song in praise of the Muhammad Ali dynasty, the royal family of Egypt. It was censored out of the movie following the 1952 revolution that ousted King Farouk and overthrew the Muhammad Ali dynasty. The final version of the movie no longer has this song or any scenes involving it. Thus, its placement in the list does not represent its actual place in the original version of the film.

== Controversies ==
All attention and anticipation towards the film was focused on the sudden and untimely death of Asmahan about two weeks before filming was completed. Doubles were hired to complete Asmahan's scenes for the movie. Wahbi took several decision to transform the film into a dedication to Asmahan. Although he had planned to have a happy ending for the film, he rewrote the ending of the movie so that it ended with Suhair's sudden death in a car accident, with his character, Gemal, going mad afterwards. Wahbi also used Asmahan's body in the final scene when Suhair's body, covered in a white sheet, is moved from a car into her house past Gemal as he is informed of the news of Suhair's accident. Lastly, the decision to proceed with filming the movie and eventually releasing it was taken by Wahbi. All of the decisions that Wahbi undertook to complete the film and to dedicate it to Asmahan were, and are still today considered highly controversial. Some have accepted Wahbi's explanation of taking these decisions out of respect and admiration for Asmahan, while others have condemned them as acts of disrespect, accusing Wahbi and Studio Misr of capitalizing on Asmahan's death to carry the movie's success, as well as the questionable decision to use her body, though shrouded completely, in the film.
