= Summer Skin =

Summer Skin may refer to:

- Summer Skin (song), a song by Death Cab for Cutie
- Summer Skin (film), a 1961 Argentine film
