= Nile Fountain =

Fountain in Cairo, Egypt

Coordinates: 30°02′10″N 31°13′28″E

The Nile Fountain is a fountain situated in the middle of the Nile River in Cairo, Egypt. Built in 1956, it is the oldest river fountain in the Middle East. It was renovated in 2021 by Arab Contractors.

== History ==
The Nile Fountain was built in 1956 by a West German company, Julius Berger. The construction was supervised by the Ministry of Municipal and Rural Affairs. During the 70s and 80s, the fountain experienced failures and several attempts were made to repair the fountain. As a result, the government operated the fountain only during official occasions. However, the fountain stopped operating later.

In 2017, the governor of Cairo Governorate, Atef Abdel-Hamid, announced an agreement to restore the fountain. In April 2018, the government started the renovation project. The renovation project, which was carried out by Arab Contractors, began in 2020, and in January 2021, the renovations were complete, making the Nile Fountain operational again after 40 years of inactivity.

== Description ==
The Nile Fountain is located in the middle of the Nile River, near to the Gezira island. It consists of two levels. The upper level has a diameter of 9 meters. The water comes out, in the middle of the fountain, that is one meter high, and has sixteen flashlights underwater. The water then overflows onto another level from which 32 small fountains emerge, along with 32 underwater flashlights. The lower level has 64 pipes where surplus come out of it, on a water curtain body. The level also has sixteen electric flashlights that serve as decoration as well as a warning for boats from approaching the fountain. The water is pushed by a pump powered by a 950-horsepower engine. It can push water 125 meters high, and is illuminated at night. The fountain has 30 to 40 unique styles, with each style changing every three to five minutes.

== In popular culture ==
The fountain is featured in multiple Egyptian films, including the 1963 film Bride of the Nile and the 1963 film Soft Hands. It is also featured in two of singer Amr Diab's songs, namely "Al Qahira" and "Ya Baladna Ya Helwa", in addition to a commercial.
