= List of submissions to the 34th Academy Awards for Best Foreign Language Film =

1961 Best Foreign Language Film submissions

Highlights
- Oscar winner: (Sweden) Through a Glass Darkly
- Submissions: 14
- Debuts: 3

This is a list of submissions to the 34th Academy Awards for Best Foreign Language Film. The Academy Award for Best Foreign Language Film was created in 1956 by the Academy of Motion Picture Arts and Sciences to honour non-English-speaking films produced outside the United States. The award is handed out annually, and is accepted by the winning film's director, although it is considered an award for the submitting country as a whole. Countries are invited by the Academy to submit their best films for competition according to strict rules, with only one film being accepted from each country.

For the 34th Academy Awards, thirteen films were submitted in the category Academy Award for Best Foreign Language Film. Argentina, Austria and Switzerland submitted films for the first time. France and Italy both failed to be nominated for the first time since the introduction of the competitive award. The five nominated films came from Denmark, Japan, Mexico, Spain and Sweden.

Sweden and Ingmar Bergman won for a second year in a row with Through a Glass Darkly, which was also nominated for Best Original Screenplay in the subsequent ceremony (35th Academy Awards).

== Submissions ==
Submitting country	Film title used in nomination	Original title	Language(s)	Director(s)	Result
Argentina	Summer Skin	Piel de verano	Spanish	Leopoldo Torre Nilsson	Not nominated
Austria	Jedermann		German	Gottfried Reinhardt	Not nominated
Denmark	Harry and the Butler	Harry og kammertjeneren	Danish	Bent Christensen	Nominated
Egypt	Love and Faith	وا إسلاماه	Arabic	Enrico Bomba & Andrew Marton	Not nominated
France	Last Year at Marienbad	L'Année dernière à Marienbad	French	Alain Resnais	Not nominated
West Germany	The Miracle of Father Malachia	Das Wunder des Malachias	German	Bernhard Wicki	Not nominated
India	Stree	स्त्री	Hindi	Rajaram Vankudre Shantaram	Not nominated
Italy	The Night	La Notte	Italian	Michelangelo Antonioni	Not nominated
Japan	Immortal Love	永遠の人	Japanese	Keisuke Kinoshita	Nominated
Mexico	The Important Man	Ánimas Trujano	Spanish	Ismael Rodríguez	Nominated
Philippines	The Moises Padilla Story		Tagalog, Filipino	Gerardo de León	Not nominated
Spain	Plácido		Spanish	Luis García Berlanga	Nominated
Sweden	Through a Glass Darkly	Såsom i en spegel	Swedish	Ingmar Bergman	Won Academy Award
Switzerland	The Shadows Grow Longer	Die Schatten werden länger	German	Ladislao Vajda	Not nominated

== Sources ==
- Margaret Herrick Library, Academy of Motion Picture Arts and Sciences
