= Oh Islam =

1961 film

- Directed by: Enrico Bomba; Andrew Marton
- Written by: Robert Andrews; Enrico Bomba
- Produced by: Enrico Bomba; Ramses Naguib
- Starring: Ahmed Mazhar; Lobna Abdel Aziz; Rushdy Abaza
- Cinematography: Wahid Farid
- Release date: 20 October 1961
- Running time: 97 minutes
- Country: Egypt
- Language: Arabic

Oh Islam (Arabic: وا اسلاماه, translit. Wa Islamah, and also released as Love and Faith) is a 1961 Egyptian drama film directed by Enrico Bomba and Andrew Marton. The film was selected as the Egyptian entry for the Best Foreign Language Film at the 34th Academy Awards, but was not accepted as a nominee. The film was the first Egyptian film to be screened at the San Francisco International Film Festival.

== Cast ==
Egyptians

- Ahmed Mazhar as Mahmoud (Qutuz)
- Rushdy Abaza as Baibars
- Lobna Abdel Aziz as Jihad
- Emad Hamdy as Aybak
- Taheyya Kariokka as Shajar al-Durr
- Mahmoud el-Meliguy as Faris ad-Din Aktai
- Farid Shawki as Bltai
- Mahmoud el-Meliguy as Aktai

Italians

- Ema Andi
- Franco Carelli
- Federico Chentrens
- Mario Dionisi
- Luisa Mattioli
- Folco Lulli as Aktai
- Silvana Pampanini as Shajar al-Durr

== See also ==
- List of submissions to the 34th Academy Awards for Best Foreign Language Film
- List of Egyptian submissions for the Academy Award for Best Foreign Language Film
