= Hassan Mokhtar =

Qatari footballer

Personal information
- Date of birth: 26 January 1944 (age 82)
- Place of birth: Port Said, Egypt
- Date of death: 5 March 2016 (aged 72)
- Place of death: Giza, Egypt
- Position: Goalkeeper

Senior career*
Years	Team	Apps	(Gls)
–1966	Port Fouad SC		
1966–1969	El Qanah FC		
1969–1974	Ismaily SC		
- Al-Arabi SC

International career
- Egypt
- Qatar

Managerial career
- 1980: Al-Arabi SC
Medal record
Men's Football
Representing United Arab Republic
Africa Cup of Nations
Third place	1970 Sudan
- * Club domestic league appearances and goals

Hassan Mokhtar (Arabic: حسن مختار; 26 January 1944 - 5 March 2016) was a football manager and footballer. Born in Egypt, he was an Egypt and Qatar international.

== Playing career ==
Mokhtar started his playing career with Egyptian side Port Fouad SC, helping the club achieve promotion from the second tier to the top flight. Subsequently, he signed for Egyptian side El Qanah FC in 1966, helping the club achieve promotion from the second tier to the top flight. Three years later, he signed for Egyptian side Ismaily SC, helping the club win the 1969 African Cup of Champions Clubs. Following his stint there, he signed for Qatari side Al-Arabi SC. Egyptian newspaper Youm7 wrote in 2021 that he was "considered one of the most prominent goalkeepers in the history of Egyptian football".

== Managerial career ==
After retiring from playing professional football, Mokhtar worked as a goalkeeper coach for the Qatar national football team and later in Saudi Arabia. In 1980, he returned to Qatari side Al-Arabi SC as manager after working as the club's goalkeeper coach.

== Personal life ==
Mokhtar was born on 26 January 1944 in Port Said, Egypt and died on 5 March 2016 in Giza, Egypt. Married to Egyptian actress Ragaa Al Geddawy, he had a daughter and obtained Qatari citizenship.

== Honours ==
United Arab Republic

- African Cup of Nations: 3rd place, 1970
