= Asmahan =

Egyptian/Syrian singer (1912–1944)

Asmahan أسمهان
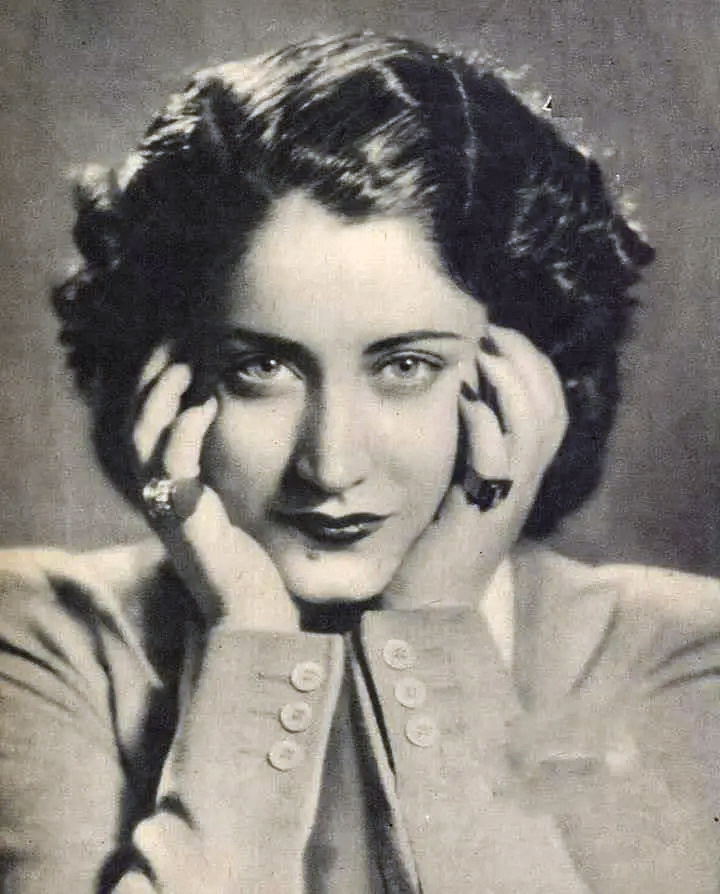

Background information
- Born: Amal al-Aṭrach آمال الأطرش; 25 November 1912; On board ship, Mediterranean Sea
- Died: 14 July 1944 (aged 31) Mansoura, Kingdom of Egypt
- Genres: Egyptian music Arabic music
- Occupation: Singer
- Years active: 1931–1944
- Formerly of: Farid al-Atrash

Amal al-Atrash (Arabic: آمال الأطرش, romanized: Āmāl al-Aṭrash, North Levantine pronunciation: [ʔaːˈmaːl elˈʔɑtˤraʃ]; November 25, 1912 – July 14, 1944), known professionally as Asmahan (Arabic: أسمهان, romanized: Asmahān, pronounced [ʔasmaˈhaːn]), was a Syrian and Egyptian singer.

Having immigrated to Egypt at the age of three years old from Syria, her family knew the composer Dawood Hosni, and she sang the compositions of Mohamed El Qasabgi and Zakariyya Ahmad. She also sang the compositions of Mohammed Abdel Wahab and her brother Farid al-Atrash, a then rising star musician in his own right. Her voice was one of the few female voices in the Arab music world to pose serious competition to that of Umm Kulthum, who is considered to be one of the Arab world's most distinguished singers of the 20th century.

Her mysterious death in an automobile accident shocked the public. Journalists spread gossip about her turbulent personal life and an alleged espionage role in World War II.

== Early life ==
Asmahan was born to prince Fahd al-Atrash, a Syrian Druze from Suwayda, and princess 'Alia al-Mundhir, a Lebanese Druze from Hasbaya. Her father came from the Druze al-Atrash clan, well known in Syria for its role in fighting against the French occupation.

Asmahan's father supposedly served as governor of the district of Demirci in Turkey, during the last days of the Ottoman Empire, when he fled the country with his children and pregnant wife. On 25 November 1912, they embarked on a ship from İzmir to Beirut, and Asmahan was born on board. She was named "Amal", meaning "hope". She was also called "Emily", but always preferred the name "Amal". After the French came into power, the family returned to Jabal al-Druze.

Following the Adham Khanjar incident in 1922, the al-Atrash home in al-Qrayya (a town in Jabal al-Druze) was bombed by French forces. 'Alia fled with her children to Damascus and, despite orders from Fahd, refused to return. Asmahan later recalled her childhood years in Jabal al-Druze as "untouched by anything truly bad". 'Alia and the three children travelled to Beirut, but, after discovering that the French were searching for them there, they stopped in Haifa in Palestine, and travelled from there to Egypt, where she sought political asylum for herself and her three children; they were later granted the right of political asylum in 1926 by the Egyptian Government, thus naturalized as Egyptian citizens.

=== Immigration to Egypt ===
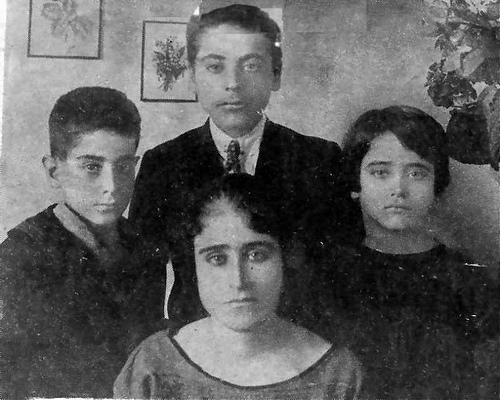
'Alia and her children after arrival in Egypt

'Alia chose to immigrate to Cairo, because she knew that Egypt's then nationalist prime minister Saad Zaghloul and her husband's relative, Sultan al-Atrash were on corresponding terms. According to family accounts, 'Alia was permitted to enter Egypt under the sponsorship of Saad Zaghloul. Many other Syrians and Lebanese were present in Egypt in this period.

Asmahan and her family first lived in an apartment in a humble section of Cairo. Her mother did laundry and sewing to support the family. She had an excellent voice, could play the `ud, sang at parties and made some recordings. Asmahan and her brothers attended a French Catholic school. In order to receive waivers for the high cost of tuition, 'Alia registered them under the alias Kusah (meaning "courgette") rather than trying to convince school officials that members of the wealthy al-Atrash family were destitute. 'Alia received a monthly stipend from a secret benefactor rumored to be "Baron" Crane (of the King–Crane Commission) according to one Egyptian journalist. This allowed her to cover the costs of her children's school's tuition, and a nicer apartment on Habib Shalabi Street.

== Career ==
=== Musical debut ===
Amal's vocal talent was discovered at an early age. Once, when her brother Farid received one of Egypt's most famous composers, Dawood Hosni, in their home, the latter overheard her singing in her room, and insisted on seeing her immediately. He then asked her to sing again. He was much impressed by the performance, and suggested the stage name of Asmahan to her. Amal began using that name.

Asmahan rose to fame quickly: she was not even fourteen (or seventeen, since her birth date is disputed) years old when she was introduced to the public at a concert at the prestigious Cairo Opera House. She sang and recorded songs composed by Farid Ghosn, Dawood Hosni, Mohamed El Qasabgi, and Zakariyya Ahmad. At fourteen, Asmahan was invited by an Egyptian record company to make her first album, featuring her first song, "Ya Nar Fouadi", by Farid Ghosn.

A variety of teachers advanced her vocal and musical studies. Hosni volunteered to instruct Asmahan on how to play the oud; Qasabgi comments however on the mature level of her sight reading and musicality by the time she performed his work, some years later. However, her brothers wanted her to marry and return to Syria. Her cousin, Hassan al-Atrash travelled to Egypt, bringing with him a different cousin interested in Asmahan, however, once Hassan, who had already married five times, saw Asmahan, he pursued her and she returned to Syria for at least four years, interrupting her musical career.

=== Egypt's influence ===
Since Asmahan sang in Egypt, the lyrics of her songs were written in classical Arabic and in a more colloquial Arabic, but she also sang in the Eastern dialect of Arabic. Asmahan was said to have previously replicated songs by Umm Kulthum. When asked to sing about cultural patriotism and love, she sang of Egypt." Since singers and studios depended on the elites, Asmahan had to sing songs on uplifting nationalist themes or in praise of the Egyptian royal family. At the beginning of her career she sang in the nightclub owned by Mary Mansour, Sala Masriyya.

Asmahan's older brother, Fuad, and other Druze relatives considered a career in entertainment for a girl to be disgraceful. For them, culturally, "Egypt was a planetary distance from the small villages of the Druze." and it was difficult for her relatives to accept Asmahan's integration into the heterogeneous Egyptian social scene. The clearly defined divisions, along religious lines, of the Syrian countryside did not operate in Egypt. During the period when she was married to her cousin, Hassan, and then later in 1941, when she remarried him and returned to Egypt, her musical career came to a standstill. When the marriage first broke up, she left for Egypt immediately, even before she had obtained the bill of divorce. With her return to Egypt and a singing career, she finally repudiated "respectability" by appearing onscreen (she had not appeared in "Layla Majun" but her voice is featured) leaving both her relatives and Syrian Druze society furious. When her first film, Intisar al-Shabab, was released in Syria, one young Druze shot at the screen when the character played by Asmahan appeared. Asmahan, bi-national or, in contemporary parlance, trans-national by then, had become "a sophisticated foreigner to the young men in the Jabal Druze."

== Personal life ==
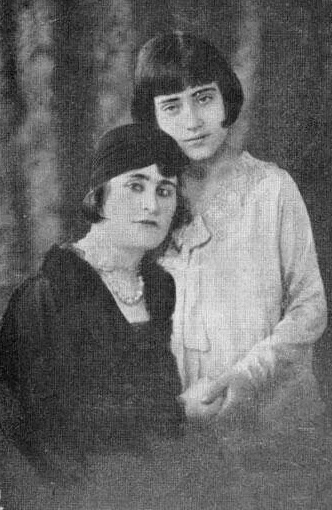
Asmahan with her mother 'Alia al-Mundhir

In 1933, Asmahan's cousin, Hassan al-Atrash, came to Cairo and proposed marriage, requesting that Asmahan abandon her musical career. She agreed on three conditions: that they live in Damascus rather than Jabal al-Druze, winter in Cairo, and that she would never be required to wear the traditional hijab. They married and moved first to 'Ara where the al-Atrash retain a large home, and then built their own home in Suwayda. Asmahan gave birth to her daughter, Kamellia. Eventually, Asmahan missed her career and her life in Cairo; and in 1939, she and Hassan were divorced. In her final confrontation with her cousin at Mena House Hotel in Giza, she told him, "I stood with you for independence and liberation, I did. But, I was created for another purpose. I prefer the work of Farid, and the work of Umm Kulthum, and of art." She returned to Cairo and resumed her singing career, entering a short marriage to Egyptian director Ahmed Badrakhan.

In 1941, she returned to Syria in a dramatic and secret journey under the auspices of the British. Hassan agreed to meet with her, and used the occasion to successfully entreat her to remarry him. During the time they were married, she twice attempted suicide. Tabloid newspapers suggested that this was so that she could obtain a second divorce from Hassan; however, it seemed he actually agreed due to her visits to King David Hotel, Jerusalem where wild rumours attached to her behaviour and overspending. Her third and final marriage was to the Egyptian director Ahmed Salem, supposedly to facilitate her return to Egypt over impositions by government authorities. It is unclear how that would occur, however, and she had an ongoing studio contract in Egypt. Asmahan was close friends with the al Othman family and met with them when she travelled to Haifa, Palestine, when they helped her.

Also in 1941, Asmahan met Mohammed Abdel Wahab, Egypt's most distinguished singer and composer, and starred with him in his operetta Magnun Layla ("Besotted with Layla"). Abdel Wahab introduced her to the journalist, Mohamed al-Taba'i, who suggests that she was in love with him, but the tone of his writing indicates that he was in love with her, but did not respect her. He suggests she had affairs or at least an ongoing relationship with the royal chamberlain Ahmed Pasha Hassanein but this might be exaggerated. Her brothers, Fuad and Farid, were no longer able to monitor her movements. Her brother was a noted gambler; she and her friends also partied, smoked, drank and gambled. She became very ill for a period, but recordings show that her voice did not suffer.

Asmahan was proud of her family background, and always mentioned her father and his cousin, Sultan al-Atrash, to clarify her ancestry — once saying to al-Taba'i, after he had just insulted her, "Don't you know who I am? Why I am the daughter of Fahd al-Atrash and cousin to the Amir al-Atrash and the Druze revolutionary hero Sultan al-Atrash. Asmahan was not a first cousin of Hassan's, but referred to him as "ibn 'ammi" to the Egyptians, in fact, she was his second cousin, twice removed (by generation).

== Vocal characteristics ==
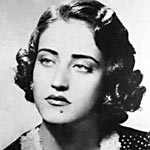
Asmahan

Asmahan's noted wide vocal range included contralto and dramatic mezzo-soprano (as one can hear in her rendition of "Ya Tuyur" where she reaches a high A with ease and brio). Asmahan's voice has been compared to Fairuz and Sabah. However, as she began her career more than two decades earlier, she had not in fact, adopted the Italian singing technique known as bel canto, but rather learned singing from many admirable models of her own period and in Egypt where a much more diverse group of singers performed, and at a time when Arabic singing utilized both nasal and chest resonance.

Asmahan's voice was powerful, but also agile. She generally sang in her chest register but could use her head register and sing in a very controlled tone. It is not incorrect to say that she was the first or one of the first Arabic singers to use the classical western technique, also very few performers are able to alternate two different styles of interpretation and technique in one song (Western and Arab).

== Role in World War II ==
In 1941, during World War II, Asmahan returned to the French Mandate of Syria (Syria, then under the rule of Vichy France) at the request of the British and the Free French. She was on a secret mission to notify her people in Jabal al-Druze that the British and Free French forces would be invading Syria through their territory, and to convince them they should not fight. The British and Free French had promised the independence of Syria and Lebanon to all inhabitants on the date of the invasion. The Druze agreed, even though some groups did not receive word in time and fought the invading forces. After the Allies secured Syria during the Syria-Lebanon Campaign, General Charles de Gaulle visited Syria. When the Allies failed to carry out their promise for Syrian independence, Asmahan tried to contact the Nazis in Turkey, but was stopped at the border and sent to Lebanon. It was also possible that Asmahan needed money because her husband had cut off her expenses, so she may have tried to reach the Germans simply to obtain funds.

Asmahan told Mohamed al-Taba'i that she was to receive the sum of £40,000 from the British for her services to the allies. General Charles de Gaulle's representative in Cairo was General Georges Catroux. Catroux's délégué in Damascus, Colonel Collet, stated that the British gave money to Asmahan (and to other Druze men, in his presence) and sent her to the Jabal to secure the support of the Druze before the Allies' invasion. The same information is stated by Edward Spears in his memoirs.

== Death ==
On 14 July 1944, a car carrying Asmahan and a female friend crashed and went into a canal at the side of the road, after the driver lost control near the city of Mansoura, Egypt. The car was a two-door model and the women were sitting in the backseat. They were presumed to be rendered unconscious and subsequently drowned. The driver, however, managed to escape.

These circumstances gave rise to many suspicions, rumours and conspiracy theories. British intelligence, for example, after many reports circulated claiming she had been working for them, was accused of having got rid of her after she had attempted to meet with German agents. The German Gestapo was also accused of murdering her for the help she had given the British. Her husband at the time had fought violently with her, and her family's honour had been besmirched by the many rumours.

Asmahan was buried in Egypt in accordance with her wishes.Years later, her two brothers, Fouad and Farid al-Atrash, were also buried in the Fustat plain in Cairo, a site that she and Farid, together with Abdel Halim Hafez, had restored to some of its former glory.

== Legacy ==
The Egyptian Media Production City and a private investor jointly produced a television series depicting the life (and death) of Asmahan. The Arabic series debuted during the month of Ramadan in 2008. Asmahan was played by Syrian actress Sulaf Fawakherji.

On 25 November 2015, Google celebrated Asmahan's 103rd birthday using a Google doodle.

== Filmography ==
- Intisar al-Shabab ("Triumph of the Youth"), 1941
- Gharam wa Intiqam ("Love and Revenge"), 1944

== See also ==
- List of Druze

== Sources ==
- al-Taba'i, Muhammad (2008), Asmahan Tells Her Story, Dar al-Shorouk Press
- Zuhur, Sherifa (1998), Images of Enchantment: Visual and Performing Arts of the Middle East, American University in Cairo Press, ISBN 977-424-467-2
- Zuhur, Sherifa (2000), Asmahan's Secrets: Woman, War, and Song, University of Texas Press, ISBN 978-0-292-79807-6
- Zuhur, Sherifa (2001), Colors of Enchantment: Theater, Dance, Music and the Visual Arts of the Middle East, American University in Cairo Press, ISBN 977-424-607-1
