= Pity My Tears =

Irham Dmoo`i
- VHS cover
- Directed by: Henry Barakat
- Written by: Henry Barakat; Yussef Issa
- Produced by: Wahid Farid; Ramses Naguib
- Starring: Shukry Sarhan; Rushdy Abaza; Faten Hamama
- Cinematography: Wahid Farid
- Release date: 1954
- Country: Egypt
- Language: Arabic

Irham Dmoo`i (Arabic: ارحم دموعي, Pity My Tears) is a 1954 Egyptian drama film directed by Henry Barakat. It stars Shukry Sarhan, Rushdy Abaza, and Faten Hamama. The film received awards from the Egyptian Ministry of Guidance and the Lebanese film ceremony.

== Plot ==
Faten Hamama plays Amal, whose father loses most of his money and almost goes bankrupt. She gets abandoned by her fiancé. The owner of a nearby factory steps up and offers to help her father until his conditions get better. Amal marries this man, but their life together as a couple turns out to be boring. Amal, who wasn't very excited about their relationship initially, slowly discovers her husband's good qualities, and their life turns into a happy one.
