= Prisoners of Darkness =

1952 film

- Directed by: Enrico Bomba
- Written by: Weiss Ruffilli
- Based on: La cieca di Sorrento by Francesco Mastriani
- Produced by: Sandro Bomba
- Starring: Milly Vitale; Folco Lulli; Eduardo Ciannelli
- Cinematography: Tino Santoni
- Edited by: Edmond Lozzi
- Music by: Carlo Innocenzi
- Production company: Bomba Film
- Distributed by: Zeus Film
- Release date: 1952
- Running time: 88 minutes
- Country: Italy
- Language: Italian

Prisoners of Darkness (Italian: Prigionieri delle tenebre) is a 1952 Italian historical melodrama film directed by Enrico Bomba and starring Milly Vitale, Folco Lulli and Eduardo Ciannelli. The film's sets were designed by the art director Virgilio Marchi. It is based on the 1852 novel La cieca di Sorrento by Francesco Mastriani.

== Plot ==
Bourbon Naples. Oliviero Pisani is the son of Amedeo Pisani, who kills the Marchesa Rionero during a theft in the villa of the Rionero marquises. Oliviero goes to study in London and becomes a great ophthalmologist who will restore sight to the daughter of the marquise, Beatrice, who became blind due to Amedeo during the robbery in the villa.

== Cast ==
- Milly Vitale as Beatrice Rionero
- Folco Lulli as Amedeo Pisani
- Eduardo Ciannelli as Marquis Rionero
- Lucien Gallas as Tommaso Basileo
- Giulia Lazzarini as Tina
- Franco Malavasi as Totonno
- Roberto Bruni as Cav. Amadeo Checco
- Armando Francioli as Oliviero Pisani
- Alberto Farnese
- Franco Pesce

== Bibliography ==
- Chiti, Roberto & Poppi, Roberto. Dizionario del cinema italiano: Dal 1945 al 1959. Gremese Editore, 1991.
