= Huda (film) =

- هدى
- Directed by: Ramses Naguib
- Starring: Lobna Abdel Aziz; Emad Hamdy; Hussein Riad; Hassan Youssef; Abdel Moneim Ibrahim; Omar el-Hariri
- Release date: November 9, 1959
- Country: Egypt
- Language: Arabic

Huda (Arabic: هدى) is an Egyptian film released on November 9, 1959, and based on the play Dark Victory. The film is directed by Ramses Naguib (his debut film) and features a screenplay by Mohamed Abu Youssef- and Hamed Abdel Aziz.

== Synopsis ==
Huda is a cheerful girl who lives with her uncle Ibrahim. Headaches are revealed to be cancer. Kamal, a doctor colleague of her uncle, falls in love with her, but she spurns him, believing it to be out of pity.
