= Letter from an Unknown Woman (1962 film) =

- رسالة من امرأة مجهولة
- Directed by: Salah Abu Seif
- Written by: Fathi Zaki (screenplay); Khaireya Khairy (screenplay); El-Sayed Bedeir (actor); El-Sayed Bedeir (dialogue); Fathy Ghanem (author of The Message)
- Story by: Stefan Zweig
- Based on: Letter from an Unknown Woman
- Produced by: Salah Zulfikar
- Starring: Farid al-Atrash; Lobna Abdel Aziz
- Cinematography: Ali Hassan
- Edited by: Walaa Salah el-Din
- Music by: Farid al-Atrash (songs); Andre Ryder (score)
- Production company: Salah Zulfikar Films Company
- Distributed by: Ramses Naguib (Cairo); Nouri and Saleh Productions (Damascus)
- Release date: October 22, 1962
- Running time: 120 minutes
- Country: Egypt
- Language: Egyptian Arabic

Letter from an Unknown Woman (Arabic: رسالة من امرأة مجهولة, transliterated as Ressalah min emraa maghoula) is an Egyptian film released on October 22, 1962. The film is directed by Salah Abu Seif, based on the 1922 titular short story by Austrian writer Stefan Zweig, and produced by Salah Zulfikar, while it stars Farid al-Atrash and Lobna Abdel Aziz.

== Synopsis ==
Ahmed Sameh (Farid al-Atrash) is a famed singer-songwriter who lives a life of dissipation as he indulges in alcohol and women. He remains a deceptively lonely bachelor despite the efforts of associates such as Dr. Monem (Abdel Moneim Ibrahim) and Nevin (Laila Karim) to make marriage matches for him. On his birthday, Ahmed receives a lengthy letter he would have thrown away save for a note on the envelope saying it reveals an unknown secret in his life, and so he promptly reads what turns out to be a missive from a girl named Amal (Lobna Abdel Aziz), a former neighbor who peeped at him from her window. She falls in love with his music and threw her pillowcase on his balcony to enter his house, where she befriends Ibrahim Aman (Fakher Fakher), Ahmed’s servant; on her way out, she encounters Ahmed, who praises the beauty of her eyes and gifts her a box of chocolates.

Amal’s mother Khadija (Mary Mounib), marries a man named Umar Mahfouz Yaqoub Mikhail, and they move to Mansoura. Amal finishes her studies and fields a proposal from Hosni (Kamal el-Zeiny), but she dismisses her suitor and travels to Cairo to live with her aunt Fatima (Amina Rizk) and work at an insurer. She stalks Sameh’s house several times until she is caught by Ibrahim, who asks her to stay awhile at the apartment, where he tells her all the latest on Ahmed. She visits the distraught man and is slashed by his car wheels, for which he apologizes. They travel a deserted road back and his car hits a pothole, so Fawaz al-Ghafir (Abdel Ghani Nagdi) calls them a valet back to one of the empty apartments, thinking that they are a couple; they consummate the relationship that he forgot and that he remembered.

Fatima says the situation needs to be hidden after visiting Ibrahim and finding Sameh still non-responsive. Amal takes her leave from work to give birth to a son she names Sameh (Youssef Hosni and returns to work with a wedding ring. She gets to know Mr. Said Kamel (Hussein el-Sayed), a client of the insurer who helps her in her work. She encounters Ahmed, who tells her he thought he had seen her before, once again and goes to his house, only to leave when he thinks she was a prostitute. A speeding car hits Sameh Jr., who needs a blood transfusion. Unable to secure his blood type, Amal sends for Ahmed, who rushes to the hospital to donate blood to his son.

== Cast ==
- Farid al-Atrash (Ahmed Sameh)
- Lobna Abdel Aziz (Amal)
- Mary Mounib (Khadija, Amal’s mother)
- Amina Rizk (Amal’s aunt)
- Fakher Fakher (Ibrahim Aman, Ahmed’s servant)
- Abdel Moneim Ibrahim (Dr. Monem)
- Laila Karim (Nevine)
- Hussein el-Sayed (Said Kamel)
- Yaqoub Mikhail (Umar Mahfouz)
- Abdel Ghani Nagdi (Fawaz al-Ghafir)
- Nawal Abul Foutouh
- Ezzat El Alaili (Ahmed Sameh’s friend)
