= Bride of the Nile =

Bride of The Nile
- Directed by: Fatin Abdel Wahab
- Written by: Saad Eldin Wahba; Kamel Youssef; Lobna Abdel Aziz
- Produced by: Ramses Naguib
- Starring: Lobna Abdel Aziz; Rushdy Abaza
- Cinematography: Ali Hassan
- Edited by: Hussein Ahmed
- Music by: Ali Ismael
- Release date: 2 November 1963
- Running time: 105 minutes
- Country: Egypt
- Language: Egyptian Arabic

Bride of The Nile (Arabic: عروس النيل, translit. A'roos El Nil, aliases: Nile's Bride) is a 1963 Egyptian fantasy film directed by Fatin Abdel Wahab. It stars Lobna Abdel Aziz and Rushdy Abaza.

== Synopsis ==
Geologist Sami goes to Luxor to oversee oil exploration. He is told that drilling is prohibited because the area is used as a burial ground for the Nile Brides. Sami sees a beautiful girl dressed as a Nile Bride named Hamis, who demands that he stop drilling. She tells him that she is the daughter of Aten, the sun god, and the last Nile Bride, and that her father sent her to Earth to prevent the desecration of the Nile Brides' tombs.

== Cast ==
- Lobna Abdel Aziz as Hamis
- Rushdy Abaza as Samy Fouad
- Shwikar as Didi
- Abdel Moneim Ibrahim as Fathy
- Fouad Shafiq as Dr. Hassan, the Archaeologist
- Abdel Khaleq Saleh as Didi's father and company president
- Esmat Mahmoud as Layla - Dr. Hassan's assist ant
- Hussein Ismail as Rashwan
- Dr. Shadeed as Psychiatrist
- El Deif Ahmed as Patient at the Psychiatric Hospital
- Salama Elias
- Ibrahim Hashmat
- Soheir Magdy
- El Khawaga Bigo
- Saleh El Eskandarani
- Hassan Atla
- Mohamed Idris
- Linda Badawi
- Baligh Habashi
- Mohamed Ahmed El Masry

== Crew ==
- Director: Fatin Abdel Wahab
- Idea: Lobna Abdel Aziz
- Story: Fayek Ismail
- Screenplay: Fayek Ismail, Kamel Youssef
- Dialogue: Saad El Din Wahba
- Cinematography: Ali Hassan
- Editor: Hussein Ahmed
- Music Score: Ali Ismail
- Producer: Ramses Naguib
- Domestic Distribution: Arab Cinema Company
- International Distribution: United Cinema (Sobhi Farhat)

== See also ==
- Cinema of Egypt
- Lists of Egyptian films
- List of Egyptian films of the 1960s
