= Secret Agent 777 =

Agente segreto 777 - Operazione Mistero
- Directed by: Enrico Bomba
- Written by: Arpad DeRiso, Dean Marton (novel), Nino Scolaro
- Produced by: Pier Luigi Torri
- Cinematography: Bitto Albertini
- Edited by: Enzo Alfonzi
- Music by: Marcello De Martino
- Release date: 1965
- Running time: 94 minutes
- Country: Italy
- Language: Italian

Agente segreto 777 - Operazione Mistero or Secret Agent 777 is a 1965 Italian spy film directed by Enrico Bomba. Its plot includes several science fiction and horror elements. The location is set in the Middle East, in Lebanon. It has a sequel, Secret Agent 777: Ticket to Die, directed by the same Bomba and released the same year.

== Cast ==
- Tiziano Cortini as Lewis Jordan/Zaraf/Secret Agent 777
- Mark Damon as Dr. Bardin
- Mary Young as Professor's Daughter
- Seyna Seyn as Dr. Serens
- Stelio Candelli as Dr. Dexter (credited as Stanley Kent)
- Aldo Bufi Landi as Richard, the "dead man"
- Isarco Ravaioli as Professor's Assistant
- Walter Neng
- María Badmajew
- Franca Duccio
