= Maya Casabianca =

French-Israeli singer (1940–2018)

Maya Casabianca מאיה קזביאנקה
- Born: Margalit Azran; 1940; Casablanca, Morocco
- Died: 31 December 2018 (aged 78) Israel
- Occupation: Singer

Maya Casabianca (Hebrew: מאיה קזביאנקה; 1940 – 31 December 2018) was a French-Israeli singer.

== Biography ==
Born Margalit Azran in Morocco in 1940, Casabianca came to Paris in the late 1950s. At age 13, she was discovered by producer Jacques Canetti and was hired by Philips Records to compete with Dalida. She performed at the Olympia Bruno Coquatrix with Yves Montand and chose her stage name in reference to her hometown of Casablanca.

She gained popularity both in France and in numerous Arab nations, particularly for her songs Oui, devant Dieu and Garde-moi la dernière danse. She was a mistress of the famous Egyptian singer Farid al-Atrash. She moved to Haifa, Israel in the 1970s to continue her career. She would move back and forth from France to Israel, participating in Pascal Sevran's show numerous times. She had sung in several Arab countries such as Lebanon and Syria, hiding her Jewish identity and her links with Israel at the request of her producers. The singer recounted how she had fled Syria after a concert in Damascus because she was being pursued by the Syrian secret services who had discovered her identity, reported Haaretz. After living in Paris for a while, she returned to live in Israel to join her daughter and grandchildren.
