= I Am Free =

Ana Horra
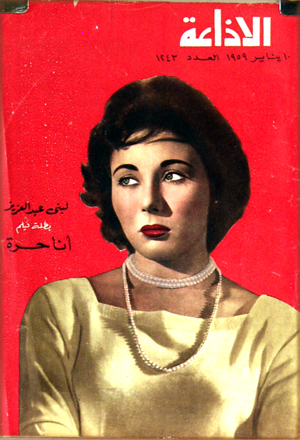
- Cover of journal Al-Eza'ah featuring the film
- Directed by: Salah Abu Seif
- Written by: Ihsan Abdel Qudous
- Starring: Lobna Abdel Aziz; Hassan Yusef; Shoukry Sarhan; Hussein Riyad; Zouzou Nabil; Mohammad Abd al Qudoos
- Release date: January 11, 1959
- Running time: 115 min.
- Country: Egypt
- Language: Arabic

Ana Horra or Ana Hurra (Arabic: أنا حرة, English: I Am Free) is a 1959 Egyptian drama starring Lobna Abdel Aziz.

Ana Horra is associated with the onset of a feminist context to Egyptian films in the 1960s. The film is also known as part of Salah Abu Seif's Empowerment of Women Trilogy. At its time, this film defied the conservative conventions of Egyptian society and the role of women within it.

== Plot summary ==
The film is an account of a college girl's frustrations with the predominantly male patriarchal system in Egypt. Released in 1959, the film captures much of the feminist sentiments of the 1960s and its widespread fervor in Egypt. The film's protagonist, Amina, played by Lubna Abdel Aziz, is a young woman living with her aunt's family which includes her uncle and her cousin. The men in her life further reinforce the themes of male dominance in the film with their restriction on her life.

== Characters ==
- Amina (Lobna Abdel Aziz)- Amina is a young girl unable to accept Egyptian societies male-biased gender roles. She finds herself unable to cope with the double standards of her time.
- Abass (Shoukry Sarhan)
- Amina's aunt (Zouzou Nabil)
- Amina's aunt's husband (Hussein Riyad)
- Amina's cousin (Hassan Yusef)
- Amina's father (Mohammad Abd al Qudoos)
