= This Is Love (1958 film) =

- هذا هو الحب
- Directed by: Salah Abu Seif; Ahmed El-Sabawy (assistant director); Saleh Fawzy (assistant director)
- Written by: Muhammed Kamel Hassan al-Mohami
- Starring: Lobna Abdel Aziz; Yehia Chahine; Mary Mounib; Abdel Moneim Ibrahim; Omar El-Hariri; Hussein Riad
- Production company: Orient Films Distribution
- Release date: October 26, 1958
- Running time: 125 minutes
- Country: Egypt
- Language: Arabic

This Is Love (Arabic: هذا هو الحب transliterated as Hatha howa al’ob) is an Egyptian film released on October 22, 1958. The film is directed by Salah Abu Seif, features a screenplay written by Muhammed Kamel Hassan al-Mohami, and stars Lobna Abdel Aziz and Yehia Chahine.

== Plot ==
Hussein is a civil engineer in his town with an unusual mentality. He is conservative and committed to finding a virgin wife, and he sees Sharifa as a suitable prospect. He proposes and she agrees. However, ten days into the marriage, Hussein discovers his wife has a romantic past and sees her as a fallen woman, leading her to suffer greatly from the consequent divorce.

== Cast ==
- Lobna Abdel Aziz (Sharifa)
- Yehia Chahine (Hussein)
- Hussein Riad (Sharifa's father)
- Mahmoud Azmy (Fouad)
- Abdel Moneim Ibrahim (Tawfiq)
- Omar El-Hariri (Bahgat)
- Mary Mounib (Hussein's mother)
- Ferdoos Mohammed (Sharifa's mother)
- Soheir El-Barouni (Samiha)
- Salah Abdulhameed (spice miller in the poor neighborhood)
- Shafik Nour El Din (cabaret founder)
- Gamalat Zayed (Mrs. Zaha)
- Kamal Anwar
- Abdel Moneim Ismail (Ali, a gofer)
- Zein el-Ashmawy (Fouad's friend)
- Zeinat Olwi (dancer)
- Badr Nofal (hotel guest)
- Hussein Ismail (Zaki)
- Metawee Eweiss (furniture porter)
- Toson Moatamed (furniture porter)
- Abdelazim Kamel (company engineer)
