= Ragaa Al Geddawy =

Egyptian actress (1934–2020)

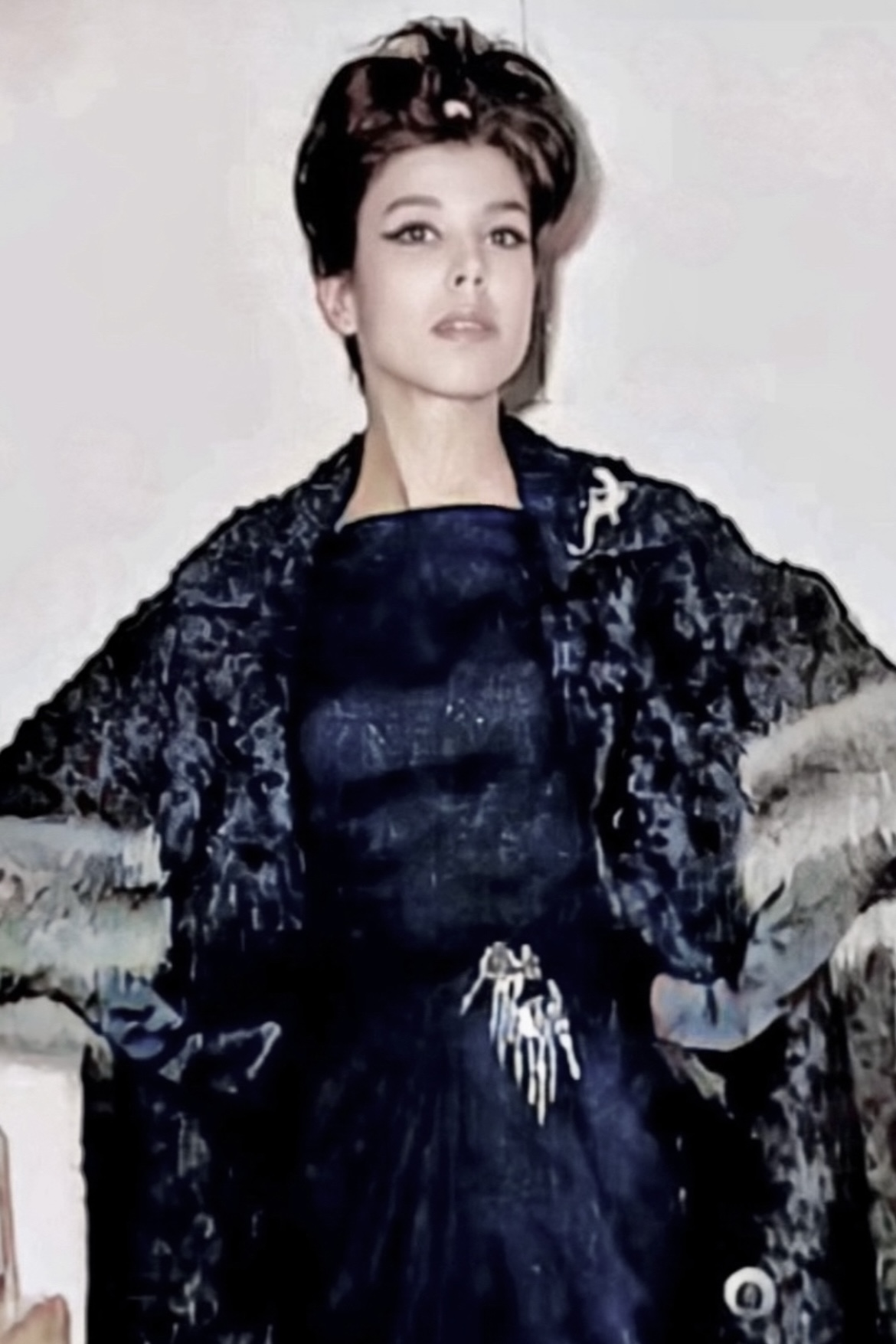
- Al Geddawy in the 1960s
- Born: Najat Ali Hossin Al Geddawy; 6 September 1934; Ismailia, Egypt
- Died: 5 July 2020 (aged 85); Ismailia, Egypt
- Occupations: Actress, model
- Years active: 1958–2020
- Spouse: Hassan Mokhtar (m. 1970; died 2016)
- Children: 1

Ragaa Al Geddawy (Arabic: رجاء الجداوي; 6 September 1934 – 5 July 2020) was an Egyptian actress and model. She was one of the most beloved actresses and one of the most prominent figures in the Middle East, with a fruitful six-decade career.

== Early life ==
Al Geddawy was born on 6 September 1934 (Note: Several other sources mistakenly reported that she was born in 1938.) in Ismailia. In her early years, after moving to the big city of Cairo, she lived with her aunt, bellydancer and actress Taheyya Kariokka.

She received her primary education at the Franciscan schools in Cairo, before working in the translation department of an advertising company. She then moved onto modelling, after she was crowned Miss Egypt in 1958.

== Career ==
Al Geddawy acted in Douaa Al-Kawrawan (The Nightingale's Prayer) in 1959. In 1960, she appeared in Ishaaet Hob (A Rumor of Love) alongside Omar Sharif and Soad Hosny. The film revolves around young and shy Hussein (Sharif) who falls in love with his cousin Samiha (Husni), who is too busy pining over her other cousin. Al Geddawy played Samiha's friend.

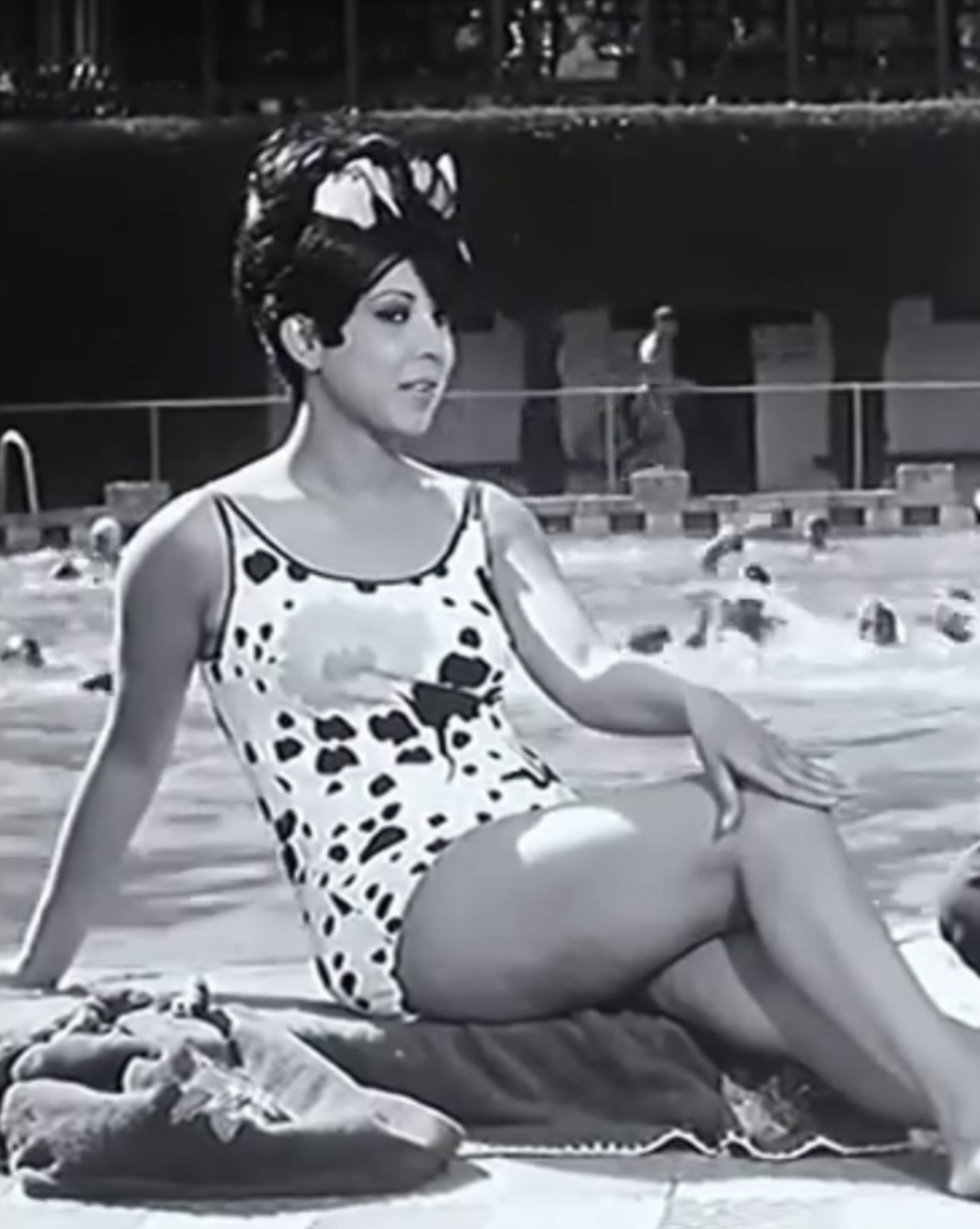
Al Geddawy in My Wife's Dignity (1967)

In 1962, she starred in the comedy drama Al Forsan Al Thalatha (The Three Musketeers). The film followed an honourable lawyer (Ismail Yassine) who wrote about his virtues in a magazine, before inheriting a nightclub and having his world turned upside down. Al Geddawy played his daughter, Huda, who is in love with her cousin Nabil (Mahmoud Azmy), but promised to Sheikh Fadel (Abdel Salam Al Nabulsy). In 1967, she appeared in Karamat Zawgaty (My Wife's Dignity) alongside superstars such as Salah Zulfikar and Shadia. The film revolves around Mahmoud (Zulfikar) who is a womanizer and spends all his time in relationships without thinking about marriage and tries to get close to Nadia (Shadia), who forces him at the end to marry her. Al Geddawy played Mahmoud's friend Suhair.

In early 1980s, Al Geddawy appeared on stage in Adab El Gawaz (Marriage Manners), and Naseeha Mokhlesa Lel Sayedat (An Honest Advise for Ladies), both plays with Salah Zulfikar in the leading role were shown on Cairo theatres. In 1987, she appeared in Al Beh Al Bawab (The Doorman) alongside superstars such as Ahmed Zaki, Safia El Emari and Fouad el-Mohandes. The film followed a man who worked as a doorman and hustled on the side as a broker. In 2006, Al Geddawy embodied Taheyya Kariokka's role in the Cinderella series, directed by Samir Seif.

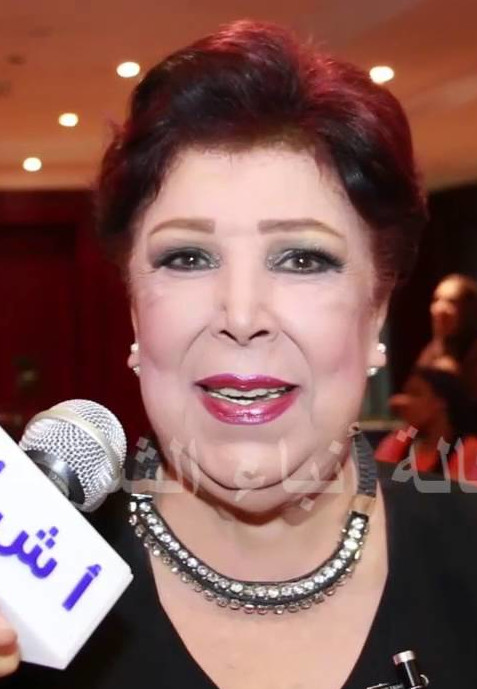
Al Geddawy in 2016

In the final phase of her career, she was more likely to be spotted in television series rather than films. One of her final major roles was Enayat in the successful Egyptian TV series Grand Hotel, which was released in 2016; it was an adaptation of a Spanish TV show, Gran Hotel, of the same name.

Her last acting role was in a TV series titled Lu'bat Al Nesyan (Forgetfulness Games) in 2020. She contracted the coronavirus (SARS-CoV-2) a few days after finishing the shooting.

== Personal life ==
Al Geddawy married Hassan Mokhtar, who was a goalkeeper with Ismaily SC, on 22 November 1970, with whom she had one daughter, Amira.

== Death ==
Al Geddawy died on July 5, 2020, at the age of 85, after being in medical isolation for 43 days and was put on an artificial respiration at the Abu Khalifa Hospital in Ismailia after contracting COVID-19 during the COVID-19 pandemic in Egypt.

Her body was released from medical isolation after the funeral prayer was held inside the hospital. It was conveyed in a metal sealed coffin in an ambulance to the family cemetery at Al-Basatin in Cairo.

== Tribute ==
Hollywood star Jean-Claude Van Damme paid tribute to Al Geddawy by sharing an image of the duo on Instagram, in which he mentioned that he met her a few months before her death.
