= Lobna Abdel Aziz =

Egyptian actress (born 1935)

Lobna Abdelaziz
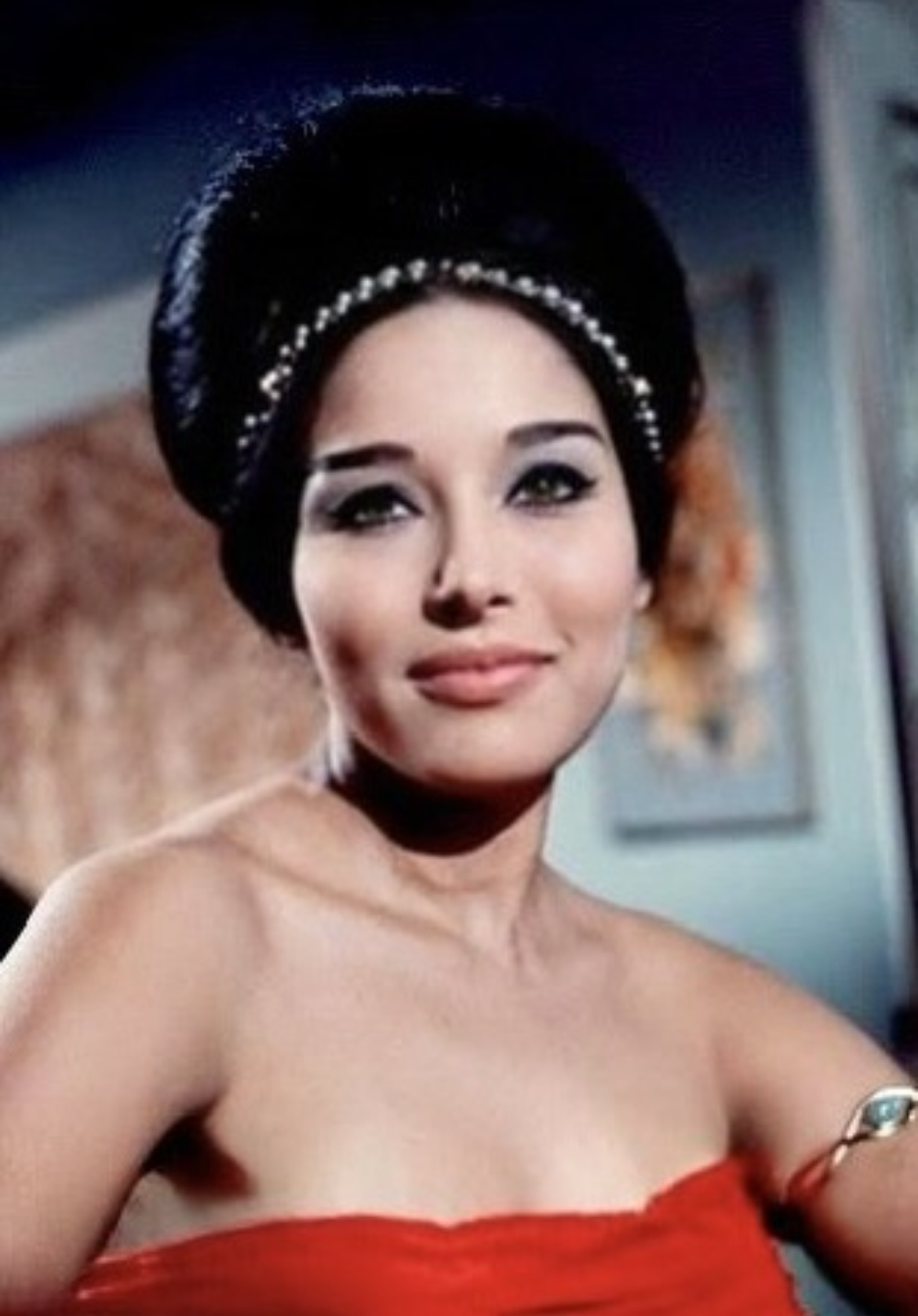
- Lobna Abdel Aziz in 1965
- Born: Lobna Abdelaziz; 1 August 1935 (age 91); Cairo, Egypt
- Occupations: Actress, writer for Ahram
- Years active: 1957–1967; 2007–present
- Spouses: Ramses Naguib; Ismail Beradah
- Children: 2
- Father: Hamed Abdelaziz

Lobna Abdel Aziz, aka Lobna Abdelaziz (Arabic: لبنى عبد العزيز; born 1 August 1935) is an Egyptian actress. She is regarded as an icon of Egypt’s Golden Age of cinema.

== Early life ==
She was born in Cairo, educated at St. Mary's School, and later completed her education at The American University in Cairo. She completed her master's degree in acting at the University of California in Los Angeles, United States.

== Career ==
Lobna Abdel Aziz began acting through the university's acting team, where she presented theatrical performances on the university's stage that drew the attention of theater critics to her acting talent, as happened when she presented the play The Three Sisters by Anton Chekhov.

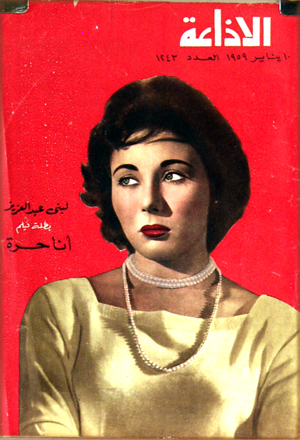
Lobna Abdel Aziz on the poster for I Am Free (1959)

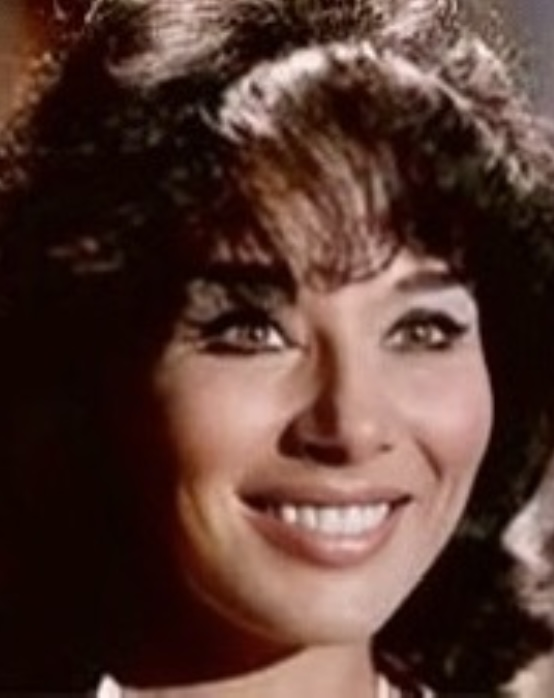
Lobna Abdel Aziz in Ah of Eve (1962)

Afterwards, film offers rained down on her, but she rejected them all for completing her studies at university, she obtained a scholarship to study at the University of California, which took her a while away from her passion for acting. She presented a radio European program for children called: Mama Lulu while she was 10 years old. Abdel Aziz was chosen by Salah Abu Seif to present the radio series The Empty Pillow. She began her professional career in a leading role opposite Abdel Halim Hafez in The Empty Pillow (1957), which she starred in radio before. During her cinematic career, Lobna Abdel Aziz starred in 18 films, the most notable of which are: The Empty Pillow (1957), This is Love (1958), I Am Free (1959), Oh Islam (1961), The Love of the Masters (1961), Oh from Eve (1962), Letter from an Unknown Woman (1962), Bride of the Nile (1963), Slalom (1965), The Beggar’s Strike (1967), The Vandals (1967), and The Defect (1967).

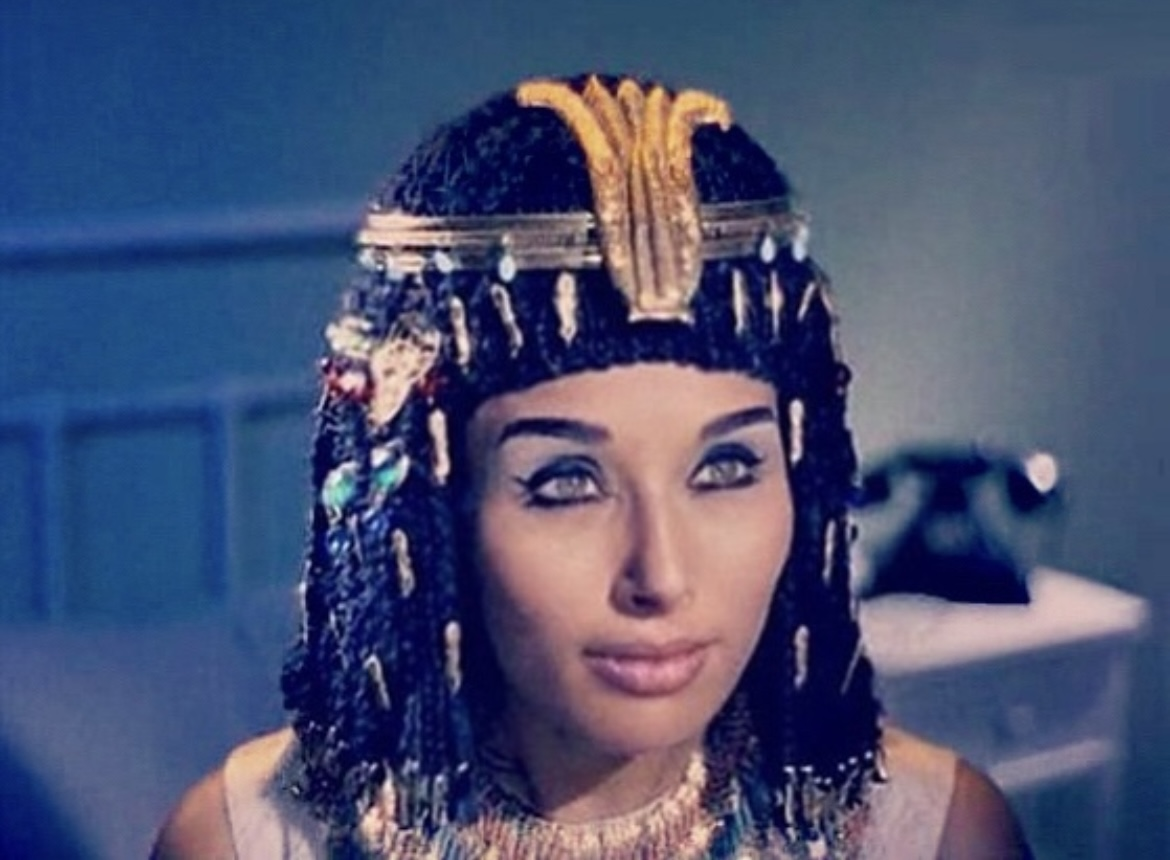
Lobna Abdel Aziz in Bride of the Nile (1963)

Despite her short career and her early retirement, all of her roles were leading roles. She retired from acting work in 1967 after a 10-year career. While in the United States, She got the scholarship of "Fulbright "and studied drama at the University of Washington. She used to write to El Ahram newspaper and she got her PhD. In 1988 she returned to Egypt and presented her old program that won the Radio Festival Award in episodes of St. in front of Roger Moore. After 40 years of retirement, she returned in 2007 for the miniseries The Yacoubian Building based on the novel of writer Alaa El Aswany under the same name.

Director Youssef Chahine, who was considered her closest friend, and despite that, she refused to participate with him in any film he directed, and the secret of that was her husband Ramses Naguib, and he told her that Chahine had no experience in directing, but he was only a good cinematographer. She tried to convince her husband to work with him, but he stubbornly refused until she separated from him, married again, and traveled to the United States for 30 years. After she returned in the year 2000, Youssef Chahine and Khaled Youssef came to her to convince her to star in one of the works and realize their common dream. She refused, which offended Youssef Chahine, who died estranged from her.

== Personal life ==
Her father was Egyptian author Hamed Abdelaziz. In her early life she was married outside Egypt to the famous rich Egyptian producer Ramses Naguib. He divorced her later in Egypt against her will and his will although they loved each other and were happy together. She read news of her divorce in a journal before she was divorced.

Ramses Naguib kept his Christian religion during his marriage to Abdelaziz by marrying her outside Egypt to overcome Egyptian law which enforces strict regulations on interfaith marriages. Afterward, she married Ismael Barrada with whom she had two daughters. Barrada died after more than 40 years of their marriage.

== Selected filmography ==
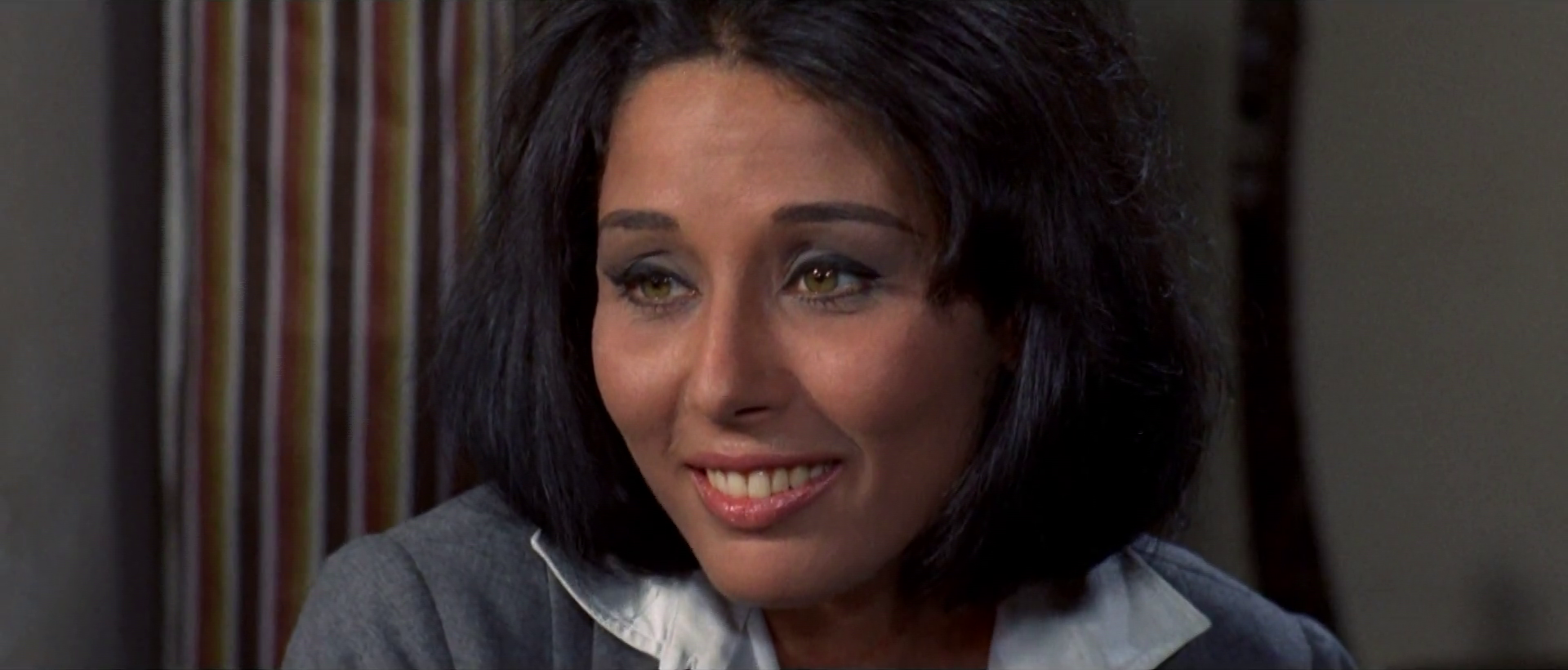
In Slalom (1965)

=== Film ===
- 2011: Geddo Habibi = Grandpa My Darling
- 1967: Edrab El Shahhatin = Strike Of Beggars
- 1967: El Mokharrebun = The Vandals
- 1967: El Eib = The Defect
- 1965: Slalom (Italian) = Zigzag
- 1963: Aroos El Nil = Bride of the Nile
- 1962: Ressalah min emraa maghoula= Letter from an Unknown Woman
- 1962: Ah Men hawwa = Ah of Eve
- 1961: Wa Islamah = Oh Islam
- 1961: Gharam El Asyad = Masters Love
- 1959: Ana Horra = I'm Free
- 1958: Hatha Huwa Al-Hubb = This Is Love
- 1957: Huda = Huda
- 1957: El Wesadah El Khaliyah = The Empty Pillow

=== Television ===
- 2007: Emaret Yakobyan (television series not movie)= Yakobyan Building

=== Theatre ===
- 2010: Sokkar Hanem (theatrical play not movie)=Lady Sugar

== See also ==
- Cinema of Egypt
- List of Egyptian films of the 1960s
- List of Egyptians
