= Mary Mounib =

Egyptian actress (1905–1969)

Mary Mounib (in Arabic ماري منيب), the stage name of Marie Sellim Habib Nasrallah (12 February 1905 – 21 January 1969), was an Egyptian actress of Syrian ethnic origins, known as the "funniest mother-in-law of Arab cinema".

== Life and career ==
Mounib was born in Damascus in 1905 but lived nearly all her life in Egypt. After her father's death, she made her debut in the theater, together with her sister, and her comic talent was immediately noticed. In 1937, she joined Naguib el-Rihani's troupe, leading them to success in both theater and film. She acted in hundreds of roles on stage and in nearly 200 films. She married several times, the first of which was to Egyptian comedian Fawzi Muneeb (1898 - 1947).

== Selected filmography ==
- Nashid al-Amal (1937)
- The Will (El azima) (1939)
- Intisar al-Shabab (1941)
- Layla, Daughter of the Poor(1942)
- Aydah (1942)
- The Lady's Puppet (Libat El Sitt) (1946)
- Papa Amin (1950)
- My Mother-in-Law is an Atomic Bomb (Hamati kombola zorria) (1951
- Hamido (1953)
- This is Love (1958)
- Umm-Ratibah (1959)
- Girls from the Sea (Banat Bahari) (1961)
- Letter from an Unknown Woman (1962)
- Thieves, but Funny (Losos Laken Dhurafa'a) (1968)
