= Ramses Naguib =

Egyptian film producer (1921–1977)

- Born: 8 June 1921
- Died: 4 February 1977 (aged 55)
- Occupations: Film producer and director
- Notable work: Three Women; The Splendor of Love; My Wife's Dignity; Bride of the Nile; Letter from an Unknown Woman; I Am the Fugitive; Oh Islam; Huda; Ismail Yassine in the Navy; The Leech; Pity My Tears; The Angel of Mercy; Ibn El-Balad
- Spouse: Lobna Abdel Aziz

Ramses Naguib or Ramsis Nagib (Arabic: رمسيس نجيب; 8 June 1921 – 4 February 1977) was an Egyptian film producer, actor and director.

He began his artistic career as an assistant director, then worked as a production manager for Aziza Amir Company, Nahas Studio, and the International Production Company.

He married famous charming actress Lobna Abdel Aziz, and changed his Christian religion to Islam according to Lobna Abdel Aziz interview. He married her, he then divorced her against her will and against his will. They were loving each other and living happy life together before divorce. Lobna read about her divorce in a journal before she was divorced.

== Filmography ==
- 1974: The Bullet is Still in My Pocket - Producer
- 1968: Three Women - Producer
- 1968: The Splendor of Love - Producer
- 1967: My Wife's Dignity - Producer
- 1963: Bride of the Nile - Producer
- 1962: Letter from an Unknown Woman - Distributor
- 1962: I Am the Fugitive - Distributor
- 1961: Oh Islam - Co-producer
- 1959: Huda - Director
- 1957: Ismail Yassine in the Navy - Co-producer
- 1956: The Leech - Co-producer
- 1954: Pity My Tears - Co-producer
- 1946: The Angel of Mercy - Co-producer
- 1942: Ibn El-Balad - Actor
