= Samara (1956 film) =

- Arabic: سمارة
- Directed by: Hasan El-Saifi
- Starring: Taheyya Kariokka, Mahmoud Ismail, Muhsen Sarhan, Mahmoud Al Meleji, Mohamed El Sebai
- Color process: black and white
- Release date: March 8, 1956 (Egypt)
- Country: Egypt
- Language: Arabic

Samara (Arabic: سمارة) also known as Samarah, is a 1956 Egyptian musical action drama film, by director Hasan El-Saifi. Starring in the film are Taheyya Kariokka, Mahmoud Ismail, Muhsen Sarhan, Mohamed El Sebai, and Mahmoud Al Meleji.

The plot of the film is about love and crime. A drug smuggler named Sultan (Mahmoud Ismail) fulls in love with a dancer named Samarah (Taheyya Kariokka), and she has no family. He marries her and she starts to work with him and his gang in the drug trade. One of the people in the gang is arrested by the police, causing a disruption for the remaining gang members.

It is one of the films listed on the Bibliotheca Alexandrina's 100 Greatest Egyptian Films (2006).
