= Last Plane to Baalbek =

- Directed by: Marcello Giannini; Hugo Fregonese
- Produced by: Enrico Bomba
- Cinematography: Alfio Contini; Aldo Giordani
- Music by: Marcello De Martino; Teo Usuelli
- Release date: June 1964 (Italy)

Last Plane to Baalbek (also known as Operation Baalbeck) is a 1964 Eurospy film directed by Marcello Giannini and Hugo Fregonese. It is a coproduction between Italy (where the film is known as F.B.I. operazione Baalbeck or La moneta spezzata), France (where it was released as Dernier avion pour Baalbeck) and Lebanon.

== Cast ==
- Rossana Podestà as Isabel Moore
- Jacques Sernas as Nicholas 'Nick' Mann
- George Sanders as Prince Makowski
- Folco Lulli as John Volpi
- Leopoldo Trieste as Pagani
- Yoko Tani as Asia
- Miranda Martino as the Singer
