= My Wife's Dignity =

1967 film

- Directed by: Fatin Abdel Wahab
- Written by: Ihsan Abdel Quddous
- Screenplay by: Mohammed Mostafa Samy
- Produced by: Ramses Naguib
- Starring: Salah Zulfikar; Shadia
- Cinematography: Abdel Halim Nasr
- Edited by: Hussein Afify
- Music by: Fouad El Zahery
- Production company: Ramses Naguib
- Distributed by: Cairo Cinema Distribution Corporation
- Release date: 18 September 1967
- Country: Egypt
- Language: Egyptian Arabic

My Wife's Dignity (Egyptian Arabic: كرامة زوجتي translit: Karamet Zawgati or Karamat Zawjati) is a 1967 Egyptian film written by Ihsan Abdel Quddous and directed by Fatin Abdel Wahab. It stars Salah Zulfikar and Shadia. The film was produced by Ramses Naguib for Ramses Naguib Films and was released on September 18, 1967 by Cairo Cinema Distribution Corporation.

== Plot ==
Mahmoud is a womanizer. He spends all his time in relationships without thinking about marriage and tries to get close to Nadia, his club partner for five years, but she repels him, forcing him to ask for marriage and stipulates that before agreeing that if he betrays her, she will betray him in the same way. Mahmoud agrees and marries her, and she succeeds in turning him into another successful person in his working life.

After months of marriage, the wife suspects her husband's actions, then discovers his betrayal with one of his clients, and begins to act with him in a way that suggests that she is cheating on him, which makes him live in torment and pain, and when the suspicion increases, he divorces her and leaves Cairo to forget his pain, and when he returns to his office, he is surprised by the agent of the office, and he presents him with a file, and he sees the documents that confirm that his wife did not cheat on him and knows that everything that happened was just an act, he decides to return to his wife after she had taught him an unforgettable lesson.

== Cast ==
- Salah Zulfikar as Mahmoud Mokhtar
- Shadia as Nadia
- Ragaa Al-Geddawy as Suhair
- George Sidhom as Samida Abdel Samad
- Adel Emam as Amin
- Sharifa Maher as Salwa
- Zeinat Olwi as Dancer
- Mahmoud Rashad as Nadia's uncle
- Thoraya Helmy as Dancer
