= Enrico Bomba =

Italian film producer and director (1922–1995)

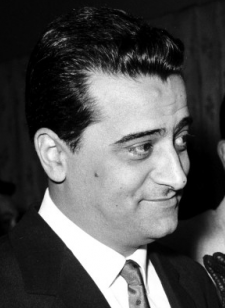
Bomba in 1962

Enrico Bomba (2 August 1922 – 1 November 1995) was an Italian film producer, director, and screenwriter. He also worked in television. He was born in Rome.

== Career ==
Bomba worked in various capacities from 1949 onward. In 1952, he directed his first film, Prigionieri delle tenebre (Prisoners of Darkness); and in the following year he commenced a film called Jezebel, although it was never completed.

In the 1960s and 1970s, he worked steadily as a director and screenwriter, directing two films featuring Agent 777 (under the name Henry Bay) and two decamerotici (films inspired by The Decameron). In 1975, he dedicated himself to dubbing foreign language films, working as director and dialogist. Among the voiceovers that he edited the Japanese anime TV series, Great Mazinger and two works taken from the French novel Sans Famille: the anime TV series Nobody's Boy: Remi, and the French television miniseries Sans Famille. During the late 1970s, he made three more films for Cinestampa Internazionale which involved the work of anime artist Gō Nagai. He retired in the early 1990s.

== Personal life and death ==
Enrico Bomba was born in Amatrice on 2 August 1922. He married Giannina Gianni in 1946. Together they had two children, Ernesto (born 1948) and Maria Elisabetta "Camilla" (born 1951). At this time he was the brother-in-law of Tito Marconi, the president of Luce Fattorosi in Cinecittà.

Bomba had an affair with Jayne Mansfield in Italy in 1962, while she was married to Mickey Hargitay. Subsequently, he married voice actress Germana Dominici. They had a daughter, Federica Bomba. His father-in-law was film and voice actor Arturo Dominici.

Enrico Bomba died on 1 November 1995, at the age of 73. Dominici died on 3 January 2024, at the age of 77.

== Filmography ==
=== As director ===
- Prisoners of Darkness (1952)
- Love and Faith/Oh Islam (1961, also producer)
- Secret Agent 777 (1965, as Henry Bay)
- Agente segreto 777 - Invito ad uccidere (1966, as Henry Bay)
- Aretino's Blue Stories (1972, decamerotici)
- Le mille e una notte... e un'altra ancora! (A thousand and one nights ... and yet another!) (1973, decamerotici)

=== As producer ===
- Love and Poison (1952)
- Sul ponte dei sospiri (1953)
- Oh Islam/Love and Faith (1961, also director)
- Il ratto delle sabine (Romulus and the Sabines, 1961)
- No Man's Land(1962, starred Roger Moore)
- Scarlet Eye/The Dead Eye of Ceylon (1963, starred Lex Barker)
- Last Plane to Baalbek (1964, starred Rossana Podestà)
