= Hasan El-Saifi =

Egyptian film director, producer, writer (1927–2005)

- حسن الصيفي
- Born: January 13, 1927; Cairo, Kingdom of Egypt
- Died: March 25, 2005 (aged 78); Cairo, Egypt
- Other names: Hassan Al-Saifi, Hassan al-Saifi, Hasan el-Saifi, Hasan El Saifi, Hassan El-Seify, Hassan El Seifi
- Occupation(s): Film director, film producer, screenplay writer
- Years active: 1946–1995
- Spouse(s): Katie (Egyptian actress) (divorced), Zahret El-Ola
- Children: 2

Hasan El-Saifi (Arabic: حسن الصيفي, romanized: Ḥasan Ṣayfī; 1927–2005) was an Egyptian film director, film producer, and screenplay writer. He worked on nearly 150 Egyptian films. He has various name spellings in English due to transliteration, most commonly Hassan el-Saifi, Hassan El-Seify, and Hassan al-Saifi.

== Biography ==
Hasan El-Saifi was born on January 13, 1927, in Cairo, Kingdom of Egypt.

El-Saifi started his career in film in 1946, by working as an assistant director under Helmy Rafla, and Anwar Wagdi. By 1952, El-Saifi was able to establish his own film production company. His first directed film was named, Bear Witness, People (released 20 April 1953 in Egypt). His most notable film he directed was Samara (1956), starring Taheyya Kariokka and Mohsen Sarhan.

In the 1970s, he moved to Lebanon (an area later known as Syria) for a few years, where he directed several films.

He died on March 25, 2005, in Cairo, after suffering from a heart attack.

== Personal life and family ==
In the 1950s he was married to Egyptian-born Greek actress and dancer Katie (Egyptian actress) (sometimes known as Katie Voutsakis, Kitty or Keti), which ended in divorce. He later married Egyptian actress Zahret El-Ola, a second marriage for both of them. Together with Zahret El-Ola they had two children, their daughter Manal El-Saifi is a film director. Both of his wives starred in his films.

== Filmography ==
- Bear Witness, People (1953; Arabic: اشهدوا يا ناس), as director
- Lady Pickpocket (1953; Arabic: نشالة هانم, romanized: Nachala Hanem), as director
- Injustice Is Forbidden (1954; Arabic: الظلم حرام, romanized: El Zolm Haram), as director, and screenplay writer
- Samara (1956; Arabic: سمارة), as director
- Zannuba (1956; Arabic: زنوبة), as director
- Touha (1958 film) (Arabic: توحة), as director
- The Poor Millionaire (1959; Arabic: المليونير الفقير, romanized: Al-Milyunayr Al-Faqir), as director
- Ismail Yassine in Prison (1961; Arabic: Ismail Yassine Fi El Segn), as director
- The Judge of Love (1962), as director
- The Comic Society for Killing Wives (1962; Arabic: جمعية قتل الزوجات الهزلية, romanized: Gamaeyat Qatl el-Zawgaat el-Hazleya), as director
- The Black Suitcase (1962; Arabic: الحقيبة السوداء, romanized: Al Hakiba Al Souda), as director
- King of Petroleum (1962; Arabic: ملك البترول, romanized: Malik El Petrol), as director
- Fugitive from Marriage (1964; Arabic: هارب من الزواج, romanized: Hareb mn El Zawag)
- The Girl from the Neighborhood (1964) (Arabic: بنت الحتة, romanized: Bint el hetta), as director
- The Two Friends (1970; Arabic: الصديقان), as director, and screenplay writer
- Forbidden on Wedding Night (1974; Arabic: ممنوع في ليلة الدخلة, romanized: Mamnou Fi Laylat El-Dokhla)
- Hadi Badi (1984; Arabic: حادي بادي), as director
- Love and Fate (1995; Arabic: الحب نصيب), as director
