= Ahmed Badrakhan =

Egyptian film director and screenwriter

- Born: 18 September 1909; Egypt
- Died: 26 August 1969 (aged 59); Egypt
- Occupations: Film director, screenwriter
- Years active: 1936–1968
- Known for: A Night of Love
- Spouse: Asmahan (div.)
- Children: Ali Badrakhan

Ahmed Badrakhan (18 September 1909 – 26 August 1969) was an Egyptian film director and screenwriter of Iraqi Kurdish origin. He directed 41 films between 1936 and 1968. He is famous for his 1952 romantic drama A Night of Love starring Mahmoud El Meliguy and Mariam Fakhr Eddine. He directed Intisar al-chabab (1941) which for the first time starred the virtuoso oud player and singer Farid al-Atrash along with singer Asmahan. He was married to Asmahan, and would be a central figure in Studio Misr, Egypts most popular cinema studio at the time.

== Selected filmography ==
- Dananeer (1940)
- Intisar Al Shabab (1941)
- Aydah (1942)
- Fatma (1947)
- El kahira-Baghdad (1947)
- Ana Wa inta (1950)
- A Night of Love (1951)
- Lahn hubi (1954)
- Alashan eyounik (1955)
- Allah maana (1955)
- Izhay ansak (1956)
