= Alwiya Gamil =

Egyptian actress

- Born: 15 December 1910; Lebanon
- Died: 16 August 1994 (aged 83); Egypt
- Occupation: Actress
- Spouse: Mahmoud el-Meliguy (m. 1939–1983)
- Children: 3

Alwiya Gamil (Arabic: علوية جميل) was an Egyptian actress of Lebanese origin whose real name was Elisabeth Khalil Majdalani. She was born in Lebanon on December 15, 1910 and immigrated with her parents to Egypt.

== Career ==
Gamil began her career at the age of 15 when she joined Youssef Wahbi's performing group Ramesses in 1925. It is believed that Wahbi gave her the stage name. Gamil is known for her notable roles in Zainab (1930), Victory of Youth (1941), Berlanti (1944). She also appeared in No Agreement (1961) The Cursed Palace (1962) and A Wife From Paris (1996). She retired in 1967.

== Personal life ==
Gamil married twice. Her second marriage was in 1939 to the Egyptian actor, Mahmoud el-Meliguy. They did not have children but raised her three children from her first marriage together. Gamil died on August 16, 1994.

== See also ==
- Lists of Egyptians
