= Summer Skin (film) =

1961 film

- Directed by: Leopoldo Torre Nilsson
- Written by: Beatriz Guido; Leopoldo Torre Nilsso
- Produced by: Leopoldo Torre Nilsson
- Starring: Alfredo Alcón
- Cinematography: Oscar Melli
- Edited by: Jacinto Cascales
- Release date: 31 August 1961
- Running time: 96 minutes
- Country: Argentina
- Language: Spanish

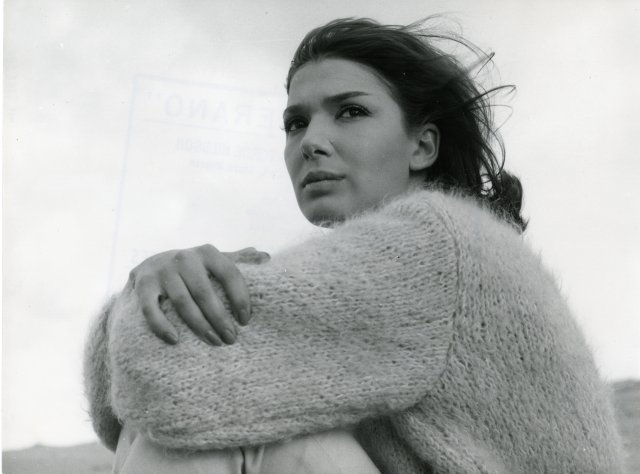
Graciela Borges in Summer Skin

Summer Skin (Spanish: Piel de verano) is a 1961 Argentine film directed by Leopoldo Torre Nilsson. The film was selected as the Argentine entry for the Best Foreign Language Film at the 34th Academy Awards, but was not accepted as a nominee.

== Cast ==
- Alfredo Alcón as Martín
- Graciela Borges as Marcela
- Franca Boni as Jou-Jou
- Pedro Laxalt as Alberto
- Juan Jones as Marcos
- Luciana Possamay as Adela

== See also ==
- List of submissions to the 34th Academy Awards for Best Foreign Language Film
- List of Argentine submissions for the Academy Award for Best Foreign Language Film
