= Stephan Rosti =

Egyptian actor

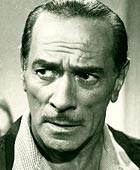
- Born: 16 November 1891; Italy or Egypt (unconfirmed)
- Died: 22 May 1964 (aged 72); Cairo, Egypt
- Occupations: Actor, film director
- Years active: 1926-1964

Stephan Rosti (Arabic: استفان روستى [(ʔ)esteˈfæːn ˈɾosti]) (16 November 1891 – 22 May 1964) was an Egyptian actor and film director who lived and worked in Egypt.

== Personal ==
Rosti's mother was an Italian Egyptian dancer. She was performing in Egypt when she met Rosti's father, the Austrian ambassador to Cairo. Rosti's mother was enamoured with Egypt to the point that when it was time for the diplomat father to terminate his political assignment (in Cairo) and return to his country, she refused to travel with him and decided to remain in Egypt with her son. To escape the father's attempts to smuggle the child out of Egypt, she escaped with the child to Alexandria and they lived in the Ras al-Tin neighborhood where Stephan enrolled in its local schools.

As a young man, Rosti travelled to Austria seeking recognition by his father, but to no avail. As he danced and worked odd jobs in Austria, Germany, and France. Rosti met and befriended two visiting Egyptian film-makers, Mohammed Karim and Sirag Mounir, who encouraged him to return to Egypt to work in cinema, given his fluency in Arabic and after he expressed his desire to do so. Rosti returned to Egypt and enrolled as a student in the "Acting Institute" of Cairo, and accepted his first role as director of the first wholly Egyptian feature film, "Layla" from producer Aziza Amir in 1927.

Rosti appeared in 24 Egyptian films between 1927 and 1964. He also directed seven Egyptian films between 1931 and 1946. He was renowned for portraying evil characters with a satirical inclination, and he became an icon of the Egyptian film industry.

== Filmography ==
=== Director ===
- The Song of the Heart (1932) (Director)

=== Actor ===
- Nashid al-Amal (1937)
- Sallama (1945)
