= Fouad Shafiq =

Egyptian actor

- Born: Mohamed Fouad Shafiq; 13 October 1899; Cairo, Khedivate of Egypt
- Died: 2 September 1964 (aged 64)
- Occupation: Actor

Mohamed Fouad Shafiq, more commonly known by his stage name Fouad Shafiq or Fouad Shafik (1899–1964) was an Egyptian actor.

== Early life ==
Shafiq was born "Mohamed Fouad Shafiq" on 13 October 1899, in a humble area in El Gamalia district in Cairo, Egypt. His brother was the renowned actor Hussein Riad. After his father's death, Shafiq left his high school and moved to Sudan where he worked and also married.

== Acting career ==
Upon returning to Egypt in 1924, Shafiq met Youssef Wahbi and began his career in acting through the film "Anthem of Hope". Thereafter, he also worked in many plays in the Fatima Rushdi Ensemble. His performances varied between comedy and tragedy, in films such as Nashid al-Amal (1937), Dananeer (1940), Berlanti (1944), and Sallama (1945).

== Death ==
He died on 2 September 1964.
