= Farid al-Atrash =

Syrian-Egyptian singer, composer and musician (1910–1974)

Farid Al-Atrash فريد الأطرش
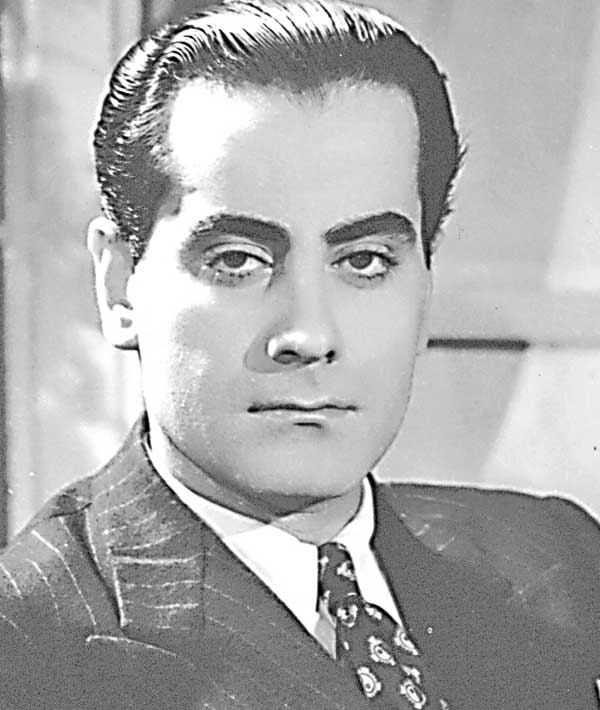

Background information
- Born: Farid Fahd Farḥan Ismail Al-Aṭrash; October 19, 1915; Al-Qurayya, Ottoman Syria, Ottoman Empire
- Origin: As-Suwayda, Syria
- Died: December 26, 1974 (aged 64) Beirut, Lebanon
- Genres: Arabic, Egyptian classical, instrumental
- Occupations: Singer, actor, composer, instrumentalist
- Instruments: Vocals, oud
- Years active: 1930s–1974

Farid al-Atrash (Arabic: فريد الأطرش; October 19, 1915 – December 26, 1974), also spelled Farid El-Atrache, was a Syrian-Egyptian singer, oudist, composer, and actor. Although born in Syria, he immigrated to Egypt at the age of nine with his mother and siblings, where he eventually became one of the most noted figures in 20th-century Arabic music.

Al-Atrash embarked on a highly successful career spanning more than four decades, recording 500 songs and starring in 31 movies. He is also widely regarded for his virtuosity on the Arabic oud, and has sometimes been given the epithet "King of the Oud" (Malek al-Oud).

== Early life ==
Al-Atrash was born in 1915, in Al-Qurayya, in southern Syria to the Druze princely al-Atrash family who fought the French colonial army. His father was Syrian and his mother was Lebanese.

As a young child, al-Atrash emigrated with his mother and siblings to Egypt, escaping the French occupation. Later, they were naturalized by the Egyptian government as citizens. Farid's mother sang and played the Oud, which spurred his musical interest at an early age.

As a child and young adult, al-Atrash sang within school events. He studied at Egypt's music conservatory and became an apprentice of the famous Egyptian composer Riad Al Sunbati. In the 1930s, al-Atrash began his professional singing career by working for privately owned Egyptian radio stations. Eventually, he was hired as an oud player for the national radio station and later as a singer. His sister, Asmahan, was also a talented singer, and for a while they worked together. In 1941, they starred in their first successful movie Intisar a l-Shabab (انتصار الشباب – The Triumph of Youth, 1941), in which Farid himself composed all the music.

== Family ==
Camilla Al Atrash, the only daughter of Asmahan, with her uncle Farid

Farid and his sister Amal, along with their brother Fouad, belonged to the religious minority Druze clan of their parents, Princess Alia and Prince Fahd al-Atrash. (Asmar 1998) His sister, Asmahan, evidenced similar musical talent in her teens, becoming one of the most popular female vocalists and cinema stars in the late 1930s and early 1940s. Farid is better known than Asmahan because her career was interrupted by her death in an accident in 1944. Yet he was initially overshadowed by his sister's talent and popularity. With maturity and the forging of a successful performance formula, Farid became famous in his own right. Even today, the reference to the given name "Farid" in the context of Arabic music or popular culture is immediately understood to denote al-Atrash himself.

== Musical career ==
Al-Atrash had a long and colorful music career lasting four decades. He composed musically diverse songs, and was a highly regarded composer, singer and instrumentalist. Al-Atrash maintained that although some of his music had western musical influence, he always stayed true to Arab music principles. Although the majority of his compositions were romantic love songs, he also composed several patriotic and religious songs.

One of al-Atrash's most unusual and distinguishable traits was his voice. High and mellow at the start of his career, it evolved into a wider, deeper sound.

In many of his songs, and nearly all of his concerts, al-Atrash would sing a mawal, which is a local folk Egyptian slow voice improvisation of a few poetic lines. These improvisations sometimes lasted up to 15 minutes. The mawal was a favorite of his fans. Some of the most famous songs include "Rabeeh" (Spring), "Awal Hamsa" (first whisper), "Hekayat Gharami" (story of my love), "Albi Wa Mouftaho" (my heart and its key), "Gamil Gamal", "Wayak", "Ya Zahratan Fi Khayali" (يا زهرة في خيالي – "Flower of my imagination), "Bisat Ir Rih" (flying carpet), "Ya Gamil Ya Gamil", "Ya Habaybi Ya Ghaybeen", "Eish Anta", and "sa3a bi 2orb el habib" (an hour in company of the beloved).

== Film career ==
Al-Atrash starred in 31 Egyptian musical films from 1941 to 1974. His last movie, Nagham Fi Hayati (نغم في حياتي, Songs in my life) was released after his death. All his films except the last two were black and white. They ranged from comedies to dramas, or a combination. He composed all the songs in his movies including the songs sung by other singers, and instrumentals (usually belly dance routines). His earlier films would include approximately ten songs, but overall the films would average about five songs each. Some of al-Atrash's well-known movies include Intisar al-Shabab (انتصار الشباب – The Triumph of Youth, 1941), Yom Bila Ghad, Ahd el-Hawa, and Lahn al-Kholoud (لحن الخلود – "Eternal Tune", 1952), Resala min Imraa Maghoola (رسالة من امرأة مجهولة – Letter from an Unknown Woman, 1962) produced by Salah Zulfikar Films owned by his close friend Salah Zulfikar and directed by Salah Abu Seif. (حب الأيام-love of the days)

== Personal life ==
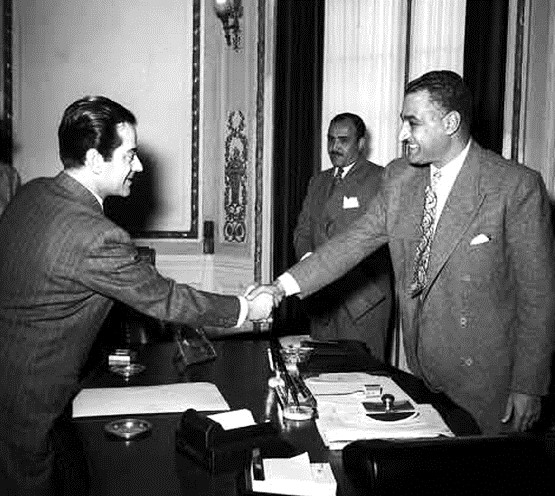
Al-Atrash shaking hands with Egyptian president Gamal Abdel Nasser, February 1955

He endured the death of his sister and fellow performer Asmahan. Farid found comfort in a relationship with the belly-dancer Samia Gamal, for whom he was motivated to risk all he owned. In 1947 he produced and co-starred in a movie with Samia directed by Henri Barakat; Habib al-'Oumr ("The love of my life," 1947), which became a huge success. After this came Afrita Hanem ("Madame la diablesse," 1949). Five films later, the unmarried couple broke up. Farid continued to work with other film stars in numerous successful movies in which he always had the romantic lead role of a sad singer. He even repeatedly chose his character's name to be "Wahid," meaning lonely.

Al-Atrash sacrificed getting married for his devotion to his art. In his films, the audience remembered his leading ladies and his beautiful songs more than the story lines.

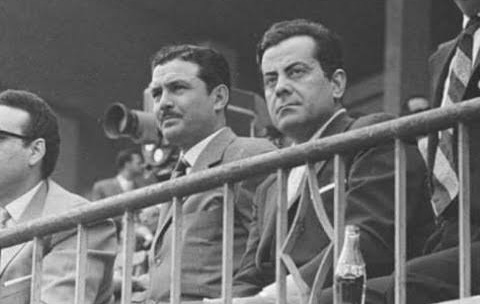
Al-Atrash and Salah Zulfikar during a sports event in Cairo, 1961

Prior to the 1952 military coup d'état against King Farouk I, al-Atrash became friends with Farouk's consort, Queen Nariman, a relationship that continued after the Queen's divorce and the coup that cost Farouk his throne. The former queen's family did not accept al-Atrash, and the separation from Nariman sent the singer into a long depression, the start of health problems that worsened from that point on until his death.

As al-Atrash became older, he reconsidered his opinion of marriage and proposed to Egyptian singer named Shadia, but at the last minute he backed out. By now his health was poor, and he feared that he would leave her a young widow. He often played out that scenario and sang about it in his romance movies. He was also engaged to marry Salwa al-Qudsi at the end of his life.

Others stated: "He remained a bachelor throughout his life" Another Moroccan-born singer Maya Casabianca called him the "love of her life" (though they didn't marry). He characterized himself in a fairly idealized version of a modern artist. "Tales of his love affairs were wildly popular during his lifetime and were seemingly merged with the lyrics of his love songs." (Zuhur in Ouzgane 2003)

== Death ==
Al-Atrash, suffered from heart problems throughout his last 30 years. In the last few years of his life, he became physically thinner, and his singing voice became raspy as he is intensified. Although he was struggling with his health, he continued to produce movies and perform in concerts until he died.

On December 24, 1974 the doctors told al-Atrash that after two days he could go home. This was because they noticed that Farid did not like the hospital, or the drugs and the food that the hospital provided for him. On December 26, 1974, al-Atrash died in Beirut, Lebanon at Al Hayek hospital, shortly after arriving from London. Al-Atrash is buried in Cairo, Egypt alongside his sister and brother.

== Legacy ==
He composed songs for top Arab singers, foremost his own sister, Asmahan, as well as Wadih El-Safi, Shadia, Warda, and Sabah. He is widely considered to be one of the four 'greats' of Egyptian and Arabic music, along with Abdel Halim Hafez, Mohammed Abdel Wahab and Oum Kalthoum. Notable Egyptian instrumental guitarist Omar Khorshid covered Farid al-Atrash's songs in a tribute album.

His musical pieces was produced by Voice of Lebanon label which was founded by Robert Khayatt. the entire catalogue was acquired by Mazzika Group in the early 2000s.

One of his songs, "Hebbina Hebbina" from "Nagham fi Hayati", has been heard on the radio station (Radio Del Mundo) in 2005 video game Grand Theft Auto: Liberty City Stories.

On October 19, 2020, Google celebrated his 110th birthday with a Google Doodle.

== Filmography ==
- Intisar al-Shabab (1941)
- Ahlam el chabab (1943)
- Shahr el asal (1946)
- Ma akdarshi (1946)
- Gamal wa Dalal (1946)
- Bolbol effendi (1946)
- Habib al omr (1947)
- Ahebbak inta (1949)
- Afrita hanem (1949)
- Akher kedba (1950)
- Taa la salim (1951)
- Ma takulshi la hada (1952)
- Lahn al khouloud (1952)
- Ayza atgawwez (1952)
- Lahn hubi (1954)
- Risalat Gharam (1954)
- Ahdil Hawa (1955)
- Oussit Hobi (1955)
- Izhay ansak (1956)
- Wadda'tu hubbak (1957)
- Inta habibi (1957)
- Maleesh Gheirak (1958)
- Min agl Hobbi (1960)
- Shatie el hub (1961)
- Yomun bala ghaden (1962)
- Ressalah min emraa maghoula (1962)
- Hikayet el omr kulluh (1965)
- El-Khouroug min el-guana (1967)
- Al-Hob al-kabir (1969)
- Zaman Ya Hob (1973)
- Nagham fi Hayati (1974)

== See also ==
- List of Druze
