= The Water-Carrier Is Dead =

- السقا مات
- Directed by: Salah Abu Seif
- Written by: Yusuf Sibai (story); Mohsen Zayed (screenplay and dialogue)
- Produced by: Youssef Chahine
- Starring: Ezzat El Alaili; Farid Shawqi; Shwikar; Amina Rizk; Taheyya Kariokka; Nahid Jabr
- Cinematography: Mahmoud Sabo
- Edited by: Rachida Abdel Salam
- Music by: Fouad el-Zahery
- Production company: Misr International Films
- Release date: November 20, 1977
- Running time: 103 minutes
- Countries: Egypt; Tunisia
- Language: Arabic

The Water-Carrier Is Dead (Arabic: السقا مات, transliterated as Al-saqqa mat) is an Egyptian-Tunisian film released on November 20, 1977. The film was directed by Salah Abu Seif and produced by Youssef Chahine. Its screenplay, written by Mohsen Zayed, is based on a 1952 novel by Yusuf Sibai. The Water-Carrier Is Dead stars Ezzat El Alaili, Farid Shawqi, Shwikar, Amina Rizk, Taheyya Kariokka, and Nahid Jabr.

The film won the award for the Best Egyptian film of the year in 1977. It was later listed at the Dubai film festival among the best 100 Arab films of all time.

== Plot ==
In the Cairo neighborhood around Al-Hussein Mosque (called Husseiniyah) around 1921, Shusha, a water-carrier, is very afraid of death since he has lost all his loved ones to it. He tries to foster a close relationship between his surviving son and a woman named Amna, who reminds Shusha of his late wife. He has also always dreamt of becoming the director of the pumping station and tries to get his son to succeed at this where he failed. Shusha meets and befriends Shehata Effendi, who he learns is a teaching assistant, but Shehata too dies, and Shusha has a nervous breakdown while helping bury the man.

== Cast ==
- Farid Shawqi (Shehata Effendi, a teaching assistant)
- Ezzat El Alaili (Shusha, the watercarrier)
- Shwikar (Aziza Nofal)
- Amina Rizk (Amna’s mother)
- Taheyya Kariokka (Professor Zamzam)
- Nahid Jabr (Amna)
- Sharif Salah El-Din (Sayed, a boy)
- Hassan Hussein (Sheikh Syed)
- Ibrahim Kadri (pharmacist)
- Mohamed Farid (Jad)
- Mohamed Abo Hashish (Ibrahim Khosht, a welder)
- Belqis (Zakia bint al-Muallem)
- Aziza Mohammed
- Abdulaziz Issa (water company employee)
- Sabry Rasian
- Muhammad Naeem
- Ibrahim Zago (Dongle)
- Ali al-Ma’awon (Sharaf al-Dabbah)
- Naim Issa (other teaching assistant)
- Michel Gaballah (Fathi, a young coffee gofer)
- Bilqis Sharia (Zakia)

== Production ==
Yusuf al-Sibai’s original novel centered on the philosophy of life and death, pessimism and optimism. Published in 1952 by the University Publishing House, it was one director Salah Abu Seif tried repeatedly to film in the early 1970’s despite producers’ reluctant to underwrite a story so focused on death. Youssef Chahine found the idea compelling and came around to it, however, and decided to produce it jointly with the Tunisian company SATPC (French: Société anonyme tunisienne de production et d’expansion cinématographique or “Tunisian Film Production and Distribution Company”) in 1977. The screenplay was co-written by Mohsen Zayed and Abu Seif.

=== Filming ===
The filmmakers settled on Mohamed Sabo, best-known as a still photographer, as cinematographer despite his lack of film experience. He shot the footage over the course of a mere four weeks.

== Reception ==
The film has been considered Salu Abu Seif's most lyrical production and described as "a portrait of Cairo in the 1920s . This realistic story in pictures is told with humour and pathos, with masterly sketches of (...) eccentric figures".

The film was showcased at the 36th Venice International Film Festival in 1979.
