= Heart of the Night (film) =

- قلب الليل
- Directed by: Atef El Tayeb
- Written by: Naguib Mahfouz (story); Mohsen Zayed (screenplay and dialogue)
- Starring: Nour El-Sherif; Hala Sedki
- Music by: Moody el-Imam
- Release date: October 2, 1989
- Running time: 120 minutes
- Country: Egypt
- Language: Arabic

Heart of the Night (Arabic: قلب الليل, transliterated as Qalb al-Layl) is an Egyptian film first released in 1989. The film is directed by Atef El Tayeb, features a screenplay by Mohsen Zayed based on the novel of the same title by Naguib Mahfouz, and stars Nour El-Sherif, and Hala Sedki. The film adapts the novel's unconventional storytelling while hewing closely to the periods in which the narrator, Jaafar Ibrahim al-Sayed, set the tale. A metaphysical allegory, the film discusses man's endless search for safe harbor since his descent into the world with original sin and free will as his eternal burdens.

== Synopsis ==
Young Jaafar feels the urge to break free of his grandfather's authority. He abandons his studies at Al-Azhar University to follow his heart and marry the Roma shepherd Marwana, to which the grandfather objects and banishes him from the palace. Marwana expects Jaafar to start his own business and divorces him when it becomes clear he intends to keep writing lyrics for his friend, the singer Sheikhoun. Jaafar then marries a rich woman named Mrs. Huda, who spurns his intention to mooch off her, prompting him to study law to start a respectable career.

Failing as a lawyer, Jaafar tries to dabble in philosophy but is too psychologically and intellectually empty to pursue it. He becomes a recluse, writing a book to summarize his theories on politics, thought, and literature, but it turns out to be a study in obsession and confusion. A friend confronts him with a critique of his book and ideas. Jaafar responds by killing him and goes to prison with a life sentence. He escapes in a state of utter insanity, walking the streets of contemporary Cairo spouting gibberish.

== Analysis ==
Tayeb was previously best known as a director with a realist style, and Heart of the Night stands out for its introduction of symbolism to his style. The result has been called "symbolic realism" ("الواقعية الرمزية"). In particular, a metaphorical expression of the darkness of an existential night is shown through a more literal contrast between light in Jaafar's grandfather's house and darkness in street scenes at night.

The story is told from two primary points of view: that of Jaafar and that of his grandfather (the master narrator), who have a complex relationship. The elder patriarch clearly has the upper hand, firmly ruling the world of his son Ibrahim and grandson; though he lacks ill will toward them, his desire for control clashes with Ibrahim and Jaafar's identity as free spirits. Jaafar calls freedom his crown, his most valuable possession that he deserves to pay for until the end.

== See also ==
- Heart of the Night (novel)
