= Khairy Beshara =

Egyptian film director

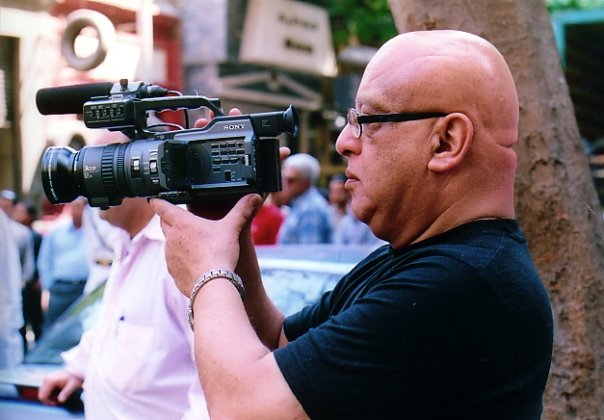
- Khairy Beshara
- Born: Khairy Beshara; June 30, 1947 (age 79); Tanta, Egypt
- Occupation: Film director

Khairy Beshara (Arabic: خيري بشارة, pronounced [ˈxæjɾi beˈʃɑːɾɑ]; born June 30, 1947, in Tanta, Egypt) is an Egyptian film director who has been active in the Egyptian film industry since the 1970s. He is considered one of the Egyptian directors who re-defined Realism in Egyptian cinema in the 1980s. In a recent book published by Bibliotheca Alexandrina in 2007 about the most important 100 films in the history of Egyptian cinema, three of his movies were listed: The Collar and the Bracelet, Bitter Day, Sweet Day, and Ice Cream in Gleem.

== Biography ==
Beshara completed his high school in Cairo then joined the Higher Institute of Cinema, where he graduated in 1967. During his time there, he studied film directing under the Egyptian director Youssef Chahine. He then went to Warsaw, Poland, on a fellowship for two years where he met his future wife, Monika Kowalczyk. He started his career with a focus on documentaries then moved to feature narratives and directed 12 long features that were screened at various international film festivals. He is one of the first Egyptian and Arab directors to venture into digital film making in the late 1990s. Beshara, among other new directors, was at the forefront of a reimagined take on realism in Egyptian cinema in the 1980s. His films shifted focus from previous realist films and embraced a different filming method. Beshara chose smaller scale subjects and favoured on-site filming.

== Career ==
Beshara was part of a new generation of directors that writers and film critics recognize as being at the forefront of a new wave of realism in Egyptian and Arab filmmaking in the 1980s. They diverted from the previous traditions of filmmaking by expressing their own creative ideas and embracing new technologies. This was influenced by the cultural and social conditions of the time. His contemporaries who were influential in this movement include Atef El-Tayeb, Mohamed Khan, Bashir El-Dik, and Daoud Abd El-Sayyed. He has been recognized for utilizing new digital techniques that stray from the traditional methods used in realist films from previous generations. He has been defined as a realist due to his subject matter, which focused on lower-middle-class life, recorded through on-site filming using an unembellished style. Beshara's portfolio contains many films shot in the new realism style, as well as a series of documentaries and television shows.

== Significant Works ==
Throughout his career, Beshara directed many feature films and documentaries, which have received recognition for being influential in the new wave of realism in Egyptian film. Writers recognize Beshara's film al-Tawq wal-Aswira as one that defined his reputation as a director. The film explores an honor killing that takes place in a lower-middle-class community in Southern Egypt. A number of his other films combined realism with comedic moments, making this style of film more popular and appealing to the audience. His films Ice Cream in Glim, Kaburya, Amrika Shikabika, and Harb al-Farawla, all use this method. After taking a 16-year hiatus from feature filmmaking, Beshara created Moondog, a docu-drama film that was screened at DIFF's Muhr Arab feature competition. While directing this film, he embraced digital techniques, which launched a departure from the style of his previous work and that of his contemporaries. The film combined technological experimentation and an investigation into a deeper aesthetic narrative of the story. Other highly regarded works of his include the film Fine Arts in Qatar, which was commissioned by Qatar in the early 1980s among others by Egyptian directors, as a reflection of the pan-Arabism culture of the time. In addition, his film Traffic Light won the Silver Pyramid award at the Cario Film Festival. This 1995 film has also been regarded as a shift back to experimental realism.

== Filmography ==
=== Documentaries and short films ===
- Tanks Hunter (1974) صائد الدبابات
- The Village Doctor (1975) طبيب فى الأرياف
- The Sea Gull (1976) طائر النورس
- Illumination (1977) تنوير
- The Talk of the Rocks (1978) حديث الحجر
- Surpassing Despair (1980) تجاوز اليأس
- Applied Arts in Qatar (1984) الفن التشكيلى فى قطر

=== Feature films ===
- Bloody Destinies (1982) الأقدار الدامية (Egyptian-Algerian co-production)
- House Boat No.70 (1982) العوامة رقم 70
- The Collar and the Bracelet (1986) الطوق والأسورة
- Sweet Day, Bitter Day (1988) يوم حلو..يوم مر
- Crab (Kaboria) (1990) كابوريا
- Wild Desire (1991) رغبة متوحشة
- Ice Cream in Gleem (1992) آيس كريم فى جليم
- America Abracadabra (America Shika Bika) (1993) (shot and edited in Romania) أمريكا شيكا بيكا
- Strawberry War (1993) حرب الفراولة
- Traffic Light (1995) اشارة مرور
- Nutshell (1995) قشر البندق
- A Night On The Moon (2008) -Digital film transferred to 35mm- ليلة فى القمر
- Moondog (2012)

=== Short films on development in Egypt ===
- Girls' Participation
- Female Genital Mutilation
- Children's Rights
- People with Disabilities
- Environmental Protection
- Training for Employment

(All were made in 1999)

=== TV series ===
- The Star 1999 (8 TV episodes on the life of the Egyptian actress, Nabila Ebeid) النجمة
- A Matter of Principle (Mas'alet Mabda') 2003 مسألة مبدأ
- The Salt of the Earth (Malh El 'ard) 2004 ملح الأرض
- Habiba's Heart ('alb Habiba) 2005 قلب حبيبة
- The Prey and the Hunter (Alfarisa Wal Sayyad) 2007 الفريسة والصياد
- THE ESCAPE FROM THE WEST (ALHROUB MEN ALGHARB) 2009 الهروب من الغرب
- OSTRICH FEATHERS (REESH NA3AM) 2010 ريش نعام
- Zaat (Self) 2012 / Episodes from 17 to 30 ذات الحلقات من ١٧ إلي ٣٠
- Second Wife 2013 الزوجة الثانية
- The people of Alexandria 2014 أهل اسكندرية
- Sulfur Red P1 2016 كبريت أحمر الجزء الأول
- The Flood 2017 الطوفان
- Karma's Curse 2018 لعنة كارما

== Prizes, awards and festivals participation ==
Tanks Hunter
1974 Leipzig 17th International Festival for Short &Documentary Films for Cinema and Television, Official Entry
1975 Sixth National Festival for Documentary and Short Films, Cairo, Egypt
Best Idea – Khairy Beshara
Best Photography – Mahmoud Abdel Samei

The Village Doctor
1976 The 7th National Festival for Documentary and Short Films, Cairo, Egypt
Golden Prize – Best Film in the category of medium long films
Best Direction & Scenario – Khairy Beshara
Best Photography – M. Abdel Samei
Best Editing – A. Metwally
Best Music – Dr. Youssef Shawki
Best Sound – M. Abdel Muteleb

1976 The Catholic Audio-Visual Center Award
Best Documentary “for its noble message of devoting one's experience to those who need it.. setting an example for a young doctor working in rural areas”

1976 The Egyptian Association of Cinema Critics (FIRPRESCI member)
Best Documentary “for its unique treatment in dealing with the Egyptian village and its problems...with awareness and a cinematographic view quite unusual for the Egyptian documentaries”

1976 Leipzig 19th International Film Festival
The International Students Union Festival Award

1978 The Encouragement State Award, The High Council of Arts, Literature
Award of Sciences & Arts of the First Degree

The Sea Gull
1977 The 8th National Festival for Documentary and Short Films, Cairo, Egypt (Medium Long Category)
Award for Direction & Scenario – Khairy Beshara
Award for Editing – K. Abul Ela

1977 The Egyptian Association of Cinema Critics (FIRPRESCI member)
Best Documentary concurrently with “Advises of a Wise Man on Rural Affairs & Education” by Daoud Abdel Sayed

Illumination
1978 The 9th National Festival for Documentary and Short Films, Cairo, Egypt (Long Documentary Category)
Best Direction – Khairy Beshara
Best Photography – M. Fadel

Rock Talks
1979 The 10th National Festival for Documentary and Short Films, Cairo, Egypt
Best Editing – Ahmed Metwally

1979 Leipzig 22nd International Festival for Short & Documentary Films for Cinema and Television, Official Entry

1980 Sixth Festival of Egyptian Film
Film Society Award for the Best Short Film

1980 The Egyptian Association of Cinema Critics (FIRPRESCI member)
Best Documentary concurrently with “Working in the Field” by Daoud Abdel Sayed “for its distinguished creative capacity in expressing the character of the Egyptian Sculptor Abdel Badie Abdel Hay”

1980 The Folk Culture Department
Certificate of Appreciation – K. Beshara “In appreciation of his distinguished efforts and his excellence in the fields of scenario and direction...”

Bloody Destinies
1983 Cinema Prizes Competition, Ministry of Culture, Cairo, Egypt
Best Debut Direction – K. Beshara

House-Boat No. 70

“If we consider ‘The will’ by Kamel Selim in 1939 the beginning of Egyptian realism in cinema, so we have to admit that ‘House-Boat No.70’ by Khairy Beshara, 1982, is the start of the new realism”

Samir Farid (prominent film critic) in his book “New Realism in Egyptian Cinema”, 1991.

1982 The Egyptian Association of Cinema Critics (FIRPRESCI member)
Best Feature Film “because he was able to express the problems of the 70's generation in a new innovative way which reflects maturity of the new Egyptian Cinema”

1982 First Cairo International Film Festival (Panorama of Egyptian Films)
First Prize for the Producer

1982 The 35th International Film Festival Cannes (Film Market)

1982 The 18th International Festival for Young Cinematographers, Hyeres, France, Official Entry

1982 First Film Festival for Mediterranean Cultures, Bastia, France, Official Entry

1982 Valencia III International Film Festival for Mediterranean Cultures, Spain, Official Entry

1983 Rotterdam International Film Festival, The Netherlands (Main Program)
It was the First Egyptian film ever to be screened at the Rotterdam festival

1983 Cinema Prizes Competition, Ministry of Culture, Cairo, Egypt
Best Music – Gehad Daoud
Best Supporting Actress – Magda El Khattib

1983 The 9th festival of the Egyptian Film Society
The Special Jury Award for Direction – K. Beshara
Best Photography – M. Abdel Samei
Certificate to the Producer – M. Mostafa

1985 Screened in several Yugoslavian cities on the occasion of cultural events

The Collar & the Bracelet
1985 The 9th Film Festival of the Egyptian Association for Cinematographic Art
Best Direction – K. Beshara

1986 Valencia 7th International Film Festival for Mediterranean Cultures, Spain
Bronze Award

1986 The 11th Cinematographic Days of Carthage, Tunis (Official Entry)

1986 The Three Continents Film Festival, Nantes, France (Official Entry)

1987 Rotterdam International Film Festival, The Netherlands (Main Program)

1987 Strasbourg 15th Film Festival, France
International Institute of Human Rights within the program “Carte Blanche” of the Egyptian Young Cinema proposed by Mohamed Khan (Film Director)

1987 The 5th Arab Film Festival, Paris, France (Main Program)

1987 The 13th Festival of the Egyptian Film society
Best Film – El Alamia for Cinema & TV production, Hussein El Kalla
Best Direction – K. Beshara
Best Photography – Tarek El Telmessany
Best Editing – Adel Mounir
Best Music – Entessar Abdel Fattah
Best Actress - Sherihan

1987 The Egyptian Association of Cinema Critics (FIRPRESCI member) Best Egyptian Feature Film of 1986

1987 The 4th Academic Week for Graduates of the Higher Institute of Cinema, Aswan, Egypt, Best Direction Award

1987 The 5th Damascus Film Festival, Syria

1987 The 11th São Paulo International Film Festival, Brazil

1987 The 31st London Film Festival, United Kingdom

1987 Hollywood on the Nile – The Realists and their films – Egyptian Film in Metropolis Cinema, Hamburg, West Germany

1987 Mediterranean Cinema Festival, Montpellier, France

1989 “The Collar & the Bracelet” Between the Film and Yehia El Taher Abdallah's Novel and the Film's Position in Egyptian Cinema, M.A. Thesis by Beaty Klimkiewicz, Warsaw University, Neofilology Department, Poland

1996 The Centennial of Arab Cinema, Lincoln Center, New York, US

1996 The 6th Edition of Black Movie, Genève, Switzerland

Sweet Day, Bitter Day
1988 The 12th Cinematographic Days of Carthage, Tunis
Best Actress – Faten Hamama

1988 The Three Continents Film Festival, Nantes, France
Special Mention

1988 “Cinema & Reality of the 80's in Egypt”, M.A. Thesis by Viola Shafik, Hamburg University, Germany

1989 The 15th Festival of the Egyptian Film Society
Best Actress – Faten Hamama
Best Set Designer – Onsi Abou Seif
Special Mention – Ahmed Hussein (12-year-old boy with major role in the film)

1989 The Egyptian Film Society Survey
Best Film of the year 1988

1989 The Cinema Pharaohs Magazine Survey, Alexandria, Egypt
Best Film of the year 1988

1989 The 12th Cairo Film Festival
The Advertising Prize

1989 Film Fest Munchen, West Germany (International Program)

1989 The 18th International Festival of Cinema, Figueira da Foz, Portugal

1989 The 3rd International Film Festival, Rabat, Morocco
Special Jury Prize

1989 The 10th Mostra De Valencia, Spain (Information Section)

1989 Montreal World Film Festival, Canada, “Today's Cinema, Tomorrow's Cinema” Program

1993 Mostra Internazionale del Nuovo Cinema, Pesaro, Italy

Crabs (Kaboria)
1991 Tage des un Abhangizen Films, Augsburg, Germany

1991 The Egyptian Association for Cinematographic Art
Best Direction

1991 The First National Feature Film Festival, Cairo, Egypt
Special Jury Award
Best Actress – Raghda
Best Photography – Mohsen Ahmed

1996 “Mass Culture & Modernism in Egypt” a book by Walter Armbrust, Cambridge University Press.

Wild Desire
1991 Montreal World Film Festival, Canada, “Today's Cinema, Tomorrow's Cinema” Program

Ice Cream in Gleem
1993 The 19th Festival of the Egyptian Film Society
Special Jury Award

America Abracadabra (America Shika Bika)
1993 The 11th Damascus Film Festival, Syria (Main Program)

1994 The 4th Pyongyang Film Festival, Korea
The Special Prize of the Juries

1997 The International House of Philadelphia, US, Contemporary Egyptian Cinema

Traffic Light 1995 The 19th Cairo International Film Festival
Special Jury Prize “Silver Pyramid”

“The Jury believes that ‘Traffic Light’ deserves the award because it managed to paint with great sensitivity a nation's troubles in a single night during a crowded traffic light of the city of Cairo”

1997 II Cinema Dei Paesi Arabi, Cinema Del Comune Di Bologna, Italy

== In the press ==
The best of Egyptian cinema, the best 15 best Egyptian films of all time

== See also ==
- List of Copts
- List of Egyptians
