= Heart of the Night (novel) =

1975 Egyptian novel

- Author: Naguib Mahfouz
- Original title: قلب الليل
- Language: Arabic
- Genre: Novel
- Publisher: Library of Egypt, Dar Shorouq
- Publication date: 1975
- Publication place: Egypt
- Pages: 155 pp (paperback)
- ISBN: 9789778060164
- Preceded by: –

Heart of the Night (Arabic: قلب اليل) is a short novel by Egyptian novelist Naguib Mahfouz. It consists of 155 pages and was first published by The Library of Egypt in 1975. Dar Shorouq reprinted the novel in 2006.

The novel was adapted into a film in 1989, with its first screening on October 2 of the same year. The film was directed by Atef El-Tayeb and starred Farid Shawqi, Nour El-Sherif, Hala Sedky, Mahmoud el-Gendy, and several other actors.

In 2019, Odekhiren Amaize produced and dramatized the final scene of Naguib Mahfouz’s "Heart of the Night" from a 2011 English Language translation by Aida A. Bamia (The American University in Cairo Press, 2010) in a short film directed by Roozbeh Ali Kafi in Dubai’s Al Fahidi Historical Neighbourhood.

== See also ==
- Heart of the Night (film)
