= Alexandria Radio =

Egyptian radio station

Alexandria Radio (Arabic: إذاعة الإسكندرية) is an Egyptian radio station based in Alexandria. Opening in 1954, it is considered the oldest regional radio station in the Arab world. On July 26 of that year, the Minister of National Guidance appointed Hafez Abdel Wahab as its founding director, putting him on air that same Monday at 2:00 PM.

== Notable figures ==
The poet Mahmoud Al-Kamshushi contributed many works for the station until his death in 1971, including its opening song "احنا الشعب الحر" (“We Are the Free People”). He co-wrote scripted series with Abdel Wahab for the station, including في الامر جريمة (“Criminal Matters”) and برنامج حميدو (“The Hamido Show”), and was sole author of scripts for the annual “musical riddle” show Fawazeer Ramadan. Other contributors included Baligh Hamdi, Jamal Tawakkol, Ali Nour, Ahmed Al Sarjani, Nabil Atef, Raja Hagras, Tahani Abu Al-Saud, Ali Al-Laithi, Saber Mustafa, Hussein Abu Al-Makrem, Mahmoud Sharkas, and Abdel-Hay Shehata.
