= Land of Hypocrisy =

- Directed by: Fatin Abdel Wahab
- Screenplay by: Saad El Din Wahba
- Based on: Land of Hypocrisy (novel) by Yusuf Sibai
- Starring: Fouad El Mohandes
- Cinematography: Wadid Sery
- Edited by: Hussein Ahmed
- Music by: Gordon Sherwood
- Release date: 1968
- Running time: 120 minutes
- Country: Egypt
- Language: Arabic

Land of Hypocrisy (Arabic: أرض النفاق, translit. Ard el Nifaq) is a 1968 Egyptian comedy-drama film by Fatin Abdel Wahab. It is based on Yusuf Sibai's novel of the same name. The novel was previously depicted in the 1950 Egyptian film Virtue for Sale.

== Cast ==
- Fouad El Mohandes as Masoud Abu El Saad
- Shwikar as Ilham
- Samiha Ayoub as Susu
- Hassan Mostafa as Uweiga Afandi (The manager)
- Abdelrahim El Zarakany as The shopkeeper

== See also ==
- Cinema of Egypt
- Lists of Egyptian films
- List of Egyptian films of the 1960s
- List of Egyptian films of 1968
