= Gabr Al Khawater =

- جبر الخواطر
- Directed by: Atef El Tayeb
- Written by: Abdel Fattah Rezk (story); Bashir El Deek (screenplay and dialogue)
- Produced by: Hany Gerges Fawzi
- Starring: Sherihan; Ashraf Abdel Baqi; Alaa Waley El Din; Hassan Mustafa; Farida Saif Al-Nasr
- Cinematography: Samir Farag
- Edited by: Ahmed Metwally
- Music by: Yasser Abdel Rahman
- Production companies: United Artists for Cinema and Video
- Distributed by: Tamedo Film Production and Distribution
- Release date: May 18, 1998
- Running time: 120 minutes
- Country: Egypt
- Language: Arabic

Gabr Al Khawater (Arabic: جبر الخواطر lit. “Forced Thoughts”) is an Egyptian film released on May 18, 1998. The film is directed by Atef El Tayeb, features a screenplay written by Bashir El Deek based on a story by Abdel Fattah Rezk, and stars Sherihan, Ashraf Abdel Baqi, Alaa Waley El Din, Hassan Mustafa, and Farida Saif Al-Nasr. The plot centers on a psychiatrist and a group of patients at a women's psychiatric hospital in Alexandria.

== Cast ==
- Sherihan (Nawal Ibrahim al-Saadi)
- Ashraf Abdel Baqi (Dr. Mahmoud Shaker, a psychiatrist)
- Alaa Waley El Din (Dr. Tharwat)
- Hassan Mustafa (Dr. El-Meliguy, director of the psychiatric hospital)
- Farida Saif Al-Nasr (Loza)
- Sanaa Younes (Farfoura)
- Tarek Lotfy (Abbas, Nawal's journalist friend)
- Enaam Salousa (Nabawiya)
- Gihan Fadel (Queen Mary)
- Hend Akef (Mambousia)
- Lamiaa el-Geddawy (Amal, Nawal's sister)
- Galeela Mahmood (Nawal's mother)
- Nahed Ismail (Nurse Laila, the ward officer)
- Gharib Mahmoud (Al-Bably, Nawal's new father-in-law)
- Diaa Abdelhaq (policeman)
- Alan Zogby (psychiatrist)
- Jalal Othman (Emad, Nawal's husband)
- Aisha al-Kilani
- Amani Selim
- Mahasin Al-Najdi
- Maya al-Masry
- Ahmed al-Taher
- Yousry Embabi
- Abdullah Hefni
- Muhammad Gawish (Adel, Nawal's young son)
- Salem al-Laithi (Sadiq, Nawal's maternal uncle)

== Synopsis ==
Dr. Mahmoud Shaker (Ashraf Abdel Baqi) is transferred out of his post as a prison counselor for sympathizing with prisoners and conveying their complaints to wardens. He ends up at a women's psychiatric hospital in Alexandria. He continues to support the inmates’ grievances here with the director, Dr. El-Meliguy (Hassan Mustafa), who is using his charges as guinea pigs for experiments on new treatments in the lab he runs with some foreigners. Gene therapy, involved with one of them, has killed at least one.

Mahmoud observes a wide variety of ailments in the asylum. Loza (Farida Saif Al-Nasr) has obsessive-compulsive disorder, which alienated her from her fishmonger husband. Farfoura (Sanaa Younes), who graduated from a cosmetology school, was spurned by a fiancé for her younger sister and became a pyromaniac. Nabawiya (Enaam Salousa), a school principal committed to the institution, thought the morning queue was necessary to live. Mambousia (Hend Akef) is a nymphomaniac. Finally, Nawal Ibrahim al-Saadi (Sherihan) is ostensibly a depressive schizophrenic after accidentally killing her infant son.

Dr. Shaker learns from his colleague Dr. Tharwat (Alaa Waley El Din) of Nawal's case history and sympathizes greatly, but Dr. El-Meliguy is equally interested in her as a test subject. Considering Nawal's behavior more rational than it has been labeled, especially in a university-age woman, he meets her mother (Galeela Mahmood) who appears to share El-Meliguy's pathological viewpoint. Nawal's maternal uncle Sadiq (Salem al-Laithi) brings in her younger sister Amal Lamiaa el-Geddawy, who tells Dr. Shaker that she and Nawal's father died when they were young. The mother was busy with her new husband Al-Bably, so Nawal took care of Amal.

Nawal's high school sweetheart Abbas (Tarek Lotfy) became a journalist but abandoned her after taking her virginity, and she married Imad, who discovered but accepted her having had sex before. Six after giving birth to her son with Imad, Adel (Muhammad Gawish), Nawal discovered that he had another childless wife whom Imad wanted to raise Adel. Nawal clutched her son so tightly as they reached for him that he almost choked; she was told that he had died and went insane, leading Amal to adopt Adel. Dr. Shaker discovers that Dr. El-Meliguy is paying Nawal's mother to experiment on the young woman, an arrangement that suits Amal fine to keep custody of Adel. Dr. Shaker stops the gene therapy session at the last minute by bringing in Adel to see Nawal and thus make her aware that her son is alive, beginning her true recovery.

== Production ==
Director Atef El Tayeb died on June 23, 1995, at the age of 47 following complications from heart valve repair surgery. Gabr Al Khawater, his 21st film, was being edited at the time. Editor Ahmed Metwally completed the film, which was shown at the opening of the 1998 Alexandria International Film Festival.

== Reception ==
Film critic Mohsen Waifi wrote in the newspaper Al-Hayat on September 5, 1995, that the film shows:

the level of corruption of health care, continuing his thread of social commentary that stretched from The Bus Driver to A Hot Night.”…But the corruption is shrouded in ambiguity…[since] we do not know any clear motivation for the hospital director’s actions.

As far as the style of the film, Waifi writes that:

The director, Atef El Tayeb, and the editor, Ahmed Metwally (who finished the film after El Tayeb’s sudden and tragic death) tries to break the narrative pattern of the setting by going out to the seashore or by taking shots of a seagull.

Waifi concludes:

The film lacks cinematic intimacy and variety, which detracts from both its artistic credibility and the audience’s sympathies for the institutionalized, despite intense method acting that was grueling for everyone, especially Sherihan… Gabr Al Khawater comes across as a collage of images without rhythm or soul, missing the distinctive touch of El Tayeb’s most compelling work.

Mostafa Hamza wrote for Masrawy on June 23, 2021, that Sherihan decided to retire after the release of Gabr Al Khawater, which she corroborated in a television interview with Amira Abdel Azim on the talk show ليلتي (“My Night”). In this interview, Sherihan set the record straight on allegations such as those of meddling in Metwally's editing after El Tayeb's death. In her words:

I attended Metwally’s editing sessions to help him achieve El Tayeb’s vision, including musical and visual concepts he had shared with me in his last days. I was shocked to hear after the fact about my interfering with the editing and direction, something I have never done in my life.
