= Keep Your Daughters Locked In =

1980 Egyptian play

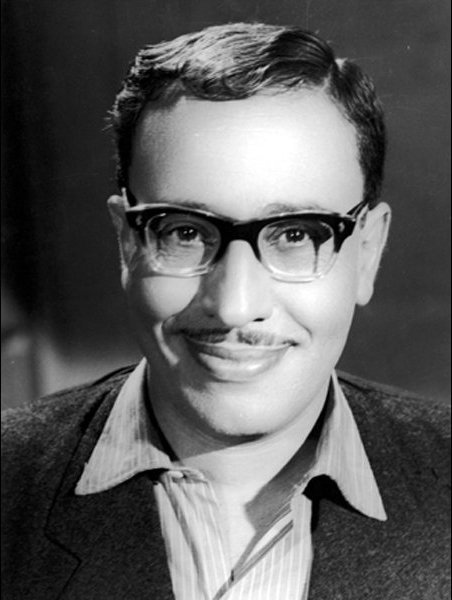
Fouad El-Mohandes, the director and lead actor of the play

Keep Your Daughters Locked In (Arabic: سك على بناتك, romanized: Sukk 'Ala Banatak) is a popular Egyptian play that debuted in 1980. The comedy is a hallmark of Egyptian theatre and has enjoyed enduring popularity since its release. It is notable for its humorous take on family dynamics and social issues in Arabic societies, delivered through a blend of wit and slapstick comedy. The play, produced by the Arab Media Production Company in Riyadh (Arabic: الشركة العربية للإنتاج الإعلامي) and directed by Fouad El-Mohandes, was written by Lenin El-Ramly. It has a runtime of approximately four hours and is structured into three acts: Act One, Act Two (comprising the first and second scenes), and Act Three.

The play addresses the issues of marriage in Arab society. The central character, Dr. Raafat (played by Fouad El-Mohandes), is a widower eager to marry off his three daughters quickly so he can marry his beloved Esmat (played by Shwikar). Throughout the play, he encounters various problems. Meanwhile, his youngest daughter Soso (played by Sherihan) accidentally discovers his intention and that he loves a girl called Esmat, leading to a series of complications.

The play's first performance was on July 10, 1980. It received widespread acclaim and became an integral part of (Eid) holiday traditions in Arab countries, with many families watching it as a festive ritual. The play also contributed to the careers of its cast members, solidifying their status as prominent figures in Egyptian entertainment. It play has been written about and discussed in numerous books and films.

== Plot summary ==
The events of the play revolve around Dr. Raafat, a widowed father who is overly protective of his three daughters, Fawzia, Nadia, and Sousou. Dr. Raafat, a respected faculty member, falls in love with a woman named Esmat twelve years after his wife's death. However, he believes he cannot marry Esmat while his daughters are still living at home, so he tries to marry them off quickly. One day, while talking on the landline with Esmat, Sousou overhears their conversation and learns of her father's intentions. She then attempts to thwart his efforts in various ways. In his bid to preserve their reputation and keep them away from unsuitable suitors, Dr. Raafat faces numerous challenges. His daughters' clever schemes and comedic interventions often undermine his plans. As events unfold, Dr. Raafat's attempts to control his daughters' lives and marry them off to high-ranking individuals lead to a series of humorous misunderstandings and chaotic situations, highlighting the generational gap and the evolving roles of women in society.

== Cast and characters ==
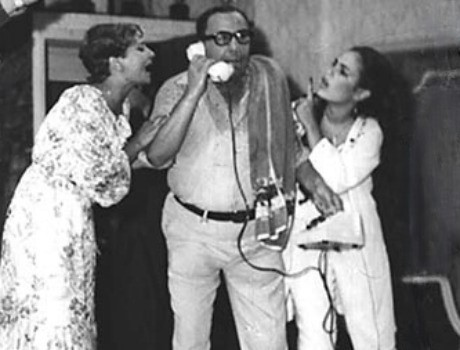
Fouad El-Mohandes, Sherihan, and Ijlal Zaki in the play.

- Fouad El-Mohandes as Dr. Raafat
- Sherihan as Amal
- Sanaa Younis as Fawzia
- Ijlal Zaki as Nadia
- Ahmed Rateb as Sameh
- Mohsen Mohieldin as Mohsen
- Zakaria Mowafi as Kareem
- Badr Nofal as Mr. Fathalab
- Shwikar as Dr. Raafat's lover, Esmat (Note: She did not appear on stage, and performed her role audibly on the landline.)

And several minor characters played their role at the wedding.

== Production and reception ==
Fouad El-Mohandes loved the theater and never felt tired while standing on stage. He always said, "My health comes from work, and I go to the theater every day feeling like a young man who is going to meet his girlfriend." This is how his son described his father's love for the theater. Speaking about his rituals while presenting a theatrical work, he said: "He used to make sure to go early, so if the show started at ten, he would go at eight and be sure that everyone had attended. He would start dressing for the first act at nine, and the theater would be completely empty during this period. He would stand behind the curtain and begin reading the Quran back and forth, and no one dared to interrupt him or talk to him during that period. I used to attend the scenes of most plays with him, and the best scenes were during the play 'Sukk on Your Daughters'."

Sukk on Your Daughters was produced during a vibrant period for Egyptian theatre, with many plays addressing contemporary social issues through humor. The play was well-received for its sharp dialogue, engaging storyline, and the strong performances of its cast, particularly Fouad el-Mohandes and Sherihan. Actress Aisha Al-Kilani temporarily played the character Fawzia while actress Sanaa Younis was traveling abroad to film a series. The stick used by Fouad el-Mohandes to hit Sanaa Younis in the play was hollow to produce a loud sound without causing injury. When the play's performances began, the character Hanafi was portrayed by Osama Abbas. However, after Abbas withdrew from the production, Fouad el-Mohandes assigned the role to Muhammad Abu Al-Hassan, who had previously appeared in the play as the head of the waitstaff in the opening scene.

== Cultural impact and legacy ==
The play has had a significant cultural impact in Egypt and across the Arab world. It is considered a classic of Egyptian theatre and has been re-staged numerous times since its original production. The humor and themes of the play resonate with audiences, making it a timeless piece that continues to be relevant. One of the most memorable lines in the play is delivered by Fouad El-Mohandes, who advises, "We must keep our daughters locked in, but hold the key in their hands." This line suggests that fathers should not constantly supervise their daughters. Instead, they should teach them to have a sense of personal responsibility and awareness of God's presence.

On September 6, 2014, marking what would have been Fouad El-Mohandes's 90th birthday, the actress Sherihan paid tribute to the late artist with whom she had performed in several notable comedy plays. On her Twitter page, Sherihan shared a photo of herself with Fouad El-Mohandes from the play. She wrote, "My father, my teacher, and my beloved... Your creativity, your art, your character, your sincerity, your commitment, and your humility are still felt by everyone. Your presence and love remain in my heart to this day... You have never left. I have never seen anyone like you, Mr. Fouad El-Mohandes.”
