= The Most Dangerous Man in the World =

- Directed by: Niazi Mostafa
- Screenplay by: Geog Burgen; Abdel Hai Lurd; Bahgat Amor
- Starring: Fouad El Mohandes; Shwikar
- Cinematography: Kamal Karim
- Edited by: Abdel Aziz Fakhry
- Music by: Hussein El Sayed; Munir Mourad
- Production company: General Company for Arab Film Production (Filmentaj)
- Distributed by: General Company for Film Distribution and Release
- Release date: 1 January 1967 (Egypt)
- Running time: 100 minutes
- Country: Egypt
- Language: Egyptian Arabic

The Most Dangerous Man in the World (Arabic: أخطر رجل في العالم, romanized: Akhṭar Rajul fī l-ʿĀlam) is a 1967 Egyptian crime comedy film directed by Niazi Mostafa.

== Plot ==
Mr. X, the head of an international smuggling gang in Chicago, arrives in Cairo to carry out his activities. The police learn of his presence and begin to monitor him. The police exploit the great resemblance between Mr. X and airport employee Zaki, using him in their mission, and the events unfold in a comedic fashion.

== Cast ==
- Fouad El Mohandes as Zaki/Mr. X
- Shwikar as Nadia
- Suheir El Babbly as Sonia, the mob boss
- Adel Adham as Interpol agent
- Cannan Wasfi as Marshello
- Sami Sabry as Lucian

== See also ==
- Cinema of Egypt
- Lists of Egyptian films
- List of Egyptian films of the 1960s
- List of Egyptian films of 1967
