= Fouad el-Mohandes =

Egyptian actor (1924–2006)

Fouad El Mohandes فؤاد المهندس
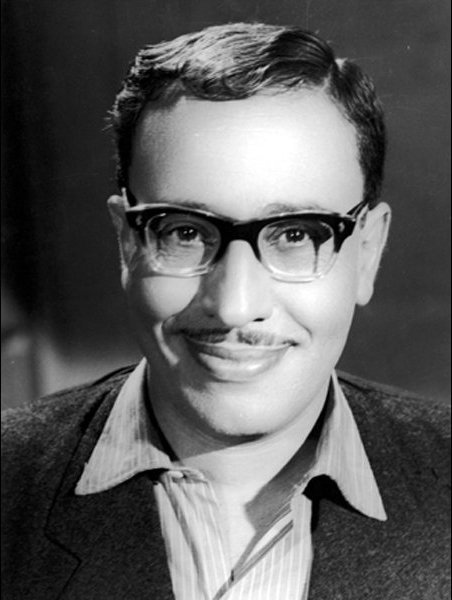
- Born: Fouad Zaki El Mohandes; September 6, 1924; Abbassia, Cairo, Egypt
- Died: September 16, 2006 (aged 82); Zamalek, Cairo, Egypt
- Other names: The professor Mohandes Comedy
- Occupations: actor, comedian, singer and radio personality
- Years active: 1952–2000
- Spouses: Iffat Sorour; Shwikar (m. 1963; div. 1983)
- Partner: Shwikar
- Children: 2

Fouad Zaki El Mohandes Arabic: فؤاد زكي المهندس; known as Fouad El Mohandes (or Fuad el-Mohandess; Arabic: فؤاد المهندس; September 6, 1924 – September 16, 2006) was an Egyptian comedian, stage and screen actor, and star from the 1950s specializing mostly in comedy roles in dozens of theater, cinema, and TV hits spanning five decades.

== Biography ==
Born in Abbassia, Cairo. he was the son of linguist Zaki Mohamed El Mohandes, the dean of the faculty of Dar al-Oloom and a member of the Arabic language Academy of Egypt. Therefore, their home was a fortress to preserve the Arabic language, which he mastered through his father, who was the one who had the first credit in developing his artistic talents. el-Mohandes was survived by a brother and two sisters, one of whom is the late Safiya el-Mohandes, who was the head of Television and Radio station for more than ten years successively, and a noted Egyptian broadcaster who was married to Mohamed Mahmoud Shaaban (known as Baba Sharo), who was also the head of the Television and Radio stations for more than 18 years successively and successfully.

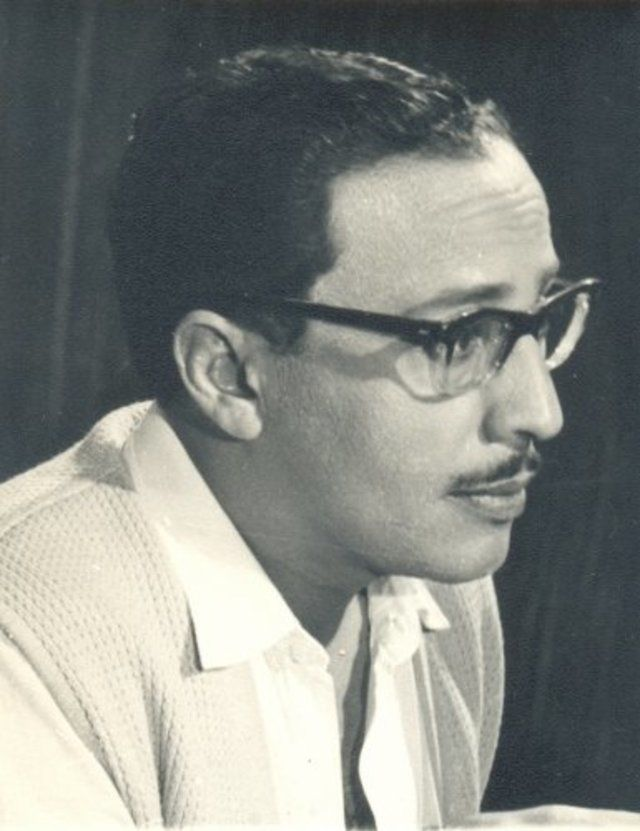

El-Mohandes grew up in the Al-Azab Turkish schools. He is an amateur actor when he was young. Inspired by the plays of comedian Naguib Al Rehani (Who liked el-Mohandes’s performance in the play Al Dunia Ala Kaf Afrit [The world is on the palm of imp]) during his study at the faculty of commerce, el-Mohandes decided to pursue a career in drama. Salah Zulfikar, his close friend and neighbor from Abbassiya neighborhood helped to introduce him to his brothers Ezz El-Dine Zulfikar and Mahmoud Zulfikar and they were a major reason in launching el-Mohandes’s cinematic career. He joined a group named Sa'a li Qalbak (An hour to your heart) during its early run. His important leading roles: "Sapawy" in Aelet Zizi (Zizi's family), "Zaki / Mr.X." in Akhtar ragol fi el aalam (The Most Dangerous Man in the World), "Bassiouni" in El Ard El Tayyeba (The Good Earth), "Abdul-Salam Al-Damanhouri" in Khali balak min giranak (Watch out for your neighbours), And much more. At the time, he also presented in radio broadcasting in the 1960s: Aaelet marzouk (Marzouk's family), Sa'aa le albek (An hour for your heart), and Kilmitein Wi-Bas (Two Words Only), which was broadcast daily for more than 15 years.

His comedy role in Aa'ilat Zizi (Zizi's Family), directed by Fatin Abdel Wahab, was one of the most significant roles in his career. In addition, he and his then-wife, Shwikar, were a well-known acting couple, co-starring in many film and stage comedies such as: Mutarada Gharamiya (An Amorous Pursuit), Ard El Nifaq (Land of Hypocrisy), and Akhtar Ragul Fil Aalam (The Most Dangerous Man In The World). His most important leading roles in Theaters: Ana wa howa wa heia (I, he, & she), Sayedity el gamila (my beautiful women), El secerteair el fani (The technical secretary), Ana fin wenty fein (Where am I, and where are you). He also appeared in leading roles with Adel Emam (still a young actor and a beginner), such as the play Ana w Huwwa w Hiyya (Me, Him, and Her) in 1964. He starred in Mahmoud Zulfikar's Agazat Gharam (Love Vacation) in 1967, and with Saeed Saleh in a film in 1970. However, he returned to roles with Adel Emam in films like Khalli Balak Min Giranak (Watch Out for Your Neighbours) in the 1990s. The 1960s were el-Mohandes' golden age. He made some successful plays, such as: El-Sekerteir El-Fanni (The Technical Secretary), Sayydati El-Gameela (the Arabic adaptation of My Fair Lady), and Hawwa' El-Sa'aa 12 (Eve of Midnight). Later in his career, his interest shifted back to theater, working in plays such as: Innaha Haqqan Aa'ila Muhtarama (It is Truly a Respected Family), Hala Habibty (Hala my Love), and Rawhia Etkatafet (Rawhia is Kidnapped).

Some of his supporting roles were in: Bein El Atlaal (Among the Ruins) with Faten Hamama, Uyoon Sahranah (Wakeful Eyes) with Salah Zulfikar & Shadia, Amirat El Arab (Princess of the Arabs), El Sahera El Sagheera (The Little Witch) with Soad Hosni, Roshdy Abaza & Madiha Yousri, Nahr El Hob (River of Love) with Omar Sharif & Faten Hamama, Maww’ed fil Bourj (A Date at the Tower) with Salah Zulfikar & Soad Hosny, Almaz Wi Abdo El-Hamuli (Almaz and Abdu El-Hamuli) with Warda Al-Jazairia & Hussein Riad, El Shumoo' El Sawda (Black Candles) with Saleh Selim & Nagat El-Sagheera, and El Beyh el Bauab (The Master... Janitor) with Ahmed Zaki & Ragaa Al Geddawy & Safia El Emari.

== Personal life ==
El Mohandes married twice. With his first wife, Effat Sorour, he fathered two sons: Ahmed, a civil Engineer whose daughter Habiba studied in Cairo's DSB school, and now lives in Canada, and Mohamed, a businessman whose son Omar is studying in AUC.

=== Fouad & Shwikar ===
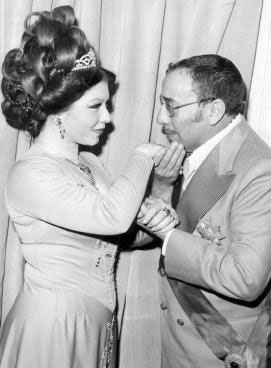
el-Mohandes & his ex-wife Shwikar in 1963.

The duo "Fouad and Shwikar" was one of the most famous comedic duos in Arab cinema and theater. they met for the first time during the performance of the play El secerteair el fani (The technical secretary). Shwikar said that he asked her for marriage during the performance of the play Ana wa howa wa heia (I, he, & she), so that el-Mohandes departed from the script for the first time in his life, saying: "Will you marry me, my sweetheart?" The marriage took place after completing the filming of the film Runaway from Marriage (Hareb men el-zawag), and in the last scene Shwikar wore a bride dress and headscarf, and el-Mohandes was wearing a suit and tie. So the two took advantage of this scene and after filming they went to the Ma'zoun at two in the morning to culminate their love story in marriage in November 1963. the director Hassan Al-Saifi and his wife, Zahra Al-Ola went with them. Then they divorced after 20 years of marriage. However, with the occurrence of the divorce, their artistic works continued, such as the plays: Rawhia etkatafet (Rawhia is kidnapped) and Meraty takreban (My wife almost), as well as the series: Dreams of the spider (Ahlam el-Ankabot) and A crime of only a quarter (Garema Ela Rob'a). Despite the separation, They were keen on the continuation of the friendship between them, especially that Fouad loves food from Shwikar, and the friendship lasted for 20 years until the death of el-Mohandes in 2006, and she was with him until the last day of his life. Shwikar admitted in one of her meetings that she only loved Fouad el-Mohandes, describing him as the love of her life, which she did not move away from until the last moments of his life.

Fouad el-Mohandes is well known for his roles in movies in which he tried to put a comic and distinctly Arab spin on famous American movies, idols, and characters. He played his most famous role as Mr X in two movies: The Most Dangerous Man in the World and The Return of the Most Dangerous Man in the World. He also depicted characters based on real-life figures, such as John Dillinger (referred to as Sayed Dillinger), Billy the Kid, and Mussolini.

Although he made nearly 70 movies, Fouad el-Mohandes loved the theater so much. He believed in the necessity of presenting a social message through his work. He presented the problem of shelters through the comedy play Hala Habibty (Hala, my sweetheart), which explained the abuse that children receive in the shelters. Also presented the children's problems in the play Sok Ala Banatak (Lock Your Girls In). el-Mohandes was presenting the play Enaha hakan a'lah mohtarama (It is really a respectable family) with Amina Rizk and Shwikar, while he was suffering from heart clot, and doctors assured him that he had recovered from it through his work on the stage. el-Mohandes believed that art has a sublime mission, which is serving the community. And because he loved children, he was looking for a work with children. And he was lucky in that after presenting Fawazir Amo Fouad, who was watched by all children in Egypt and the Arab world.

About singing in his works, el-Mohandes started that in the play Ana fin wenty fein (Where am I, and where are you) with the song "Rayeh ageeb al deeb min diloh". After that, he presented many songs in his artistic works. He presented many songs to children because he loved singing from a young age, as he was the head of the band of nasheeds in the elementary school.

== Death ==
During the last few years of his life, Fouad el-Mohandes had many liver problems which lead to his death on 16 September 2006, in Zamalek, Cairo, Egypt

== Filmography ==
- El Ard el Tayeba (The Good Land) (1954)
- Bint El Geeran (The Neighbor's Daughter) (1954)
- Uyoon Sahranah (Wakeful Eyes) (1956)
- Bayn Al-Atlal (Among the Ruins) (1959)
- Nahr Al-Hobb (The River of Love) (1960)
- Hub fi hub (Love and More Love) (1960)
- Maww’ed Mal Maadi (Rendezvous with the Past) (1961)
- Al shoumou el sawdaa (Black Candles) (1962)
- El Telmiza (The Student) (1962)
- Maww’ed fil borg (A Date at the Tower) (1962)
- El Motamarreda (The Rebel) (1963)
- Ana Wa Huwa Wa Hiya (I, He and She) (1964)
- Al ariss yassel ghadan (The Groom Arrives Tomorrow) (1964)
- Chabab wa hub wa marah (Youth, Love and Joy) (1964)
- Sahib el galala (His Majesty) (1964)
- Iterafat zoj (A Husband's Confessions) (1965)
- Zawga Mn Paris (A Wife from Paris) (1966)
- Guanab el safir (His Excellency The Ambassador) (1966)
- Agazet gharam (Love Vacation) (1967)
- Akhtar ragol fil alam (The Most Dangerous Man in the World) (1967)
- Mabodet el gamahir (The Audiences Beloved) (1967)
- Al ragol da hai ganini (This Man is Driving Me Mad) (1967)
- Aalam modhek geddan (A Very Funny World) (1968)
- Ard el-nefak (Land of Hypocrisy) (1968)
- Kilmitayn Wa Bas (Just Few Words) (1968)
- Al-Sikirtir Al-Fanni (The Technical Secretary) (1968)
- Merati magnouna... magnouna... magnouna (My Wife is Mad, Mad, Mad) (1968)
- Al millionaire al mouzayyaf (The Fake Millionaire) (1968)
- Moutarada gharamia (An Amorous Pursuit) (1968)
- Shanabo fil massiada (Shanabo in Trap) (1968)
- Sayedaty Al Jamila (My Fair Lady) (Arabic adaptation) (1969)
- Viva Zalata (1976)
- Sok Ala Banatak (Keep Your Daughters Locked In) (1980) (script by Lenin El-Ramly)
- Ayoub (Ayoub) (1983)
- Ammo Fuad Series that went on for more than 10 years in the 1990s (Ramadan TV Competition for children)
- Oyun (Eyes) with Sanaa Gamil
- Robabkia [ written by Farid Shawky ] (2000)
