= List of Egyptian films of 1976 =

A list of films produced in Egypt in 1976. For an A-Z list of films currently on Wikipedia, see Category:Egyptian films.

Title	Director	Cast	Genre	Notes
Awdet El Ibn El Dal (Return of The Prodigal Son)	Youssef Chahine			
Azwag Ta'eshoon (Reckless Husbands)	Niazi Mostafa	Adel Emam, Madiha Kamel, Samir Ghanem, Safa Abu Al-Saud, Saeed Saleh, Ragaa El Geddawy	Comedy	
Al Asfour (The Sparrow)	Youssef Chahine	Mahmoud el-Meliguy, Mohsena Tawfik, Salah Mansour	Drama	
Gawaz Ala Al-Hawa (Marriage on Air)	Ahmed Tharwat	Nahed Sherif, Samir Ghanem, Adel Emam, Farid Shawki, Nabila El Sayed, Fifi Abdou	Comedy	
Malek El-Taks (Taxi King)	Yehia El Alami	Adel Emam, Samir Ghanem, Safa Abu Al-Saud	Comedy / romance	
Mamnou Fi Laylat El-Dokhla (Forbidden on Wedding Night)	Hasan El-Saifi	Soheir Ramzi, Adel Emam, Samir Ghanem, Nabila El Sayed, Mohamed Reda	Comedy / romance / fantasy	
Viva Zalata			Western / Comedy	
