= Sherihan =

Egyptian actress and singer

- شريهان
- Born: 6 December 1964 (age 61); Cairo, United Arab Republic
- Occupations: Actress, dancer
- Years active: 1970–2002; 2021–present
- Children: 2
- Website: www.sherihan.com

Sherihan Ahmed Abdel Fattah el Shalakani (Egyptian Arabic: شريهان أحمد عبد الفتاح الشلقانى, IPA: [ʃeɾiˈhæːn ʕæbdelfætˈtæːħ eʃʃælæˈʔæːni]; born 6 December 1964) is an Egyptian actress, singer and classically trained dancer.

== Biography ==
Sherihan started acting at the age of four. She is mostly known for Fawazir Ramadan. She retired in 2002 and came out of retirement in 2016. In 2021, she made her stage return after a 20-year hiatus from acting by starring in Coco Chanel play.

== Personal life ==
Sherihan is a half-sister of Omar Khorshid. She married Jordanian businessman Alaa Khawaja, with whom she has two daughters.

In 2001, she started sponsoring a Ma'idat ar-Rahman in Zamalek.

In 1989 or 1990, she had a serious accident in which she broke her back including the spine. In 2002, she suffered from salivary gland tumours which forced her to retire from acting.

Sherihan is also a popular Egyptian nationalist and was a main participant in the 2011 revolution demanding the removal of president Hosni Mubarak.

== Partial filmography ==
Film

Year	Title (Transliterated)	Title (Translated)	Title (Arabic)
1978	Otta 'Ala Nar	A Cat on Fire	قطة على نار
1982	Al Khobz Al Morr	The Bitter Bread	الخبز المر
1983	El Azra' W El Sha'r Al Abyad	The Virgin and the White Hair	العذراء والشعر والأبيض
1983	Darb El Labbana	The Milky Way	درب اللبانة
1983	El Motasharredan	The Homeless Two	المتشردان
1984	Rayya W Skina	Rayya and Skina	ريا وسكينة
1984	Min Fina El Harami	Who's the Thief Among Us	مين فينا الحرامي
1985	Khalli Balak Men 'A'lak	Watch Out For Your Mind	خلي بالك من عقلك
1986	Afas El Harim	Women Cage	قفص الحريم
1986	El Toq W El Eswerah	The Collar And The Bracelet	الطوق والأسورة
1986	Share' El Sad	The Dam Street	شارع السد
1986	Madam Shalata	Mrs. Shalata	مدام شلاطة
1988	El Mar'ah W El Qanun	The Woman and the Law	المرأة والقانون
1989	Fedihet El 'Omr	The Scandal of a Lifetime	فضيحة العمر
1989	El Morshed	The Guide	المرشد
1990	El 'Aqrab	The Scorpion	العقرب
1992	El Hobb W El Ro'b	Love and Terror	الحب والرعب
1993	Crystal	Crystal	كريستال
1994	Su' El Nesa	Women's Market	سوق النساء
1995	Yom Harr Geddan	A Very Hot Day	يوم حار جدا
1995	Keshsh Malek	Checkmate	كش ملك
1995	Mit Foll	Hundred Sambac (slang for Great)	ميت فل
1996	Gabr El Khawater	Condolences	جبر الخواطر
1997	Ara' El Balah	Date Wine	عرق البلح
1997	Lamada	Lamada	لماضة
2001	El Eshk W El Damm	Love and Blood	العشق والدم

=== Television ===
Year	Title (Transliterated)	Title (Translated)	Title (Arabic)	Director	Writer	Music composer	Choreographer
1985	Alf Lela W Lela	1001 Nights	ألف ليلة وليلة	Fahmy Abdel Hameed	Taher Abou Fasha	Moh. El Mogi	Hasan Afify
1986	Fawazir El Amthal	The Proverb Riddles	فوازير الأمثال	Fahmy Abdel Hameed	Taher Abou Fasha	Sayyed Mekkawi	Hasan Afify
1987	Hawl Al Alam	Around the World	حول العالم	Fahmy Abdel Hameed	Abdel Salam Amin	Helmy Bakr	Hasan Afify
1993	Hagat We Mehtagat	Things & Needs	حاجات ومحتاجات	Gamal Abdel Hameed	Sayyed Hegab	Moudy El Emam	Atef Awadh

=== Theater ===
Year	Title (Transliterated)	Title (Translated)	Title (Arabic)
1970s	Rob' Dastet Ashrar	Evil Dozen's Quarter	ربع دستة أشرار
1982	Sokk 'Ala Banatak	Lock Up Your Daughters	سك على بناتك
1984	Enta Horr	You Are Free	إنت حر
1984	El Mahzooz	Shaky	المهزوز
1986–1988	'Alashan Khater Eyunek	For Your Eyes' Sake	علشان خاطر عيونك
1991–1994	Share' Mohammed Ali	Mohammed Ali Street	شارع محمد علي
2021	Coco Chanel	Coco Chanel	كوكو شانيل
