= Fawazeer Ramadan =

Egyptian television show broadcast during Ramadan

- Genre: Variety show
- Story by: Riddles and dancing
- Presented by: Various
- Starring: Nelly and Sherihan
- Country of origin: Egypt
- Original language: Arabic
- No. of seasons: 45
- No. of episodes: 30

Original release
- Release: 1960 (radio); 1967 (television)

Fawazeer Ramadan (Egyptian Arabic: فوازير رمضان, alternately romanized as Fawazir) was an Egyptian radio and television show that was broadcast throughout the month of Ramadan. The show was most successful from 1975 to 1995, and it featured riddles, acting scenes and elaborately choreographed dance routines.

Viewers could solve the riddles at the end of the month to win prizes. The show was discontinued with the advent of larger selections of programming choices through services such as satellite television. There was also a feeling among conservatives that the program featured too much sensuality and dancing.

== History ==
The series began in 1961 as an Egyptian radio show titled As the Saying Goes, hosted by Amal Fahmi. In 1967, Fawazeer Ramadan was first broadcast on television. The word fawazeer (فوازير) means 'riddles'; every day during the month of Ramadan, an episode of the show was broadcast, ending with a riddle. The answers to the 30 riddles were not revealed until the end of Ramadan; viewers could win prizes by solving them.

Most of the content of Fawazeer Ramadan consisted of "fantastical" musical narratives from Arab history, which included elaborately choreographed dance routines reminiscent of Bollywood, with belly dancing and extravagant costumes. Episodes began with a dance sequence, followed by a riddle and dramatic scenes. The show also featured cartoon characters.

Fawazeer Ramadan became very popular, and a staple of Ramadan. Its most successful period lasted from 1975, when Nelly started appearing on the show, to 1995. The addition of Sherihan in 1985 further increased Fawazeer Ramadan's following. Sherihan's appearances, in particular, had a strong impact on the culture of the Arabic-speaking world. Many other prominent Egyptian actors and entertainers also appeared on the show, including Fouad el-Mohandes and the Tholathy Adwa'a El Masrah trio. Aspiring actresses found exposure participating in the dance sequences.

Partially due to criticism of Fawazeer Ramdan as being too secular—some specifically objected to its inclusion of sensuality and dancing—the show was discontinued. The proliferation of satellite television and the large amount of programming that it offered was also a factor in Fawazeer Ramadan's demise.

== Legacy ==
Despite criticism of Fawazeer Ramadan's "ridiculous visual effects and gaudy costumes", the show evokes nostalgia in many Muslims. The National opined that "TV binge-watching started at the end of the 1970s and the early 1980s ... when Fawazeer Ramadan began to appear on television."

Fawazeer Cassette, which debuted in 2022 and reprises skits and riddles from Fawazeer Ramadan, was described by Jordan News as a "nostalgic Ramadan tribute to a great era".

In the vein of Fawazeer Ramadan, Chevrolet Arabia has run advertisements which, instead of featuring cars, pose riddles to the viewer.
