= The Piper (1985 film) =

- الزمار
- Directed by: Atef El Tayeb
- Written by: Tennessee Williams (story based on Orpheus Descending); Rafīq Ṣabbān (screenplay and dialogue)
- Starring: Nour El-Sherif; Poussi; Mohsena Tawfik; Salah el-Saadani; Tawfik el-Deken
- Music by: Baligh Hamdi
- Production company: Rania Films
- Release date: January 1, 1985
- Running time: 120 minutes
- Country: Egypt
- Language: Arabic

The Piper (Arabic: الزمار, transliterated as El-Zamar) is an Egyptian film released on January 1, 1985. The film is directed by Atef El Tayeb, features a screenplay written by Rafīq Ṣabbān based on the play Orpheus Descending by Tennessee Williams, and stars Nour El-Sherif, Poussi, Salah el-Saadani, Mohsena Tawfik, Tawfik el-Deken and Naima al-Soghayar. Most of the film was shot in a village in Asyut Governorate in Upper Egypt.

== Cast ==
- Nour El-Sherif (Zammar Hassan)
- Poussi (Dawlat)
- Salah el-Saadani (Abdullah)
- Mohsena Tawfik (Maryam)
- Tawfik el-Deken (Jaber)
- Naima al-Soghayar (Nabawiya)
- Ahmad Badir (Allam Bey)
- Nahed Samir (Inayat)

== Synopsis ==
Zammar Hassan is a hunted young man. After the engineering student put on a play with his fellow students that did not please the authorities, he is on the run from village to village in Upper Egypt. Ultimately, his search for safety and stability takes him to the village of Al-Arraba, where he works in a grocery store.
