= Souad Zuhair =

Egyptian writer (1925 – 2000)

- Born: 1925
- Died: 2000 (aged 74–75)
- Burial place: El Rahmaniya
- Occupations: Writer; journalist
- Children: Lenin El-Ramly

Souad Zuhair (Arabic: سعاد زهير, born in 1925 – 2000) was an Egyptian writer who worked for the magazine Rose al-Yūsuf, which published many of her novels in serial format.

The daughter of an English teacher and journalist, she was born in El Rahmaniya. She completed secondary school in 1938 but was not able to complete university due to the financial impact of her father's death. She was put in prison for political activity in 1948.

== Personal life ==
She is the mother of Lenin El-Ramly.

== Selected work ==
- I 'tirafat imra 'a mustarjila ("Confessions of a masculine woman") novel (1960)
- Khitab ila rajul 'asri ("Letter to a modern man") novel (1994)
