= Viva Zalata =

- Directed by: Hassan Hafez
- Screenplay by: Anwar Abdallah
- Produced by: Fouad El Mohandes
- Starring: Fouad El Mohandes; Shwikar
- Cinematography: Wadid Serry
- Edited by: Kamal Abou El Ela
- Music by: Tarek Sharara
- Release date: 24 May 1976
- Running time: 120 minutes
- Country: Egypt
- Language: Arabic

Viva Zalata (Arabic: ڤيڤا زلاطا) is a 1976 Egyptian western comedy film directed by Hassan Hafez.

== Synopsis ==
Zalata immigrates to New Mexico, where he becomes a city hero and eventually mayor. After he is killed by Billy the Kid, his daughter Negma returns to Egypt to find her cousin Metwali for a revenge mission. A playboy and more lover than fighter, Metwali decides to accompany his cousin back to New Mexico. Learning a lot along the way, he avenges his uncle and marries Negma, returning to the Al-Hussainiya neighborhood of Cairo to settle down.

== Cast ==
- Fouad el-Mohandes as Zalata/Metwali
- Shwikar as Negma
- Samir Ghanem as Chief Yellow Cloud
- Tawfik el-Deken as wagon train leader
- Nabila El Sayed as saloon owner
- Hassan Mustafa as the Sheriff
- Mahmoud Morsi
- Gamal Ismail as General Batista
- Salama Elias as casino owner
- Nabil Al-Hagrasi as respresentative of the Ministry of Tourism
- Osama Abbas as United States government representative
- Nabil Badr as Mexican government representative
- Zouzou Shakib as Zainab al-Alameh
- Seif Allah Mokhtar as follower of Zalata
- Helmi Halali as wagon train member
- Hassan Abdin as King Size
- Ahmed Nabil as follower of Zalata
- Mohamed Taha as friend of Metwali
- Ahmed Shokry
- Mahmoud Abu Zeid as Qaza’a, the sheriff's deputy
- Zakariya Mowafi as Hani, the saloon owner's son
- Izz al-din Islam as undertaker
- Almontaser Bellah as follower of Zalata
- Samiha Mohamed as shopkeeper's wife
- Sayed Mounir
- Hussein Fahmy as Billy the Kid
- El-Toukhy Tawfiq as wagon train member
- Mohamed Sobhi

== See also ==
- Viva Zapata
- Cinema of Egypt
- Lists of Egyptian films
- List of Egyptian films of the 1970s
- List of Egyptian films of 1976
