= Agazat Gharam =

- Directed by: Mahmoud Zulfikar
- Written by: Mahmoud Farid
- Screenplay by: Mohamed Abu Youssef; Farouk Sabry
- Produced by: Saad Shanab
- Starring: Fouad El Mohandes; Shwikar
- Cinematography: Mahmoud Nasr
- Music by: Mounir Mourad
- Production company: Ihab El Leithy Films
- Distributed by: Ihab El Leithy Films
- Release date: September 11, 1967
- Running time: 105 minutes
- Country: Egypt
- Language: Egyptian Arabic

Agazat Gharam (Arabic: إجازة غرام, translit: Agazet Gharam, English: Love Vacation) is a 1967 Egyptian comedy film directed by Mahmoud Zulfikar.

== Synopsis ==
Magdy works as an engineer at the High Dam, in Aswan and is taking a leave of absence from work to travel to Cairo and meet his family again. He plans to spend more time with his wife, Laila, who works as a doctor in a hospital, but she is busy for him with her work all the time. This makes him attracted, at this period, to talk to his neighbor Ilham. He visits her all the time in her apartment, taking advantage of her husband's travel, and things develop between them rapidly.

== Crew ==
- Director: Mahmoud Zulfikar
- Writer: Mahmoud Farid
- Screenplay: Mohamed Abu Youssef and Farouk Sabry
- Producer: Saad Shanab
- Studio: Ihab El Leithy Films
- Distributor: Ihab El Leithy Films
- Music: Mounir Mourad
- Cinematography: Mahmoud Nasr

== Primary cast ==
- Fouad El-Mohandes as Magdy Saleh
- Shwikar as Layla
- Nagwa Fouad as Ilham
- Salah Nazmi as Sabri
- Naima Wasfi as Zahira Abdel Khaleq
- Hassan Mustafa as Ahmed
- Mohamed Shawky as the janitor
- Ragaa Sadiq as Adela
