= The Collar and the Bracelet =

1986 film directed by Khairy Beshara

- Directed by: Khairy Beshara
- Starring: Ezzat El Alaili
- Release dates: June 7, 1986
- Running time: +120 minutes
- Country: Egypt
- Language: Arabic

The Collar and the Bracelet, or الطوق والسوار, is a 1986 Arabic dramatic thriller film directed by Khairy Beshara, written by Beshara and Yehia Azmi, and starring Sherihan, Abdullah Mahmoud, Ahmed Abdelaziz, Ahmed Bedir, Ezzat El-Alaili, Fardous Abdel Hamid, Hanan Youssef and Mohamed Mounir.

== Plot ==
Based on the late Egyptian writer Yehia Azmi Tahir Abdallah's two literary classics, the film follows three women in three generations of an upper Egyptian family after the 1952 revolution. It is emphasized that President Gamal Abdel Nasser has not improved the economy, and the revolution changed nothing. Hzeena and Fahima, a mother and daughter, must deal with the man of the house (Hzeena's husband and Fahima's father) having fallen ill and barely able to move. They find themselves stuck in a situation where the only person who can help them, cannot, as he - Hzeena's brother and Fahima's uncle - moved to Palestine, years earlier. As their circumstances continue to worsen, Fahima is eventually forcefully wed to a welder who ends up doing nothing to help, leaving Hzeena and Fahima hungry.

Despite the marriage failing, as the welder is impotent, Fahima gives birth to a baby girl, before dying. She is named Farhana, and she takes her mother's place, as she grows older, even literally, as Hzeena, now a grandmother, sees her as her daughter rather than rightfully her granddaughter. Farhana secretly and accidentally becomes pregnant out of wedlock, and Hzeena's brother returns at last, from Palestine. Farhana is brutally murdered as a punishment, by her cousin, Saad, once her secret is revealed. The punishment is ordered by her grandmother, as she becomes the executioner in an Egyptian world that is ruled by patriarchal law in which everyone, even women, must force.

The film proves that it is not the people who are good or evil, but rather the immoral social norms/traditions and horrible economy are what drives horrible outcomes like this.

== Cast ==
- Sherihan - Farhana
- Ezzat El-Alaili - Hzeena's husband and Fahima's father, as well as Hzeena's brother and Fahima's uncle
- Fardous Abdel Hamid - Hzeena
- Ahmed Abdelaziz
- Ahmed Bedir
- Hanan Youssef - Fahima
- Abdalla Mahmoud - Saad
- Mohamed Mounir
