= El Rahmaniya =

El Rahmaniya الرحمانية
- City
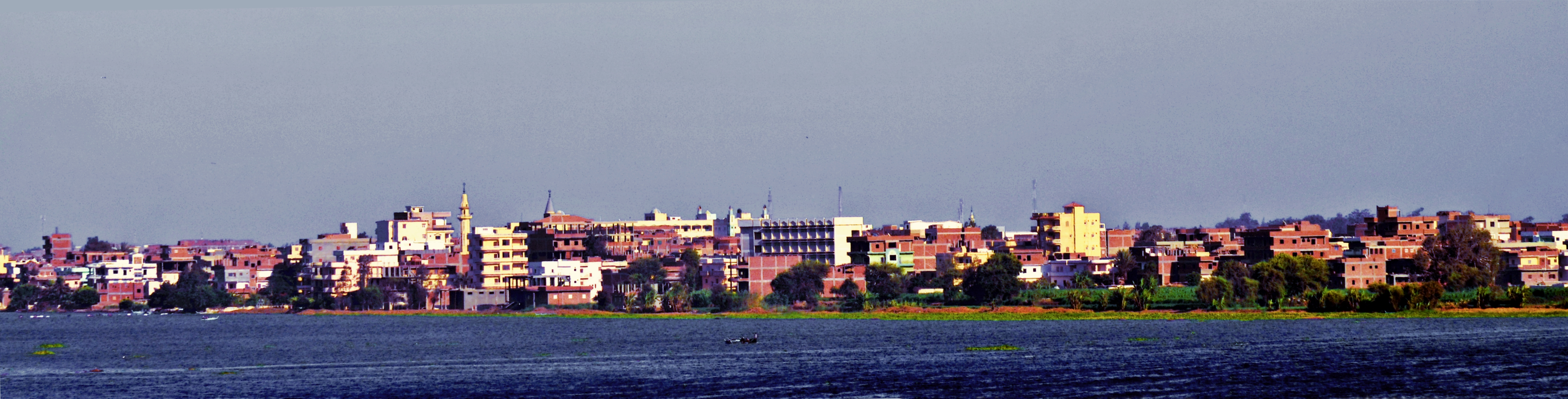
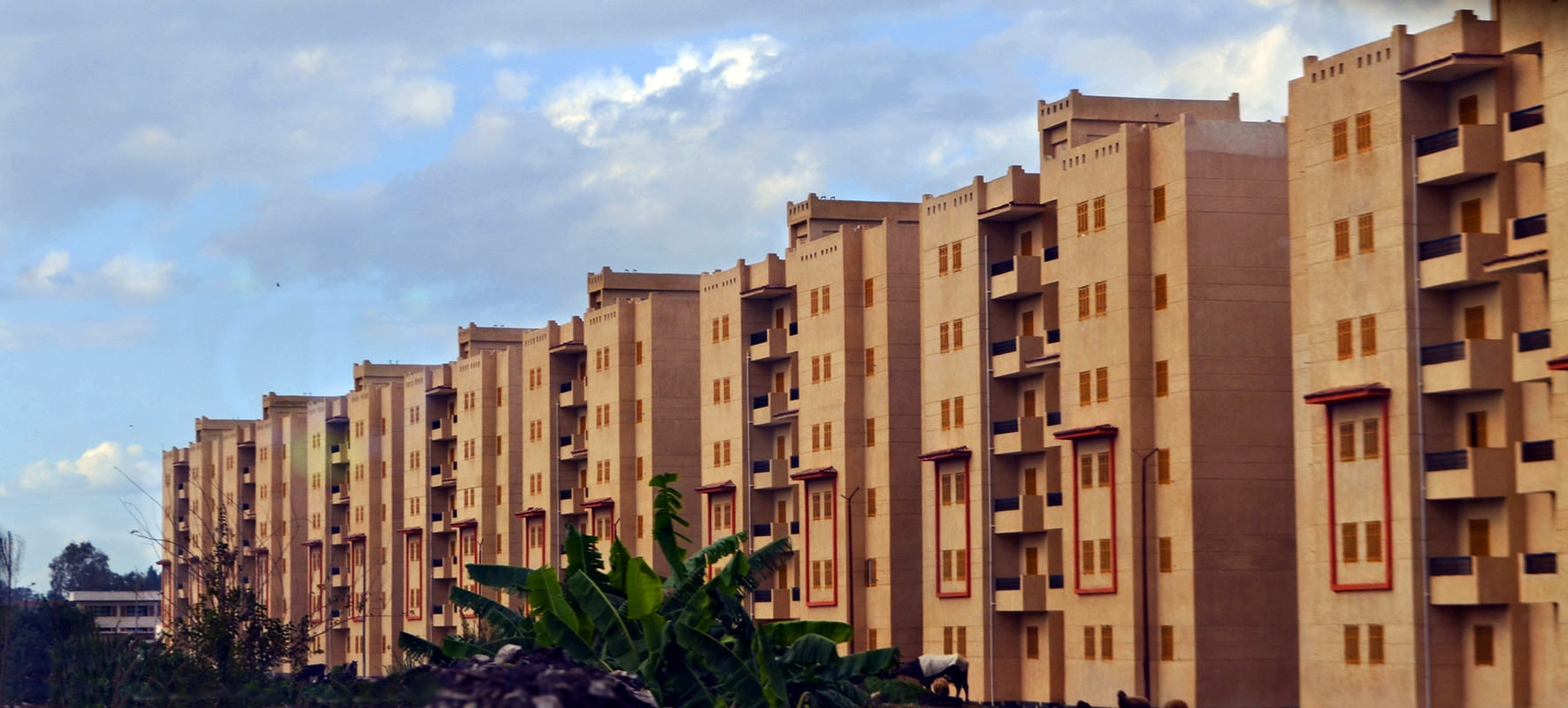
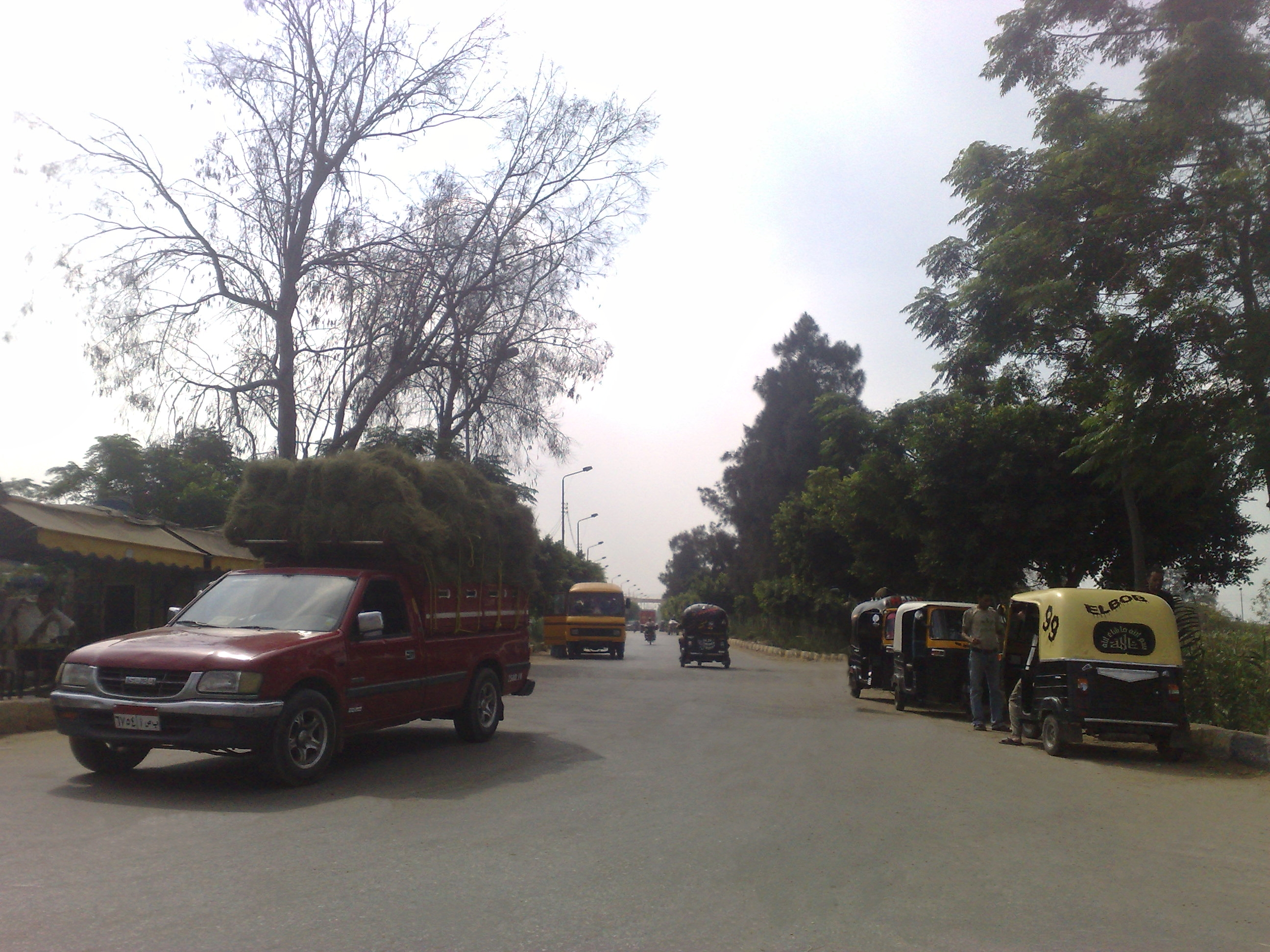
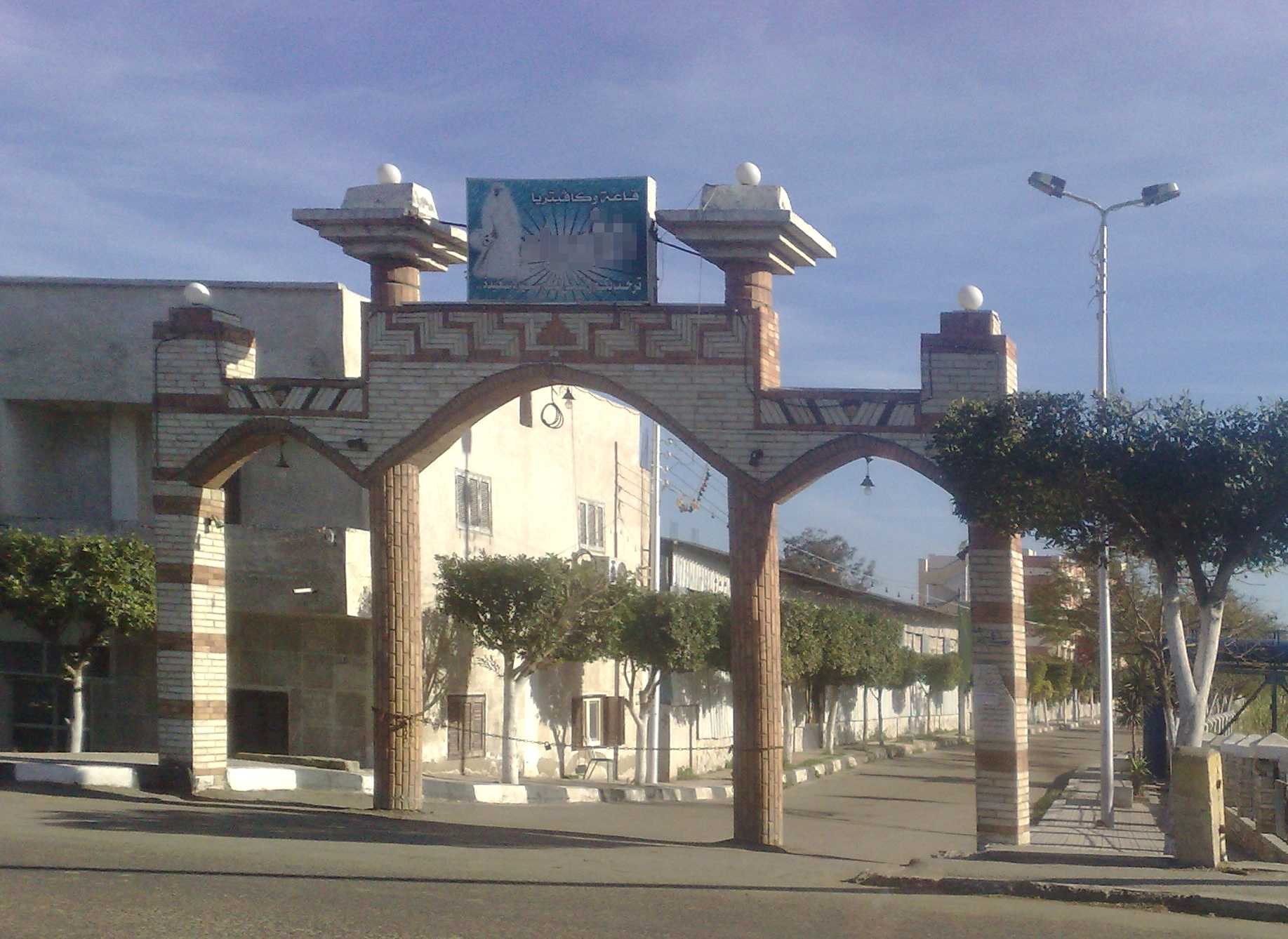
- Clockwise from top: Rahmaniya on Nile, Rahmaniya homes, Rahmaniya main gate, Desouk-Shubrakhit Road

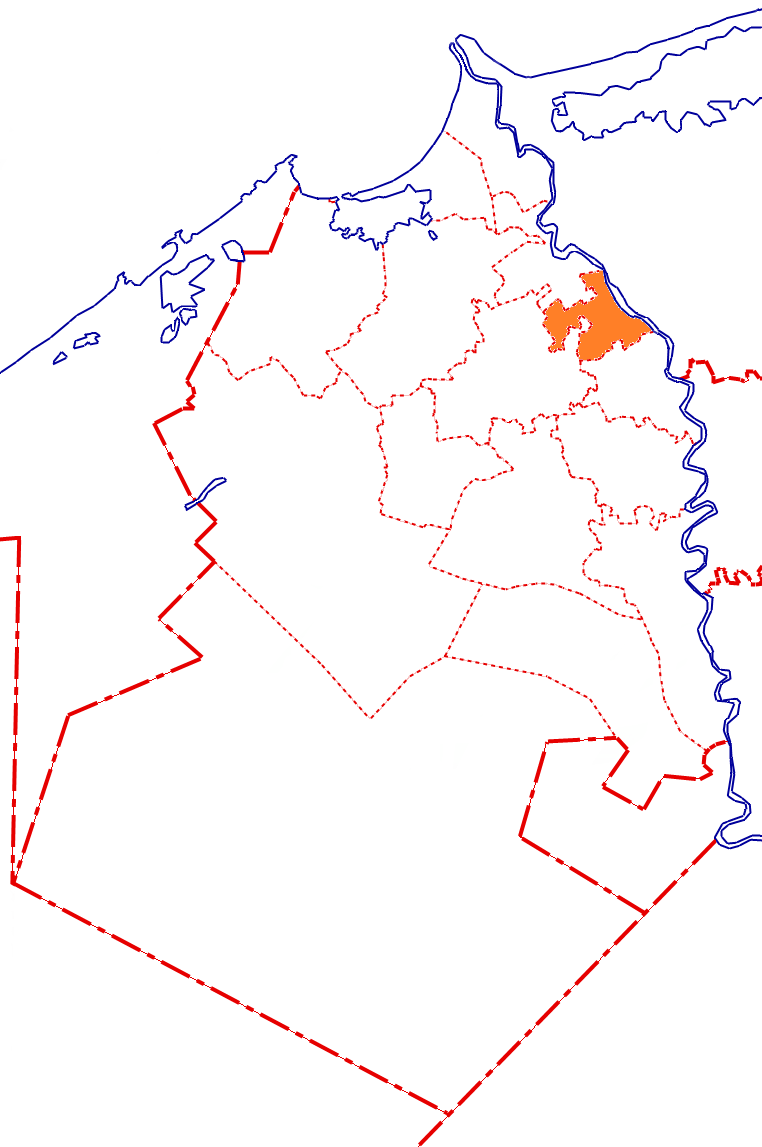
- Location in Beheira Governorate

- Location in Egypt El Rahmaniya (Egypt)
- Coordinates: 31.106155°N 30.633731°E
- Country: Egypt
- Governorate: Beheira

Population (2023)
  - Total: 176,315
  - Urban: 45,760
  - Rural: 130,555
- Time zone: UTC+2 (EET)
  - Summer (DST): UTC+3 (EEST)

El Rahmaniya (Arabic: الرحمانية, also spelled as Rahmanieh) is a city and markaz in Beheira Governorate, Egypt.

== History ==
The old name of the city is Mahallet Abd al-Rahman (Arabic: محلة عبد الرحمن).

After the arrival of the French invasion to the west of Alexandria on July 2, 1798 AD, they marched into the city and occupied it on that day. After that, Napoleon took a march on Cairo through Damanhur, where he was able to occupy the city of Rosetta on 6 July and reached Rahmaniya, a village on the Nile. In the meantime, the Mamluks were preparing an army to confront the French armies, led by Murad Bey.

However, the Mamluk army was defeated and was forced to retreat. Murad Bey returned to Cairo and met both the French and Mamluk army at another time in the Battle of the Pyramids, where Napoleon Bonaparte defeated Murad Bey’s army again in this decisive battle on July 21, 1798.

== Notable people ==
- Souad Zuhair
