= Ma'idat ar-Rahman =

Community tradition in Egypt and Arabia

Māʾidat ar-Raḥmān (Arabic: مائدة الرحمن, lit. 'The Table of the Merciful') is an Islamic tradition in which collective place settings with food and drink are provided for breaking the fast during Ramadan. It caters to the poor and disadvantaged fasters who might not be able to afford an iftar meal at home. It has become a common practice in many Islamic and Arab countries, especially in Egypt.

Sometimes these tables are sponsored by celebrities such as Sherihan, Sherine Abdel Wahab, and Ruby.

== History ==
Some historians date the origin of the tradition in Egypt to the Tulunid period (868–905), with Ahmad ibn Tulun asking wealthy merchants and members of the nobility to provide tables of sustenance for the poor during the holy month.

Other sources indicate that the tradition emerged at the time of the Fatimid dynasty (909–1171), with meals hosted by rulers, leaders, merchants, and nobility and great amounts of sugar and flour provided by the Fatimid palace to make Ramadan sweets such as kunafa and qatayif.

In 2025, Al-Ahram reported an instance of a Christian man in Hurghada who hosts a Māʾidat Raḥmān during Ramadan, celebrating it as an example of Christian-Muslim coexistence in Egypt.
