= Water carrier =

Profession that existed before centralized water supply systems

Water carrier (also water seller) is a profession that existed before the advent of centralized water supply systems. A water carrier collected water from a source (a river, a well, water pumps, etc.) and transported or carried containers with water to people's homes. After the construction of pipe networks, the profession of water carrier became unnecessary and disappeared.

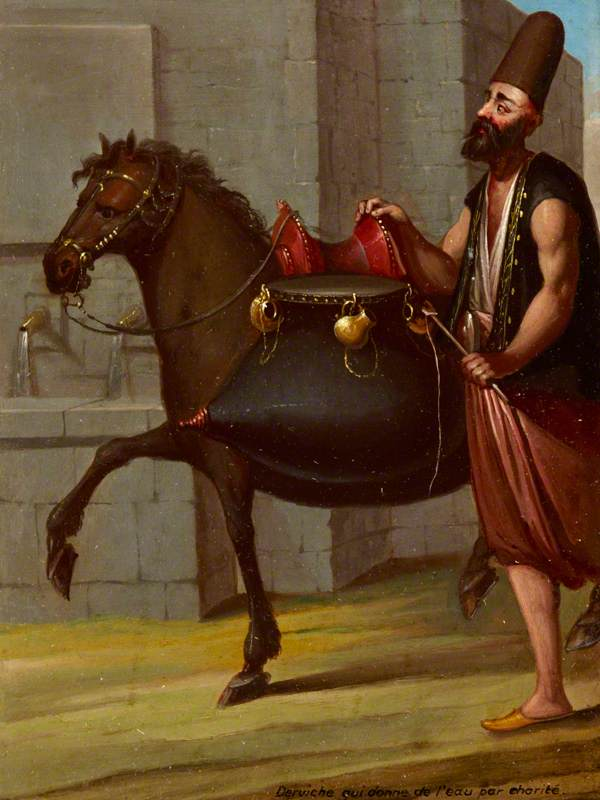
Mevlevi dervish pulling a horse carrying water

In late Qing dynasty Chengdu, there were over one thousand people who worked as water carriers. They not only performed their official duties, but also helped the elderly and sick who could not take care of themselves with housework. In the 1940s, Chengdu water carriers still went barefoot to show that they went deep into the river to collect the purest water.

Between the 16th and 19th centuries in Ottoman Turkey, dervishes called saka or sebiljee distributed water for charitable purposes. Among them were dervishes who sympathized with the Mevlevi order.

In Paris, not all houses had running water up to the 20th century, with some supplied by public fountains. The poor carried water from there themselves; those who could afford it paid the water carrier.

== Gallery ==
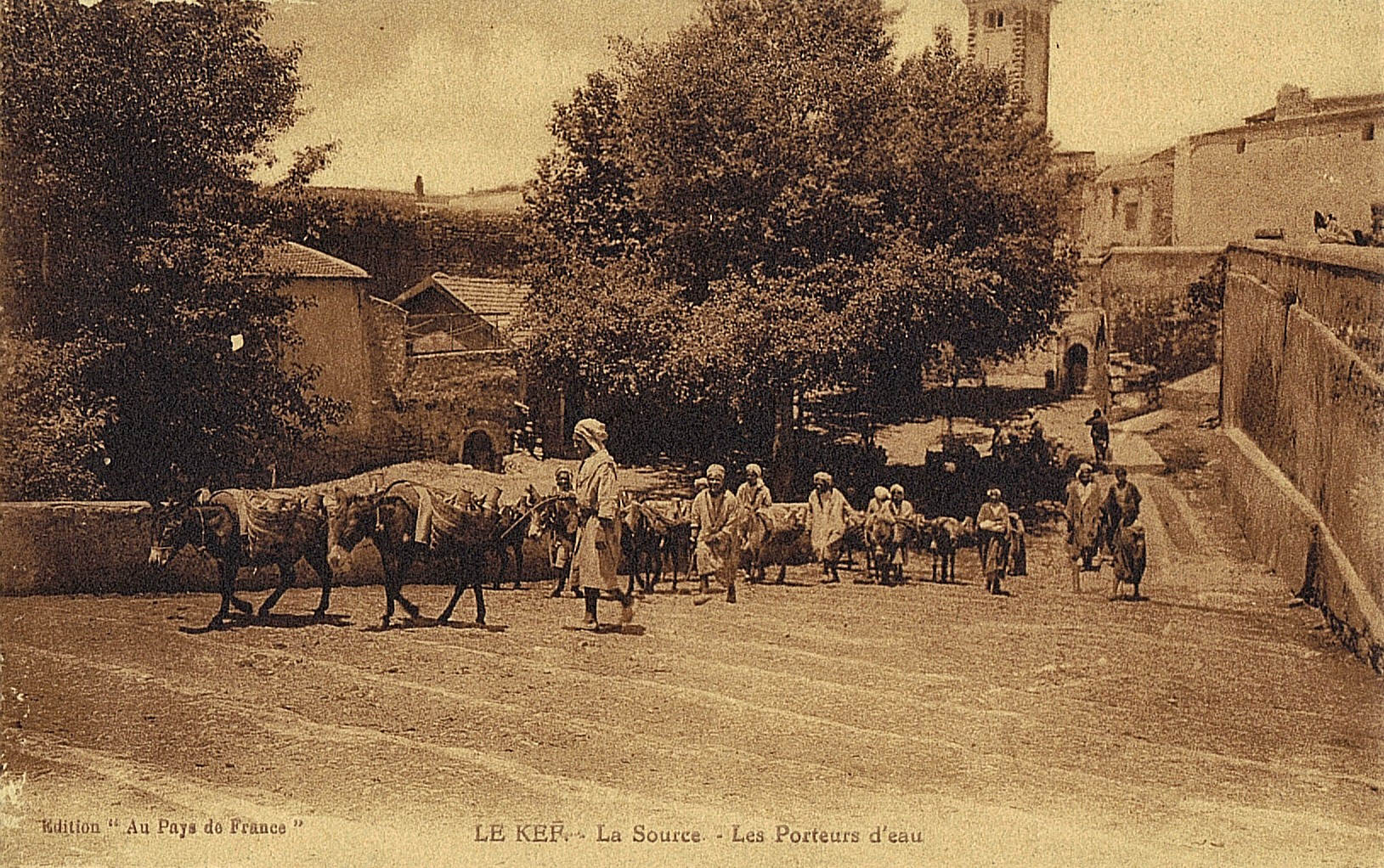
Tunisia, early 20th century

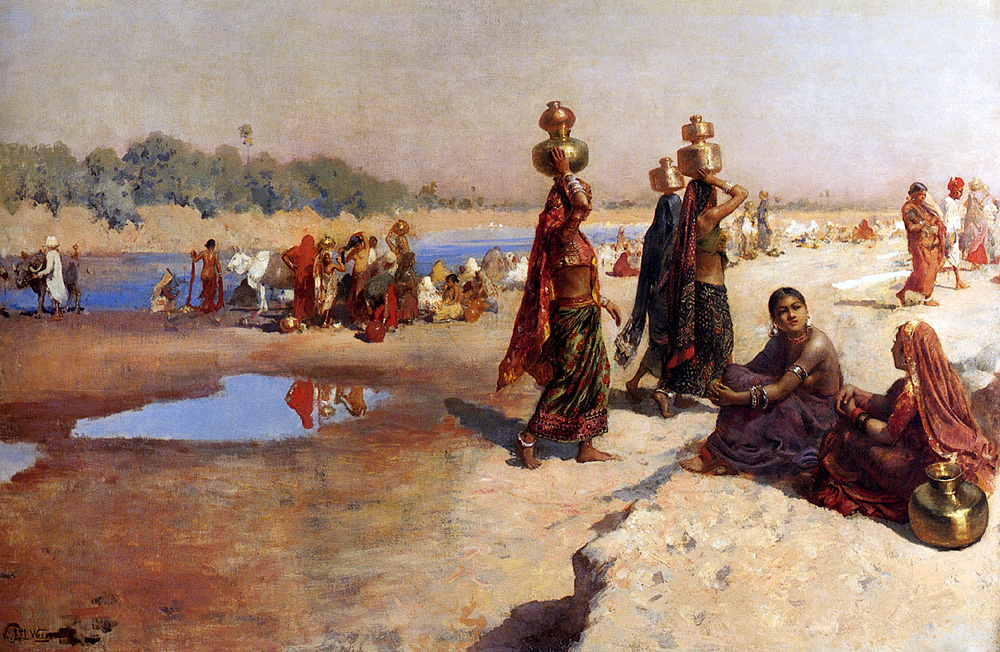
Water carriers on the Ganges, early 20th century

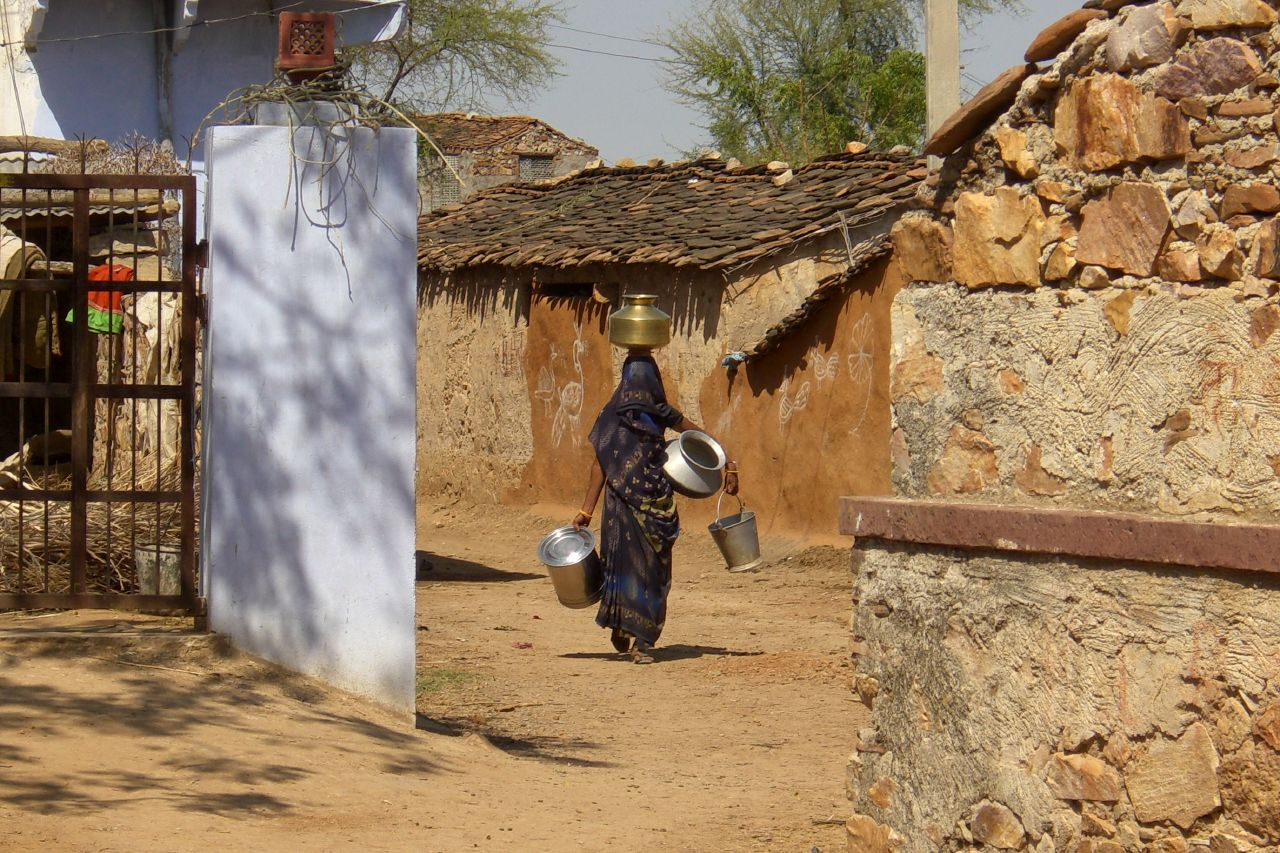
Rajasthan in 2006

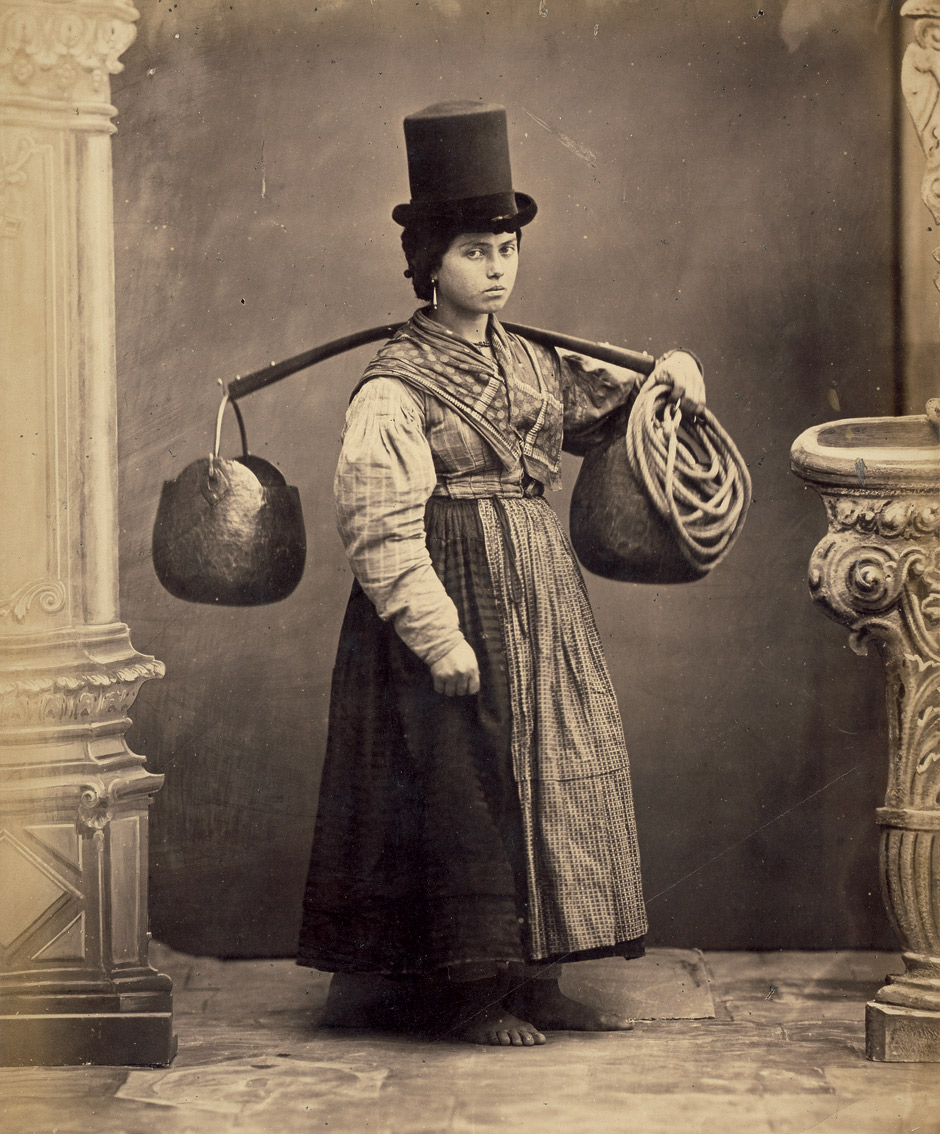
Venice, 19th century

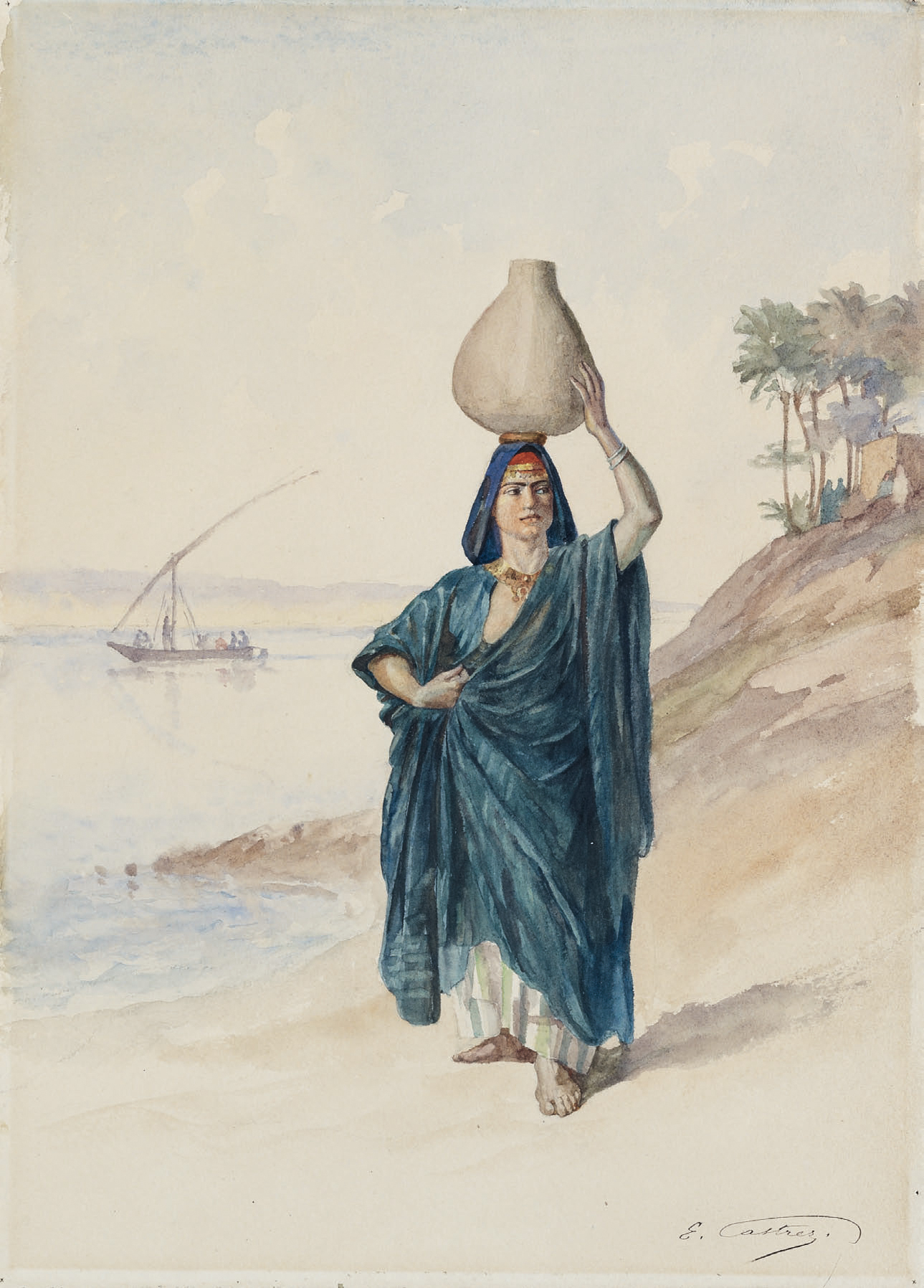
Water carrier on the banks of the Nile, early 20th century

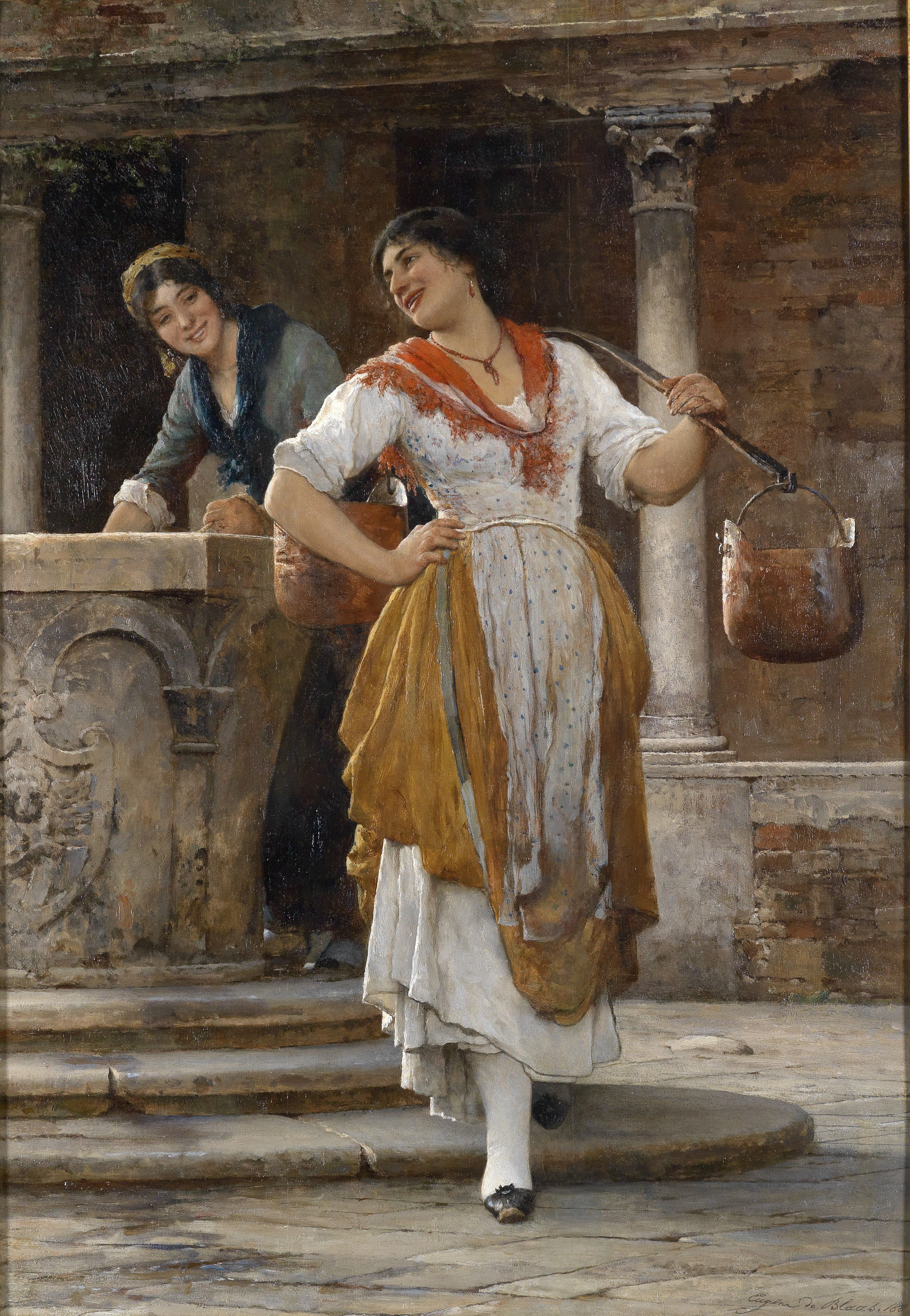
The Water Carrier, by Eugene de Blaas (1887)

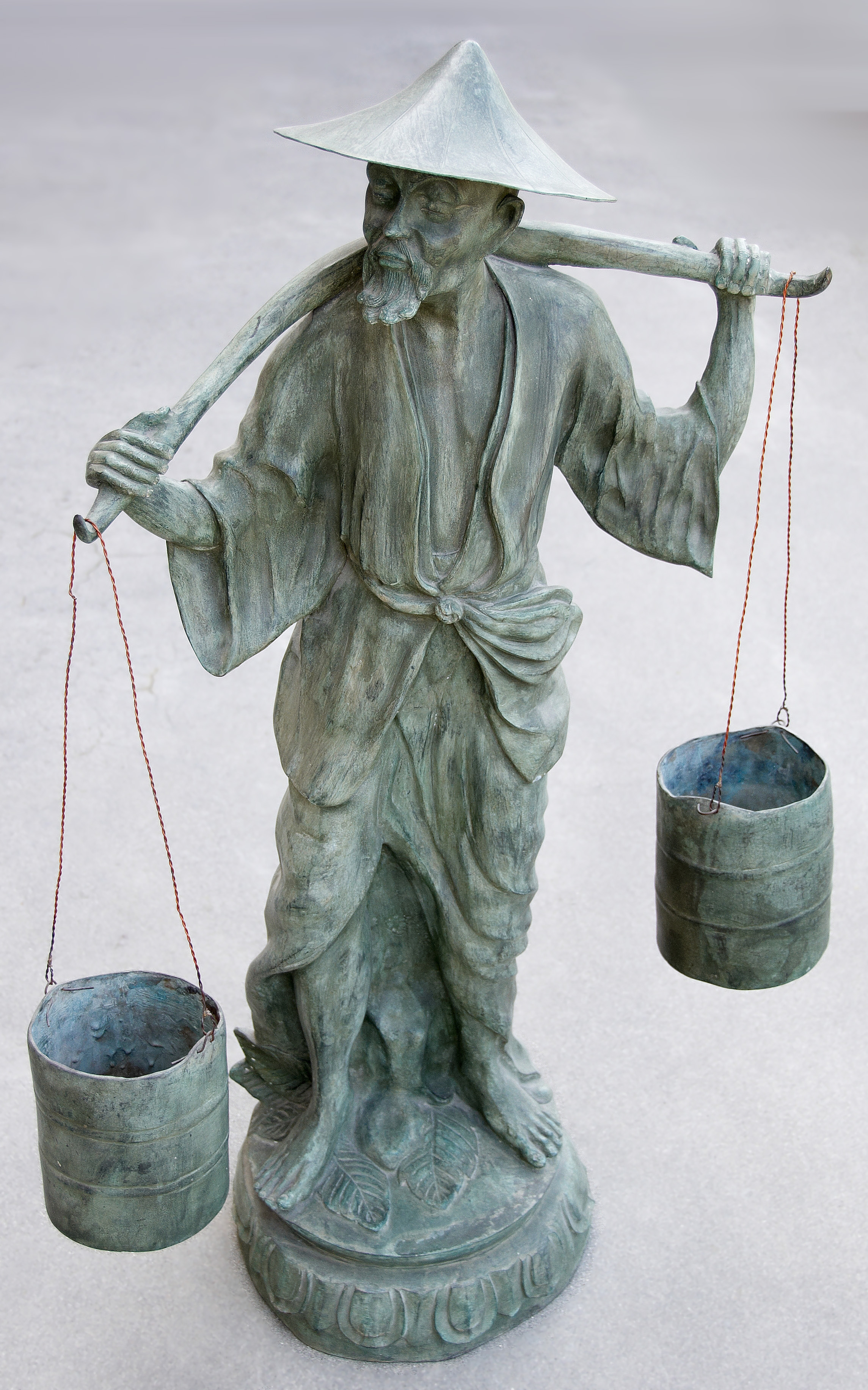
Statue of a water carrier with a pikolan (yoke), China

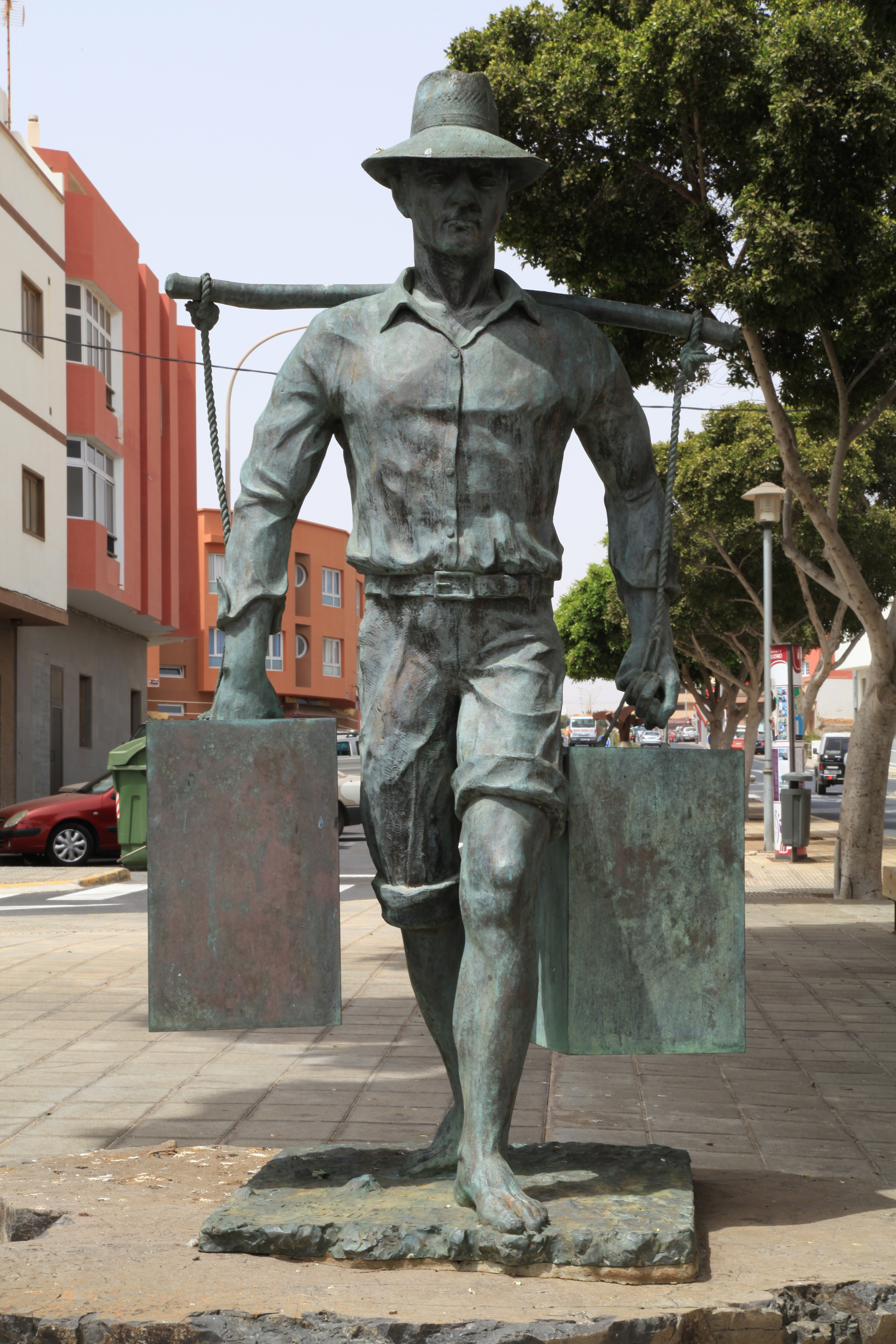
El Aguador (The Water Carrier) by Emiliano G. Hernández. Avenida de Juan de Bethencourt and Calle Leon Y Castillo in Puerto del Rosario, Fuerteventura, Canary Islands

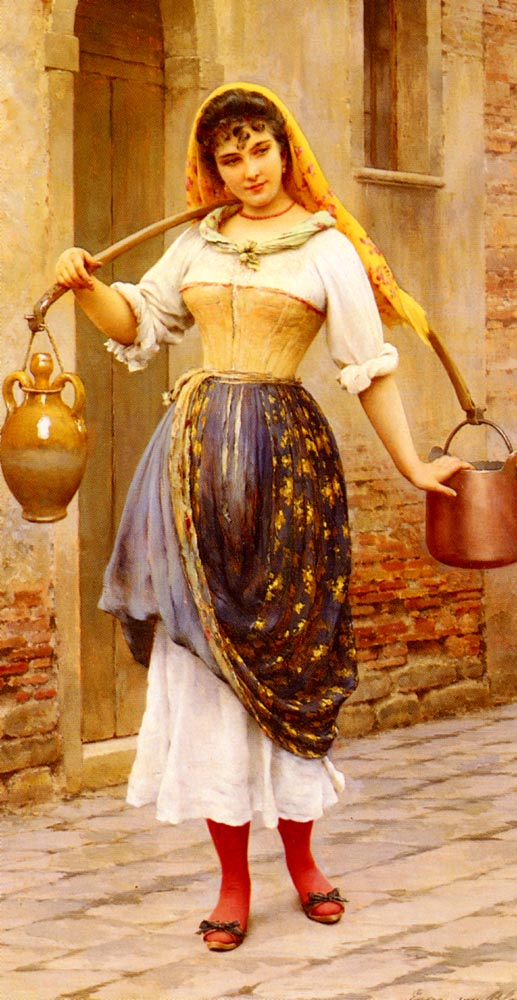
Le Travail, by Eugene de Blaas (c. 1900)

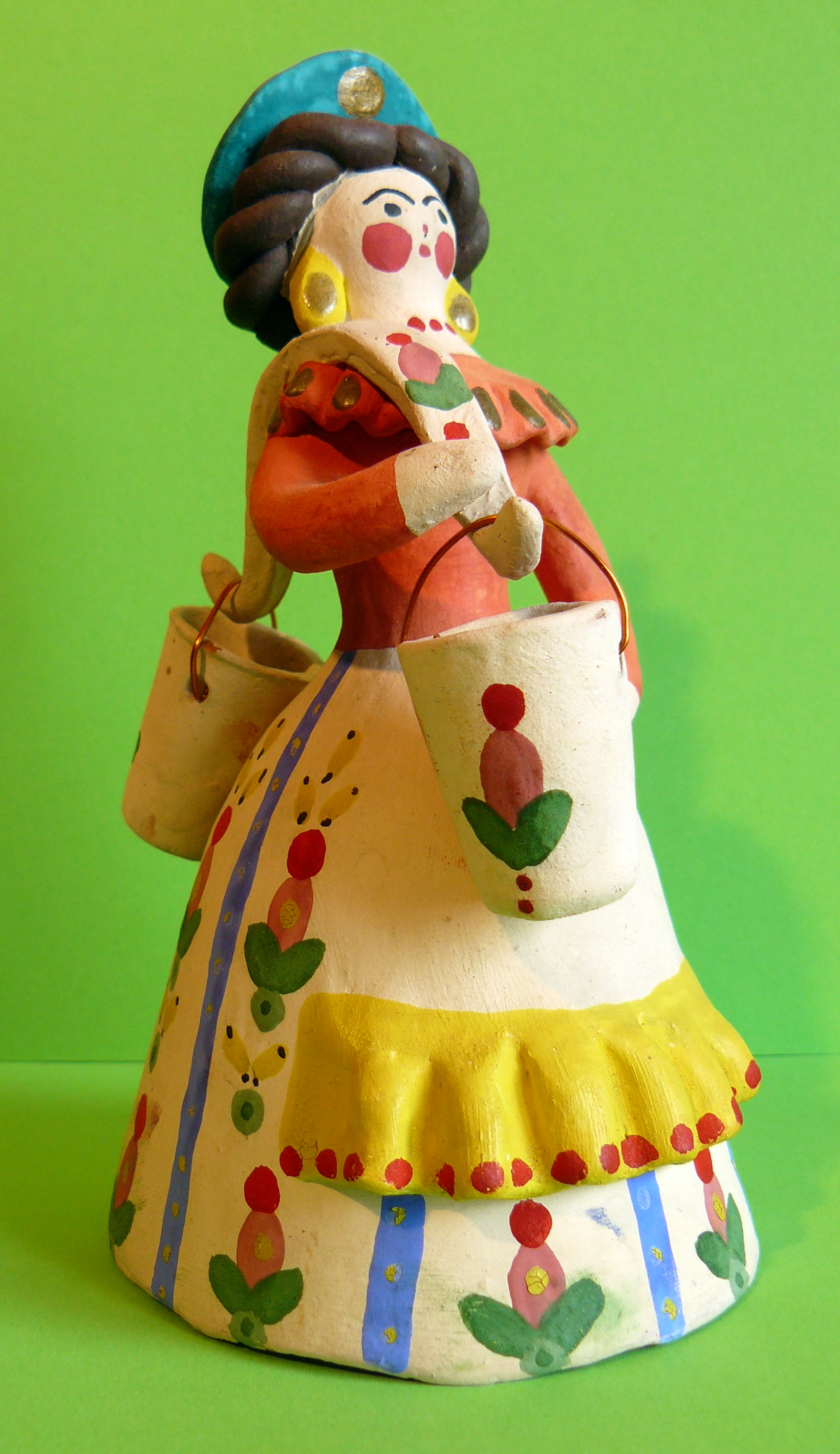
Vodonoska, the Water Carrier. Russian Dymkovo painted figurine in clay

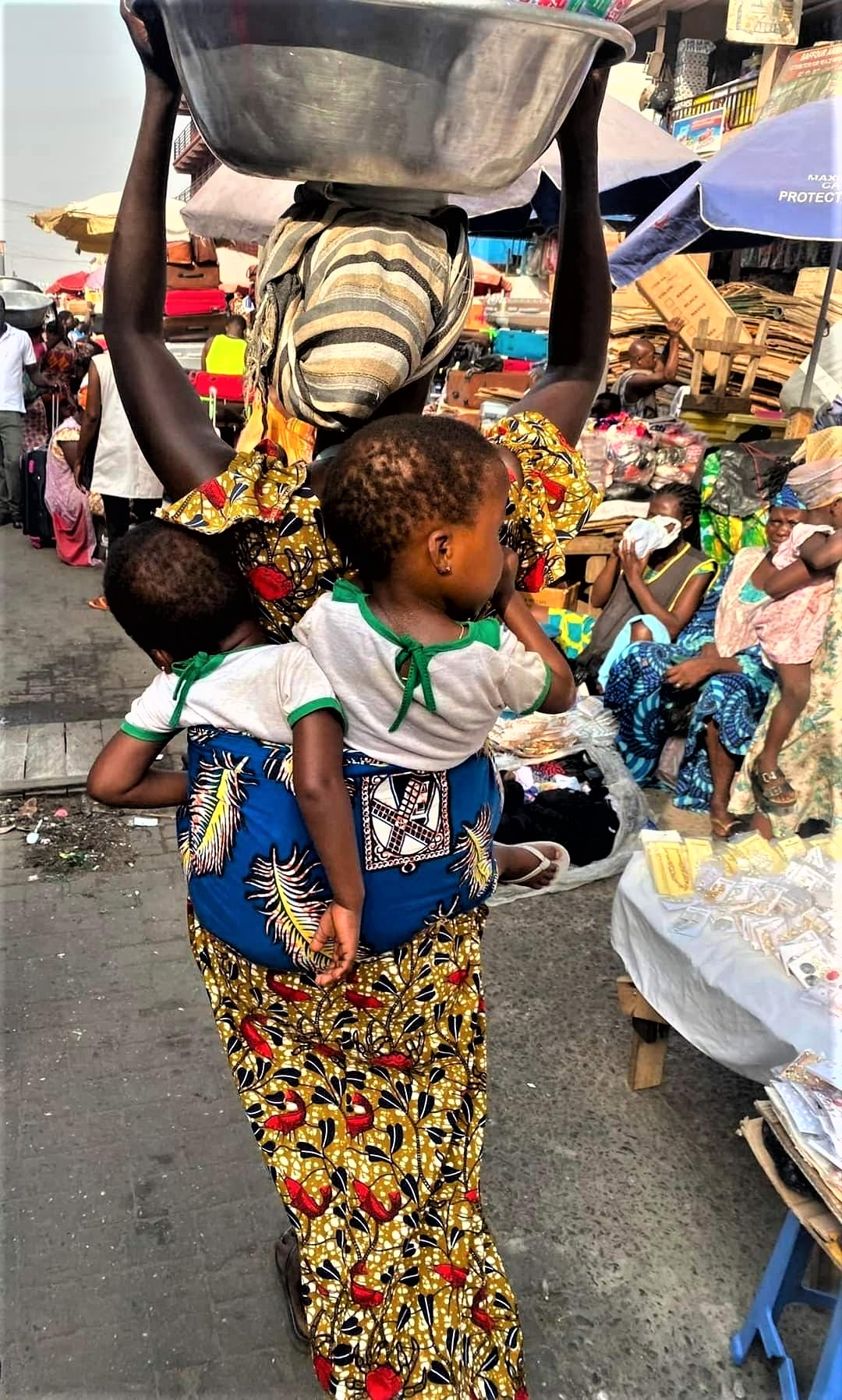
A woman selling water at Makola, Ghana

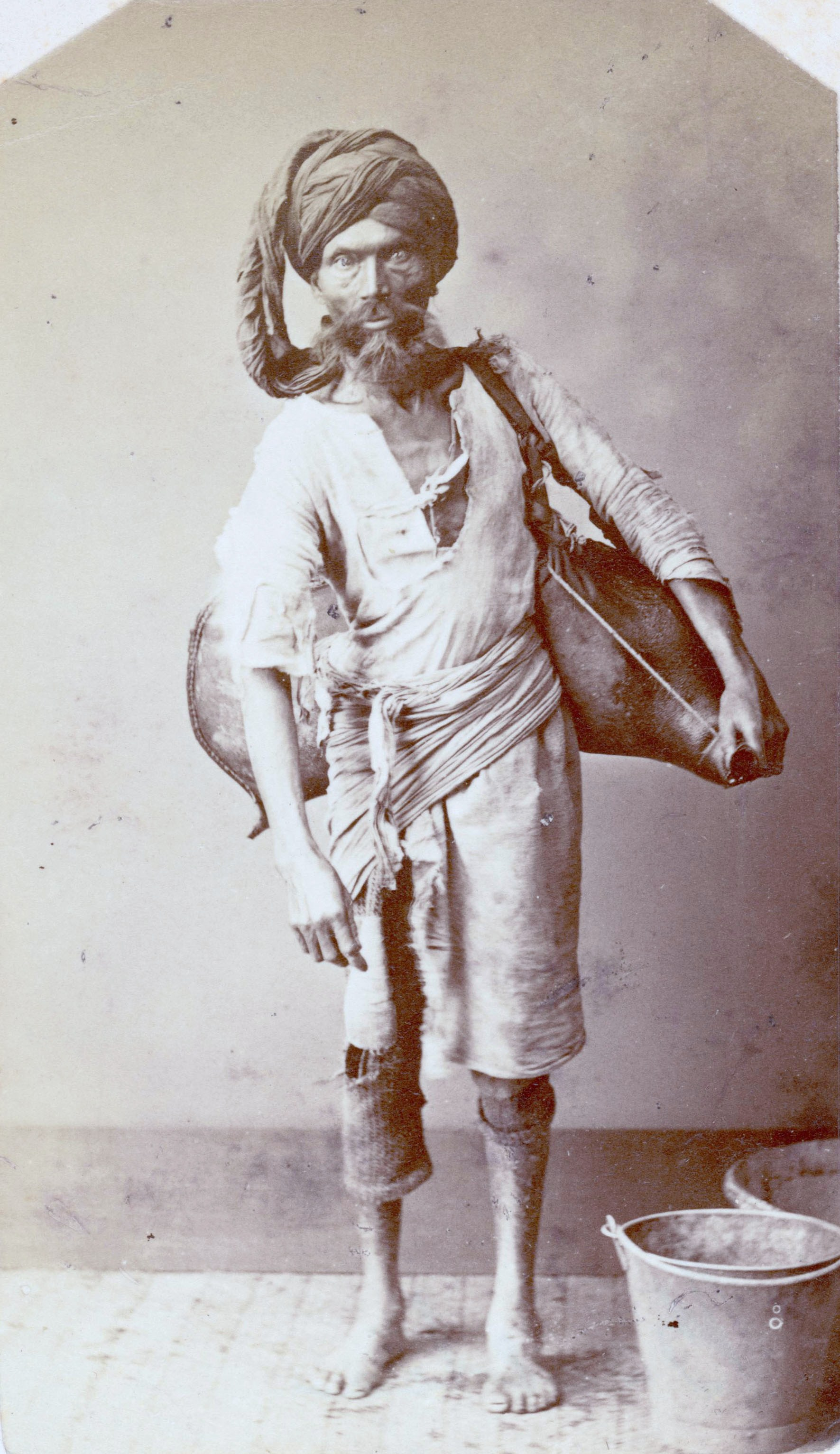
Water Carrier Bhisti in India

== See also ==
- Bhishti
- Aquarius (astrology)
- Habibullah Kalakani, known as Son of the water carrier.
- Les deux journées, an 1800 opera by Luigi Cherubini also known as The Water Carrier.
- List of obsolete occupations
- The Water-Carrier is Dead, a 1977 Egyptian film

== Bibliography ==
- Rakimov, R.R. (2009). Музей антропологии и этнографии им. Петра Великого (Кунсткамера). Центральная Азия: традиция в условиях перемен. Vol. v. 2. Nauka. p. 365. ISBN 9785020252318.
- Angelakis, A.N.; Mays, L.W.; Koutsoyiannis, D. (2012). Evolution of Water Supply Through the Millennia. IWA Publishing. p. 209. ISBN 9781843395409.
- Wang, Di (2003). Street Culture in Chengdu: Public Space, Urban Commoners, and Local Politics, 1870-1930. Stanford University Press. pp. 75–76. ISBN 9780804747783.
- Duru, Rıza (2024). "Mevlevi Watercarriers".
