= Shwikar =

Egyptian actress (1936–2020)

- شويكار
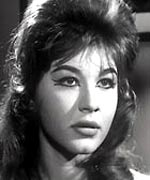
- Born: Shwikar Ibrahim; 4 November 1938; Alexandria, Egypt
- Died: 14 August 2020 (aged 81); Cairo, Egypt
- Occupation: Actress
- Years active: 1961–2010
- Notable work: Agazet Gharam
- Spouses: Hassan Nafie; Fouad el-Mohandes (m. 1963; div. 1980); Medhat Yussef
- Children: 1

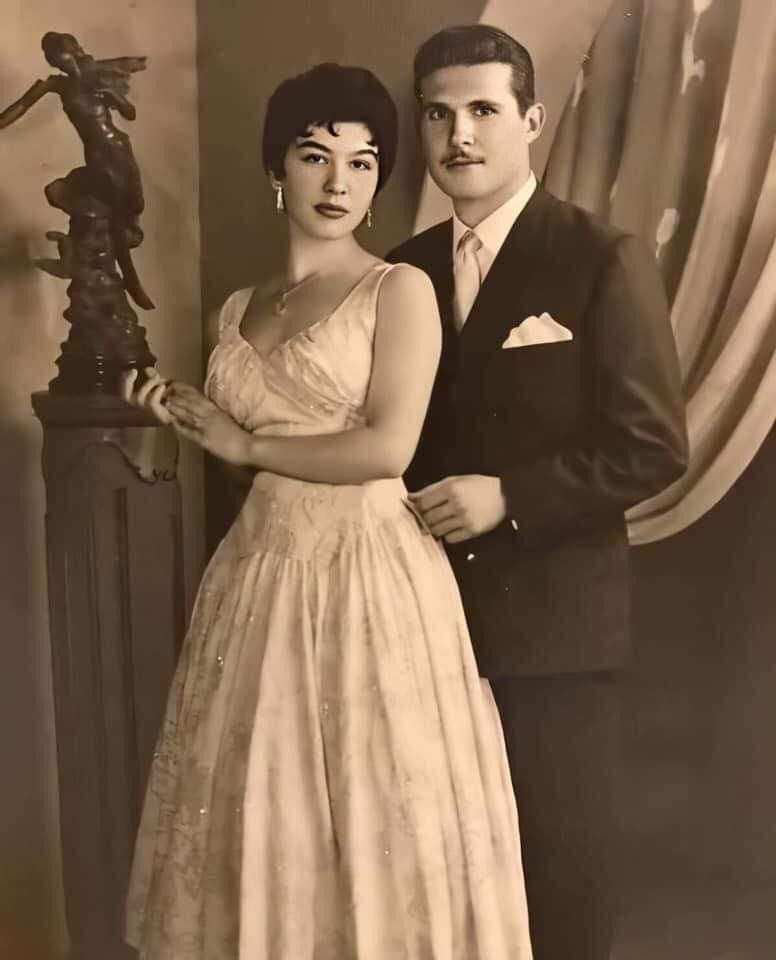
Shwikar and her first husband

Shwikar Ibrahim (Arabic: شويكار [ʃɪwiˈkɑːr]; 4 November 1938 – 14 August 2020) was an Egyptian actress and comedian. She started her career in Alexandria in some tragedic roles before she was discovered by the Egyptian film director Fateen Abdul Wahab to work as a comedian in TV, cinema and theatres.

== Biography ==
Born on 4 November 1938, in Alexandria, Egypt. An Egyptian She started her acting career in 1960, and became popular in the 1960s, especially in the works she starred alongside Fouad El Mohandes. Her notable films in the 1960s include Agazat Gharam (1967), The Most Dangerous Man in the World (1967), Shanbo in the Trap (1968), and Land of Hypocrisy (1968).

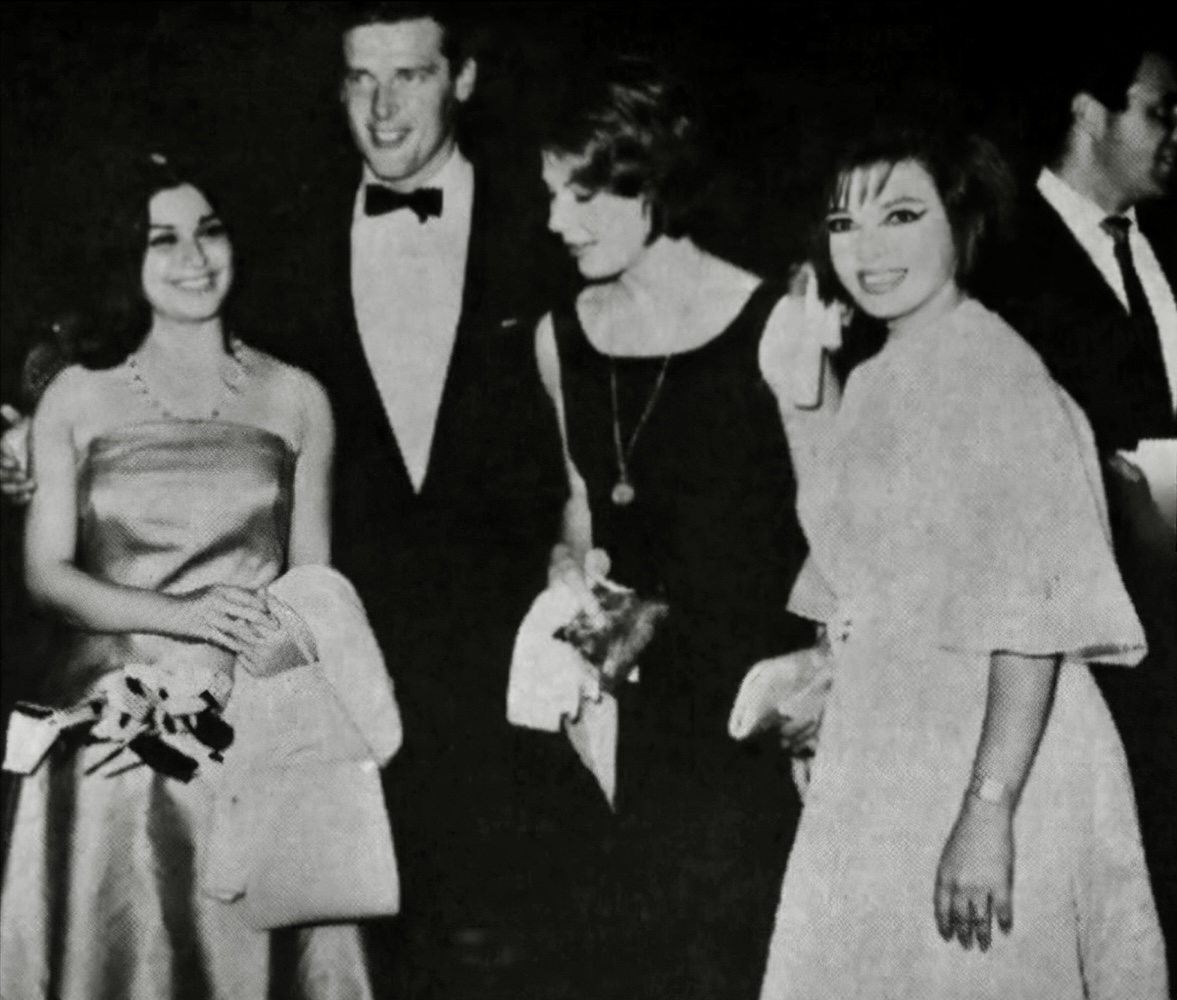
Shwikar (second from right) with Soad Hosny, Roger Moore and Sharifa Fadel at the Alexandria Television Festival, 1963

She also starred in plays, including Me, Him and Her, Eve at 12, My Fair Lady, Where Am I and Where Are You? and Keep Your Daughters Locked In. Since the early 1970s, she has focused more on her film work, and has since presented several films, including Karnak (1975), Viva Zalata (1976), Al-Sakka Mat (1977), The Sad Night Bird (1977), and America Shika Bika (1992). She also appeared in many television works that varied between comedy and tragedy, including A Woman from the Time of Love, Ladies of Garden City, A Girl from Shubra and Men's Talk.

Shwikar was married three times, first to Hassan Nafie, with whom she had one daughter. Her second husband was actor Fouad el-Mohandes. And her third husband was screenwriter Medhat Yussef. She died on 14 August 2020 in Cairo, aged 81.

== Selected filmography ==
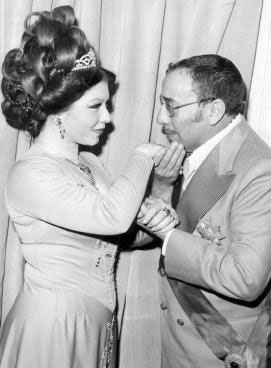
Shwikar with her husband and fellow actor Fouad el-Mohandes in 1963.

- Ana W Howwa W Heyya (I, He And She)
- Enta Elli Atalt Papaya (You're Who killed My Daddy)
- Gharam 'Ala El Tari' El Zera'i ( Love In Agricultural Road)
- Ard El Nefaq (Land Of Hypocrisy)
- Agaza B El Afya (Vacation By Force)
- Donya El Banat (Girls'World)
- El Hasna' W El Talabah (Belle And Students)
- Agazet Gharam (Love Vacation)
- Kashf El Mastur ( Revealed Hidden)
- Zaman El Mamnu' ( Forbidden Time)
- El Nassab W El Kalb (The Swindler And The Dog)
- El Kammashah ( The Pincers)
- El Ersh (The Shark)
- Ragol Le Haza Al Zaman (A Man For This Time)
- Ebnati W Al Ze'ab (My Daughter And The Wolves)
- Sanawat Al Khatar (Years Of Danger)
- El 'Arbagi (The Coachman)
- Shabab Yarkos Fawk Al Nar (Youth Dancing Over Fire)
- El Mar'ah Heya El Mar'ah (The Woman Is The Woman )
- Fatah Tabhath 'An El Hob ( A Girl Looking For Love)
- Ta'er El Layl El Hazin (The Sad Bird Of Night)
- El Sa"a Mat (The Waiter Died)
- Al-Karnak (Karnak)
- Viva Zalata (Long Live Zalata)
- El Kaddab (The Liar)
- Madraset El Morahekin (Teenagers school)
- Shellet El Mohtalin ( Cell Of Swindlers)
- El Shahhat (The Beggar)
- Akhtar Ragol Fi El 'Alam (The World's Most Dangerous Man)
- 'Aris Bent El Wazir ( Groom Of Daughter Of Minister)
- Saffah El Nesa' ( Women's Thug)
- Rob' Dastet Ashrar (Evil Dozen's Quarter)
- El 'Ataba Gazaz (Glass Threshold)
- Emra'ati Magnunah Magnunah (My Woman Is Mad Mad )
- 'Alam Modhek Geddan ( Very Funny World)
- Shanabo Fi El Masyadah (Shanabo In The Trap)
- El Ragel Da Ha Ygannenni (This Guy Will Make Me Crazy)
- Gharam Fi Aghostos (Love In August)
- El Shaqiqan (The 2 Brothers)
- Al Regal La Yatazwwagun El Gamilat (Men Don't Marry Beauties)
- El Mared (The Giant)
- Aros El Nil (The Nile's Bride)
- Tariq El Shitan (Devil's Road)
- El Zogah 13 (The Wife 13)
- Gharam El Asyad (Love Of Masters)
- El Do' El Khafet (The Faint Light)
- El Nashshal ( The Pickpocket)
- El Maganin Fi Na'im (Mad In Bliss)
- Kallemni Shokran (Call Me, Thanks)
- Sayyidati El Gamilah (My Beautiful Lady = My Fair Lady)
