= Lenin El-Ramly =

Egyptian writer (1945–2020)

- Born: August 18, 1945; Cairo
- Died: February 7, 2020 (aged 74)
- Occupations: Writer and film director
- Spouse: Fatma El Maadoul
- Children: Shady El Ramly; Hind El Ramly
- Mother: Souad Zuhair

Lenin El-Ramly (Arabic: لينين الرملي; August 18, 1945 – February 7, 2020) was an independent Egyptian writer and director of films and for television and theater. His work is in the field of satire, farce, parody and the Theatre of the Absurd.

He was recognized in Egypt and abroad for his daring, raising questions about the hypocritical and intolerant aspects of Egyptian society and other countries in the Arab world. His presentations were characterized as existentialist and sociopolitical questions within popular funny settings.

== Life and career ==
El-Ramly was born in August 1945 in Cairo to a politically engaged family. His mother was Souad Zuhair, a writer at Rosa al-Yusuf, a well known Egyptian magazine. He published his first short story in 1956 in the magazine Sabah El-Kheir. During his studies, in 1967, he started writing social comedies and series for television. In the 21st century, his work from this era is still being broadcast. In 1970, he obtained his bachelor's degree in Theater Critics and Theater Literature at the High Institute for Theater Art.

In 1971 El-Ramly and film director Salah Abu Seif began a close cooperation. During this time he wrote The Ostrich and the Peacock, which was only shown to the public for the first time in 2002, 30 years later. The censors claimed that the film featured a sexual dialogue that invoked sexual desires. According to El-Ramly, they had misunderstood his script.

El-Ramly founded his own theater company in 1980, called Studio 80. He has aimed to put other kinds of plays on stage than usually could be seen in commercial theatres. His 1991 work Bel-Arabi El-Faseeh, translated into English as In Plain Arabic, discusses Pan-Arabism. This play has been described as matchless satire, and was declared to be the Best Theater Play of the Year in Egypt. It landed him the Soad Sabbah Award from Kuwait, as well as praise from Western media critics, for instance, the Herald Tribune and Time Magazine. His theatre plays have been staged in the Arab world, as well as in Western countries like France and Australia. Notably, the Carthage Theatre Festival in Tunisia has refused to show In plain Arabic.

In 1993, El-Ramly founded his second theatre company, called Studio 2000. In 1994, he rewrote his debut from 1967 that he had introduced then under the title Al-Erhabi (The Terrorist). With this scenario, he became widely known in his own country and abroad.

El-Ramly's work is widely recognized. For instance, he won during the Vivay Film Festival for Comical Movies in 1987, and the aforementioned Kuwaiti Soad Sabbah Award in 1991. In 2005, El-Ramly was honored with the Prince Claus Award from the Netherlands. The jury valued his "constructive use of humour to provoke public analysis of social and cultural issues."

== Theater plays ==
AS of 2005, El-Ramly has written forty theatre plays in Arabic that have been shown on the stage like Al-Hamagi (1985), Wijhet Nazar (1989), and Keep Your Daughters Locked In (1980). Three of them were translated into English:

- 1994: In Plain Arabic, A U C in Cairo Press, Egypt, translated by Esmat Allouba, ISBN 977-424-342-0
- 1999: Point of view, Foreign Cultural Information Dept., Egypt, translated by Yussif Hifnawi, ISBN 97-7-236-252-X
- 1999: The Nightmare, City University Of N.Y, USA, translated by Wagdi Zeid

More plays have been translated in other languages, like The Prisoner from 2002 which was staged in Danish.

== Filmography ==
The following film scripts have been written by El-Ramly:

- 1983: A Marriage Proposal, Nagy Anglo
- 1985: The Man Who Sneezed, Omr Abd El Aziz
- 1986: Ali Bey and the 40 Thieves, Ahmed yassen
- 1986: The Beginning, Omr Abd El Aziz
- 1987: The Intern Lawyer, Salah Abou Seif
- 1994: Mr. Dog, Salah Abou Seif
- 1994: The Terrorist, Nader Galal
- 1995: Bekeet and Adeela, Nader Galal
- 1997: Bekeet and Adeela, Nader Galal
- 2000: Hello America, Nader Galal
- 2002: The Ostrich and The Peacock, Mohammed Abou Seif
