= Atef El Tayeb =

Egyptian film director (1947–1995)

- Born: 26 December 1947; Sohag Governorate, Egypt
- Died: 23 June 1995 (aged 47); Cairo, Egypt
- Citizenship: Egypt
- Education: Cairo Higher Institute of Cinema
- Occupation: Film director
- Notable work: El Heroob

Atef El Tayeb (Arabic: عاطف الطيب pronounced [ˈʕɑːtˤef etˈtˤɑjjeb]) (26 December 1947 – 23 June 1995) was an Egyptian film director. Alternative transliterations of his name are: Atef Al-Tayeb and Attef El Taieb. His films often depicted the struggles of ordinary people.

== Life and work ==
He was born in Sohag on December 26, 1947. He graduated from the Higher Institute of Cinema, specializing in directing, in 1970. During his studies, he worked as an assistant director with Medhat Bakir on the film Three Faces of Love (1969) and the film A Call for Life (1972). He also worked as an assistant editor with Kamal Abu Al-Ela.

In 1973, he worked as an assistant director to Shadi Abdel Salam on the film The Armies of the Sun. In 1978, he directed a short film titled The Barter, produced by the Experimental Center.

In 1978, he worked as an assistant director with director Youssef Shaaban Mohamed on the film Desire and the Price. In 1979, he served as a second assistant director with Youssef Chahine on the film Alexandria... Why?. In 1981, he collaborated with director Mohamed Shebl on the film Fangs.

== Filmography ==
=== As director ===
1. Gabr Al Khawater (1998)
2. kashf Al mastor (1994)
3. Leila Sakhina (A Hot Night) (1994)
4. Did el Hokouma (Against the Government) (1992)
5. Nagi El-Ali (1991)
6. Qalb al-Layl (Heart of the Night) (1989)
7. El Heroob (Escape) (1988)
8. The Innocent (1986)
9. El Zamar (The Piper) (1985)
10. Al Hob Fawk Habadet al Haram (Love on the Pyramids Plateau) (1984)
11. The Cell (El-Takhsheeba) (1983)
12. Sawak al-utubis (Bus Driver) (1982)

=== As assistant director ===
- Sphinx (1981)
- Gallipoli (1981) (assistant director for Egyptian version)
- The Awakening (1980)
- Death on the Nile (1978)
- El-Raghba wel Thaman (Desire and Price) (1978)
- The Spy Who Loved Me (1977)
- Da'wa Lil Hayah (A Call for Life) (1972)
