= Mohsen Zayed =

Egyptian author and screenwriter

- Born: August 13, 1944; Cairo
- Died: January 27, 2003 (aged 58–59)
- Occupation: Writer

Mohsen Zayed (Arabic: محسن زايد August 13, 1944 – January 27, 2003) was an Egyptian author, writer, and screenwriter.

== Biography ==
Mohsen Zayed was born in the Sayyidah Zainab District of Cairo. He studied at Egypt's Higher Institute of Cinema, initially specializing in the Editing Department before switching to the Directing Department in his final year, from which he graduated. Zayed is celebrated for crafting some of the most outstanding cinematic adaptations of Nobel laureate Naguib Mahfouz's works, having written numerous screenplays for both film and television based on Mahfouz's stories.

== Death ==
He died in Cairo at the age of 58 on Monday, January 27, 2003, due to a sudden Myocardial infarction.

== See also ==
- Naguib Mahfouz
