= Cinema of Egypt =

Egyptian cinema
- No. of screens: 221 (2015)
  - Per capita: 0.4 per 100,000 (2010)
- Main distributors: Misr International Films; Film Clinic; Oscar; Nasr; Synergy; Sphinx; Studio Misr; United

Produced feature films (2005–2009)
- Total: 42 (yearly average)

Number of admissions (2015)
- Total: 9,561,000

Gross box office (2015)
- Total: $267 million

The Egyptian film industry is today based mainly in Cairo, which is sometimes referred to as Hollywood on the Nile, Hollywood of the Middle East or Hollywood of the East, despite having its beginnings in the city of Alexandria in the early 20th century. A strong industry grew in Egypt with a high distribution rate among the Arab world, and Cairo produces around three-quarters of the Arab world's screen output. It has had a large effect on the Arab film industry since the early 20th century.

Egyptian cinema is considered a pioneer in African and Arab film industries. Since 1896, over 4,000 films have been produced in Egypt. Egyptian films are typically spoken in the Egyptian Arabic dialect. In 1936, Egypt held its first ever Egyptian cinema festival in Cairo, followed by another one in 1938. Since 1952, Cairo has held the Egyptian Catholic Center for Cinema Festival; it is the oldest film festival in the Middle East. In 1976, the capital held the annual FIAPF-accredited Cairo International Film Festival, which has since been held annually, and there are many more film festivals held in Egypt.

== History ==
=== Early history (1890s–1930s) ===
The earliest projections by the Lumière brothers, using a Lumière cinematograph in Egypt took place on 15 November 1896, at the Toussoun Exchange in Alexandria, afterwards, in Cairo on 28 November, which is less than one year after the first projection in Paris, on 28 December 1895. Egypt's first cinema opened its doors in Alexandria in 1897.

A limited number of silent films were made starting from that date, starting with the first Egyptian film released on 20 June 1907, a short documentary film about the visit of Khedive Abbas II to the Institute of Mursi Abul-Abbas in Alexandria called The Visit of the Khedive Abbas Helmi (1907). In 1911, laws organizing film industry were enacted in Egypt. In 1917, the director Mohammed Karim established a production company in Alexandria. The company produced two films: Dead Flowers (1917) and Bedouin's honor (1918), which were shown in the city of Alexandria in early 1918.

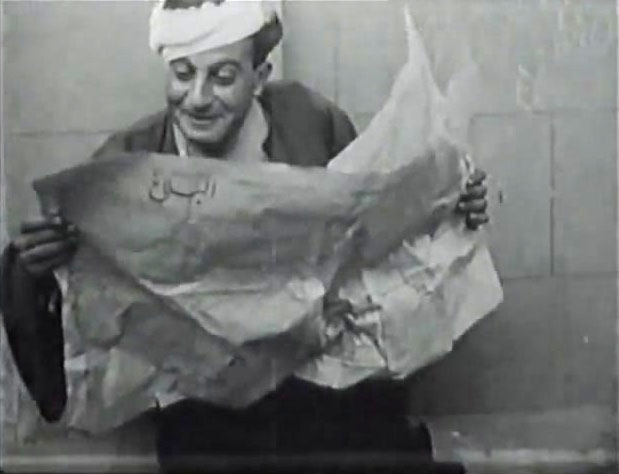
Bishara Wakim in Barsoum Looking for a Job (1923)

The year 1923 saw the publication of the first periodical review on film "Animated Images" by Mohamed Tawfik who was the owner and Editor in chief. In 1923, film director Mohamed Bayoumi produced and directed Barsoum Looking for a Job, starring Bishara Wakim. The first book on film "The Dawn of Cinema" was released in 1924, written by the director and researcher Mahmoud Khalil Rachid. In 1925, the first large production company was established; the Egyptian Acting and Cinema Company, which belonged to the Misr Bank, which had been founded in the wake of the 1919 revolution by Talaat Harb. By 1926, 86 cinemas were operating in Egypt. In 1927, Aziza Amir produced Laila (1927), the first feature-length Egyptian film in history.

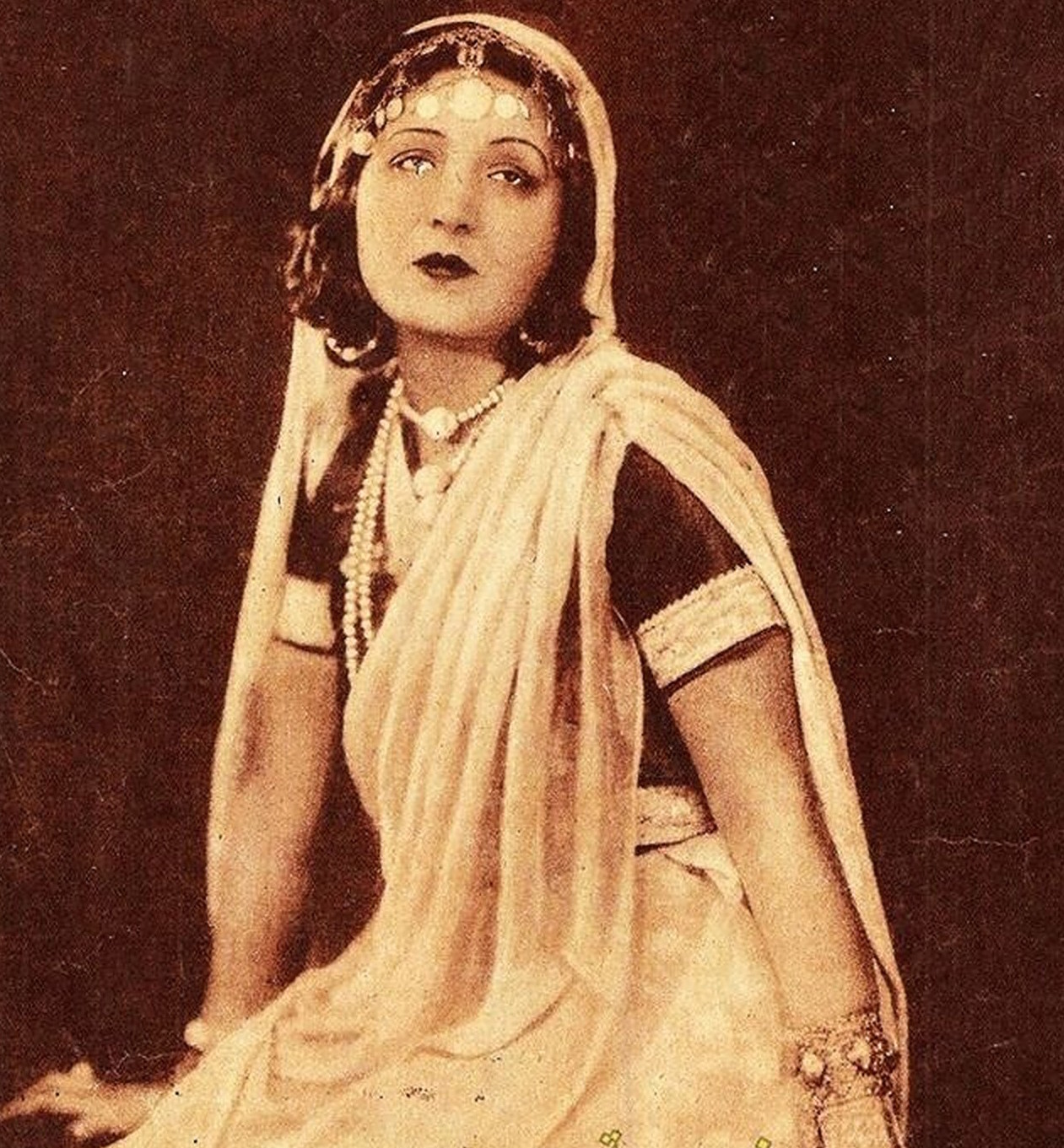
Aziza Amir in Laila (1927)

The following years saw the production of films such as Why Is the Sea Laughing? by Stephan Rosti, Tragedy at the Pyramids in 1928 by Ibrahim Lama, and others through the 1920s. Youssef Wahbi produced the 1930 film Zaynab starring Bahiga Hafez and based on the 1913 novel under the same name by Mohammed Hussein Heikal. Cairo's film industry became a regional force with the coming of sound. Between 1930 and 1936, various small studios produced at least 44 feature films.

=== Talkies ===
In 1932, the first talkies were released in Egypt, with Mohammed Karim's Sons of Aristocrats starring Youssef Wahbi and Amina Rizk, to be the first sound film in Egypt, and the Middle East. It was followed by 1932's The Song of the Heart, the first musical in Egypt and the Middle East. The second musical was produced in 1933; The White Rose, also directed by Karim, featuring popular Egyptian singer Mohamed Abdel Wahab in his film debut. The musical film became a major hit in Egypt throughout the 1930s and 1940s, with high distribution among the Arab world.

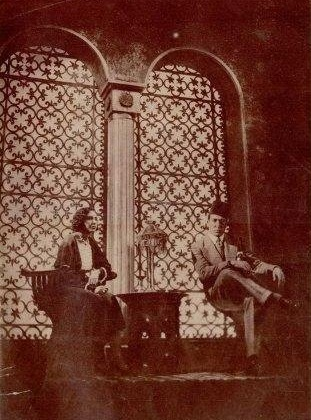
Publicity still for Sons of Aristocrats (1932), first Egyptian sound film

Several sound films were released in 1933, such as; The Marriage by Fatima Rushdi, Atone for Your Sin by Aziza Amir, The Night of a Lifetime by Mohamed Bayoumi, starring Amina Mohamed and Ahmad Farid, Enchanting Eyes by Ahmed Galal, starring Galal with Assia Dagher, The Accusation by Mario Volpe, starring Bahiga Hafez and Zaki Rostom. In 1934, Naguib el-Rihani starred in His Excellency Kechkech Bey, the sound version of the 1931 silent film of the same title.

Magda Wassef, in her book Egypte: 100 ans de Cinema, defines realism in cinema as a reflection of reality, how we understand reality, how we discover the factual causes of certain circumstances, as well as shedding light on the changes that occur from an individual perspective as well as a collective one. She mentions three films in the 1930s and 1940s Egyptian cinema that fulfill these elements of realism on different levels: Fritz Kramp's Lachine (1938), Kamal Selim's The Will (1939), and Kamel al-Telmessani's The Black Market (1945).

=== Studio Misr ===
In 1935, Studio Misr (also known as Studios Misr or in English as The Studio of Egypt), financed by industrialist Talaat Harb, emerged as the leading Egyptian equivalent to Hollywood's major studios, a role the company retained for three decades. Historian Samir Kassir notes (2004) that Studio Misr (founded 1935) in particular, "despite their ups and downs, were to make Cairo the third capital of the world's film industry, after Hollywood and Bombay, but ahead of Italy's Cinecittà."

Umm Kulthum in Weddad (1936)

Umm Kulthum starred in Weddad, her film debut in 1936, which was the first production of Studio Misr, the film was a hit in Egypt and the Arab world. Several films were released by the studio the best few years such as Salama Is Okay with Studio Misr in 1937, the film stars Naguib el-Rihani who was a theatre actor and starred in several comedy films in the 1930s and the 1940s.

=== Musicals ===
Egyptian audience paid for tickets to watch musicals with the main reason of listening to their beloved singers. Singers such as Mohammed Abdel Wahab, Umm Kulthum in the 1930s, Laila Mourad, Abdel Aziz Mahmoud, Karem Mahmoud, Nour Al-Huda and others in the 1940s, shaped the map of musical film.

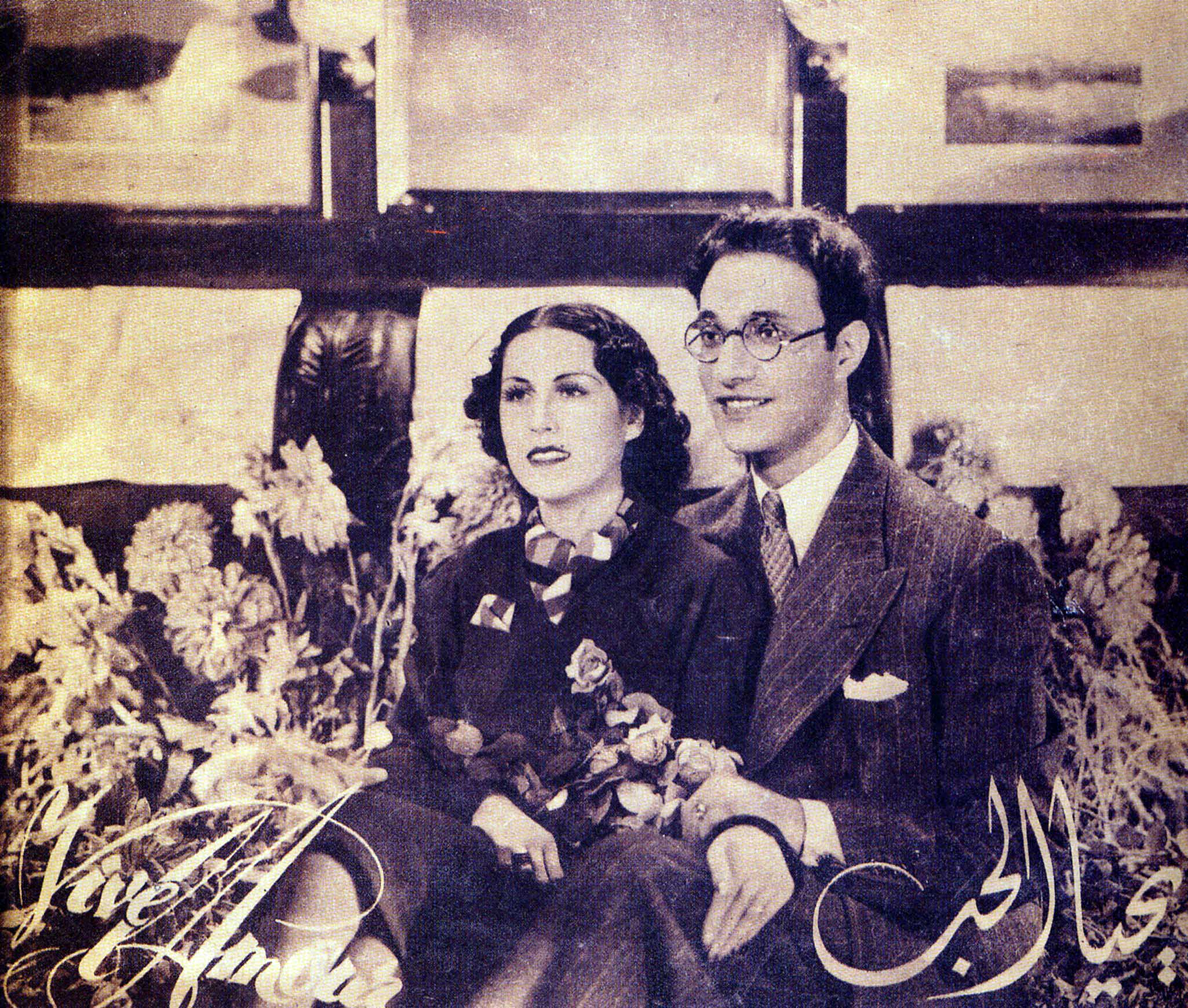
Publicity still for Yahya el hub (1938)

Mervat Amin and Abdel Halim Hafez in Abi Foq El Shagara (1969)

Theatre was the major force before film industry began attracting audiences, we can see singers singing over eights songs in one film. Laila Mourad and Mohammed Abdel Wahab were bankable stars. In the 1950s and 1960s, Abdel Halim Hafez was the main film star from the music industry, although, he quickly escaped from the musical genre and performed in drama and romance film genres, such as the 1962 film The Sins by Hassan el-Imam. Musical genre declined in the Egyptian film industry in the 1970s and 1980s and singers started to star in different genres, however, several singers from newer generations became film stars such as; Mohamed Fouad and Mostafa Amar. In the 2000s, Tamer Hosny is arguably the only singer in the film industry with over ten feature films in a leading role.

=== Golden Age: 1940s–1960s ===
The 1940s, 1950s and the 1960s are generally considered the Golden Age of Egyptian cinema. In the 1950s, Egypt's cinema industry was the world's third largest. As in the West, films responded to the popular imagination, with most falling into predictable genres (happy endings being the norm), and many actors making careers out of playing strongly typed parts. In the words of one critic, "If an Egyptian film intended for popular audiences lacked any of these prerequisites, it constituted a betrayal of the unwritten contract with the spectator, the results of which would manifest themselves in the box office."

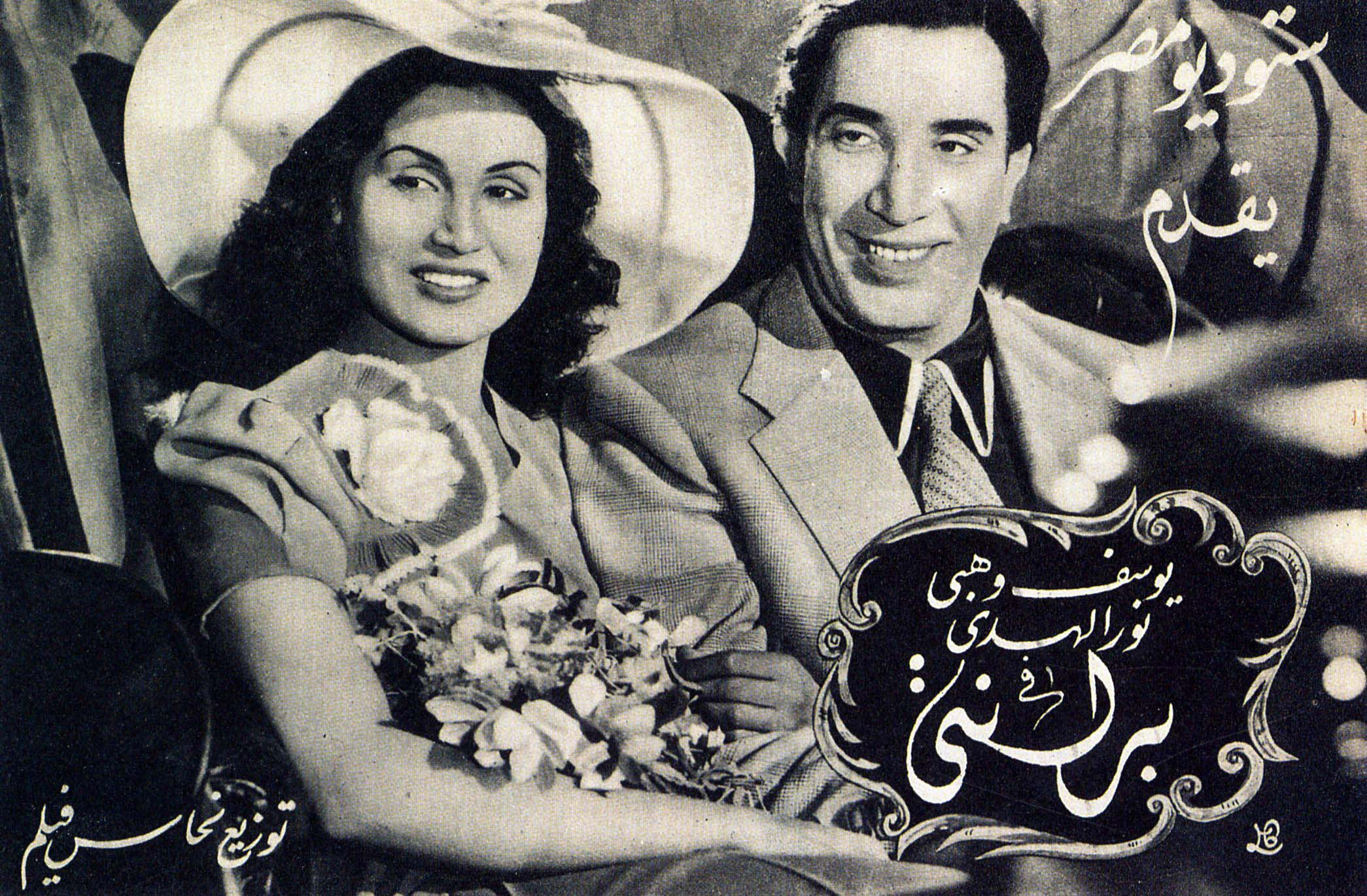
Publicity still for Berlanti (1944)

In 1940, the entrepreneur and translator Anis Ebeid established "Anis Ebeid Films", as the first subtitling company in Egypt and the rest of the Middle East, bringing hundreds of American and World movies to Egypt. Later he entered the movie distribution business too. Egyptian cinema flourished in the 1940s, with the number of films produced increased to 16 films in the 1944–45 season. This was due to the entry of investments after World War II into the film industry, and greater purchasing power of citizens. From 1945 to 1951, production increased to 50 films per year. By 1949, there were 244 cinemas and five studios with 11 shooting areas.

Egyptian films played an important role in linking Arab society and marketing Egyptian culture. More than any other method, it spread the Egyptian dialect. This status was affected by the waves that occurred in Arab relations, sometimes strengthening and sometimes weakening them, which led to an ebb and flow in the distribution of Egyptian film in Arab countries. A boycott of Egyptian films occurred at intermittent periods in the 1950s due to political tensions between Arab states in the Arab Cold War.

In 1944, the Al-Ahram Studio was established in the Giza district of Cairo, and became one of the most prestigious film (and later TV) production studios in the Middle East, in competition with Studio Misr. In the 1950s, Egypt ranked third in the world in number of films produced. In 1950, Studio Misr produced the film Baba Aris, the first Egyptian film entirely in natural color, starring Naima Akef, Fouad Shafik, Camelia, and Shoukry Sarhan.

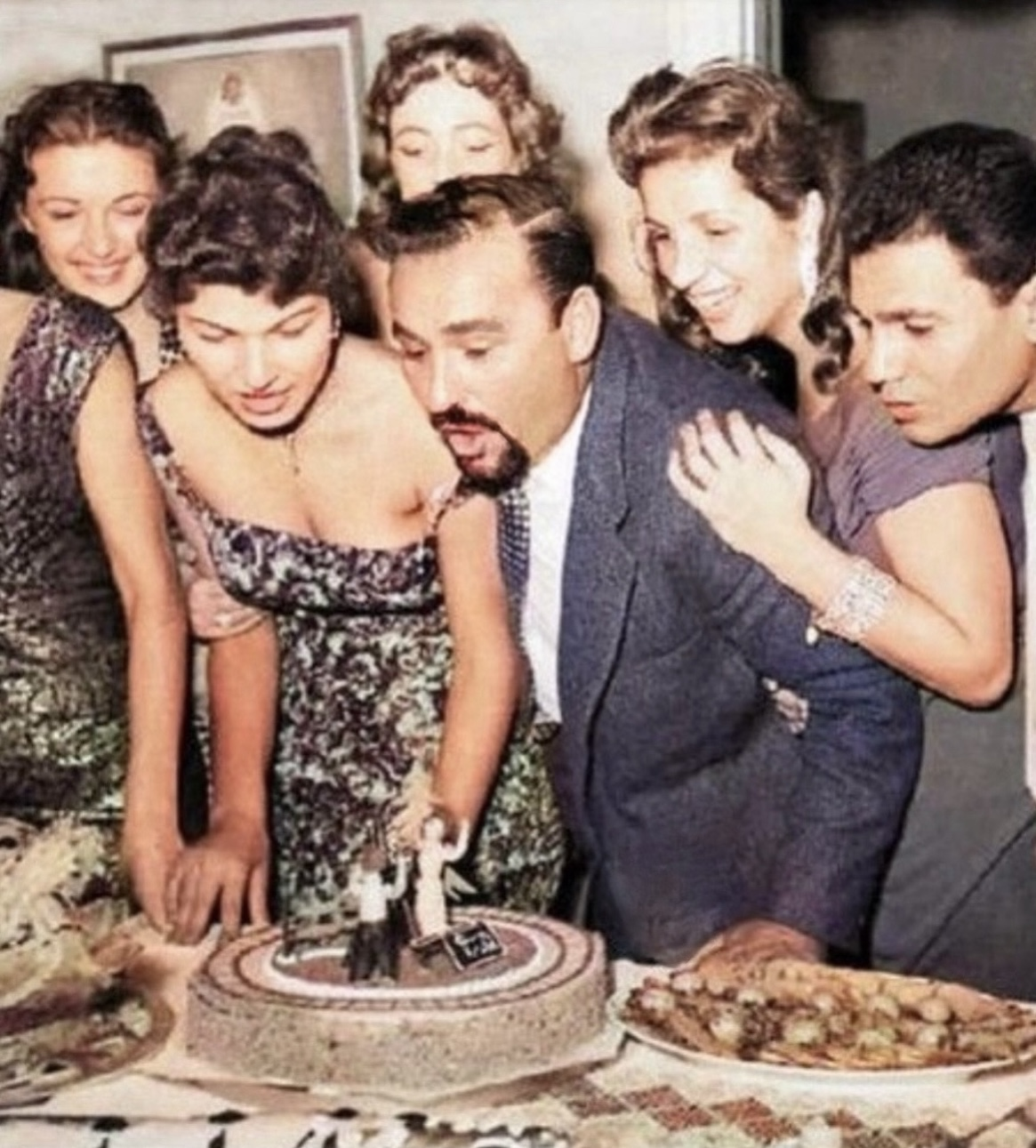
Egyptian film stars (from right to left); Abdel Halim Hafez, Sabah, Ezz El-Dine Zulficar, Huda Sultan, Kawthar Shafik, and Mariam Fakhr Eddine attending Zulficar's birthday, 1959

In 1951, Mohamed Fawzi experimented with coloring two of his films: Love in Danger and The End of a Story. Unfortunately, the two films burned on their way from France to Egypt, and the black-and-white copies remained on Egyptian television. It was said that Mohamed Fawzi was not satisfied with the quality. The colors in the first film were poor, so he had to re-shoot it, which caused him huge financial losses. In 1956, the film Dalila was produced in Scope colours, starring Abdel Halim Hafez and Shadia. Afterwards, many Egyptian-colored Egyptian films were produced on a limited basis in the 1950s and 1960s, and in the 1970s, specifically after the 1973 October War, colors became prevalent in most films.

Political changes in Egypt after the overthrow of King Farouk in 1952 initially had little effect on Egyptian film. However the government under President Gamal Abdel Nasser sought control over the industry after turning to socialism in the 1960s. Egyptian cinema reacted quickly to the July 1952 revolution, political films encountering the foreign influence started to be produced with films talking about patriotism and nationalism were in demand at the time. Hussein Sedki presented the film Down with Colonialism a few months after the revolution, in a natural and automatic reaction to the idea of national enthusiasm that was existed at that time, especially since the film worked on the nature of colonialism and not the internal matter related to the corruption of parties as happened after that, and the national feeling was very important to remain present, especially during the period of armed struggle against English colonialism, which began before the 1952 revolution with the abolition of 1936 Treaty when it was canceled by El-Nahas Pasha in October 1951. The tone of the films that worked on the July revolution increased, such as the 1955 film God is With Us, Ezz El-Dine Zulficar's Return My Heart in 1957. Other films were related to the feudal class and the pasha class, such as The Blazing Sun by Youssef Chahine, and the idea of corrupt, or otherwise pashas. The Egyptian cinema flourished in the 1950s.

In the 1950s and '60s, realism became a more dominant genre/artistic style. Some directors ' works were more consistent than others in the realist genre. These directors include Salah Abou Seif, Youssef Chahine, Atef Salem, Kamal al-Cheikh, Henri Barakat, Niazi Mostafa, and Tewfik Saleh. Tewfik Saleh was the only director who used realism as a consistent genre in all 6 of his films.

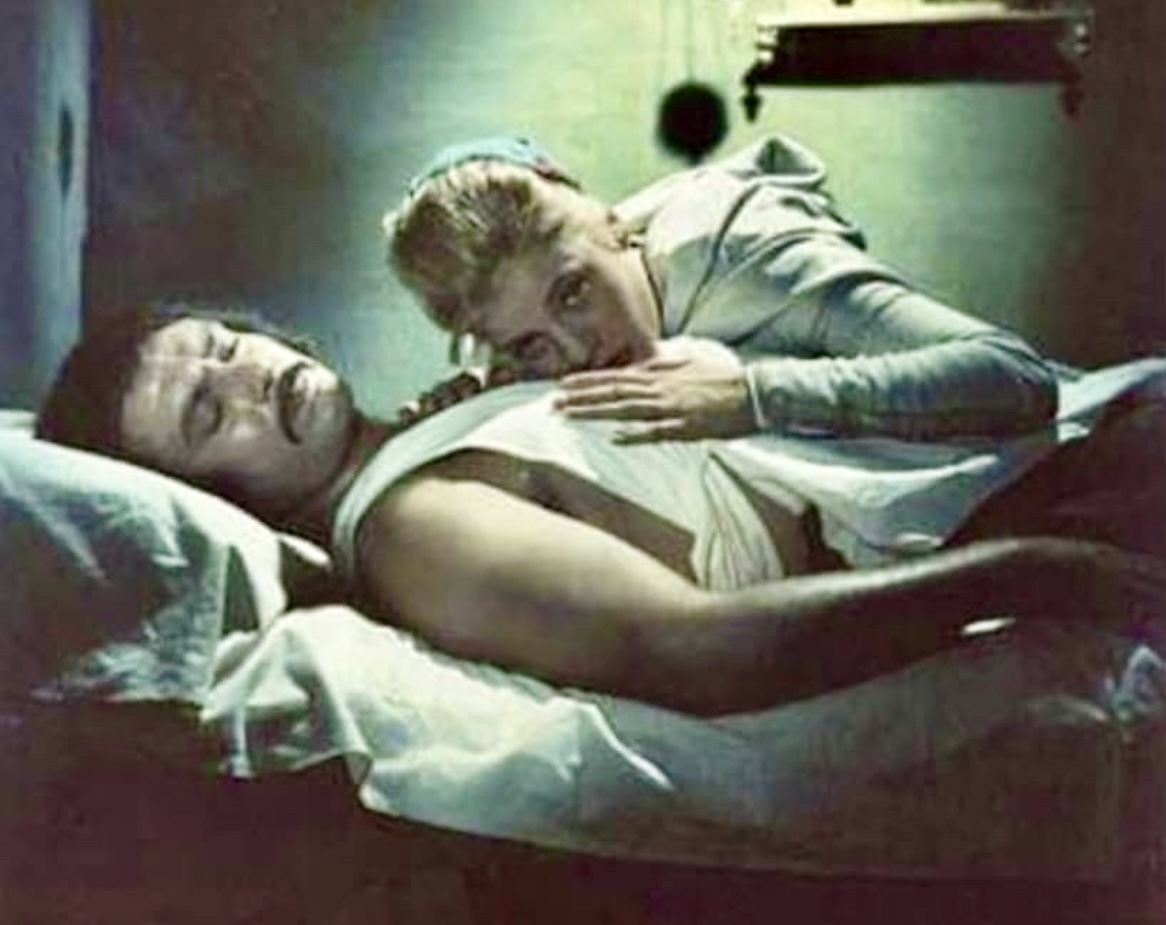
Salah Zulfikar and Nadia Lutfi in Saladin the Victorious (1963)

In 1960, the Studio Misr was nationalised, and other studios soon followed, including Al-Ahram, along with distribution companies. Only Studio Nasabian remained in private ownership. In 1962, the Ministry of Culture and National Guidance took over the whole industry, causing inefficiencies and a drop in production and in film exports. The General Cinema Foundation was established to produce feature films, which led to a decrease in the average number of films from 60 to 40 films per year, and by 1966 the number of theaters also decreased from 354 in 1954 to 255 houses. By 1966, the entire Egyptian film industry had been nationalized. In the words of Ahmed Ramzi, a leading man of the era, the cinema industry "went to the dogs". In this era, an emerging generation of film stars came to prominence such as: Shoukry Sarhan, Soad Hosny, Salah Zulfikar, Rushdy Abaza, Nadia Lutfi, Faten Hamama, Omar Sharif, Kamal el-Shennawi, Shadia, Mariam Fakhr Eddine, Lobna Abdel Aziz, Abdel Halim Hafez, Huda Sultan, Hind Rostom, Farid Shawqi, Zubaida Tharwat, Ismail Yassine, Magda, Laila Fawzi, Ahmed Mazhar, and Sabah.

Egyptian films shown in the 1960s can be divided into three sections: films that deal with the subject of poverty, raising the value of work, and praising socialist society, such as the film Soft Hands directed by Mahmoud Zulfikar, films that condemned opportunistic models and social diseases such as bribery, corruption, and theft crimes, such as Miramar, and films that dealt with issues of people's political participation, condemned negativity. Other films also addressed topics of democracy, connection to the land, and resistance, such as the film The Rains Dried.

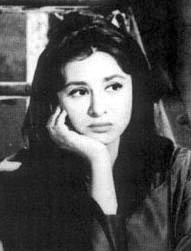
Faten Hamama in The Sin (1965)

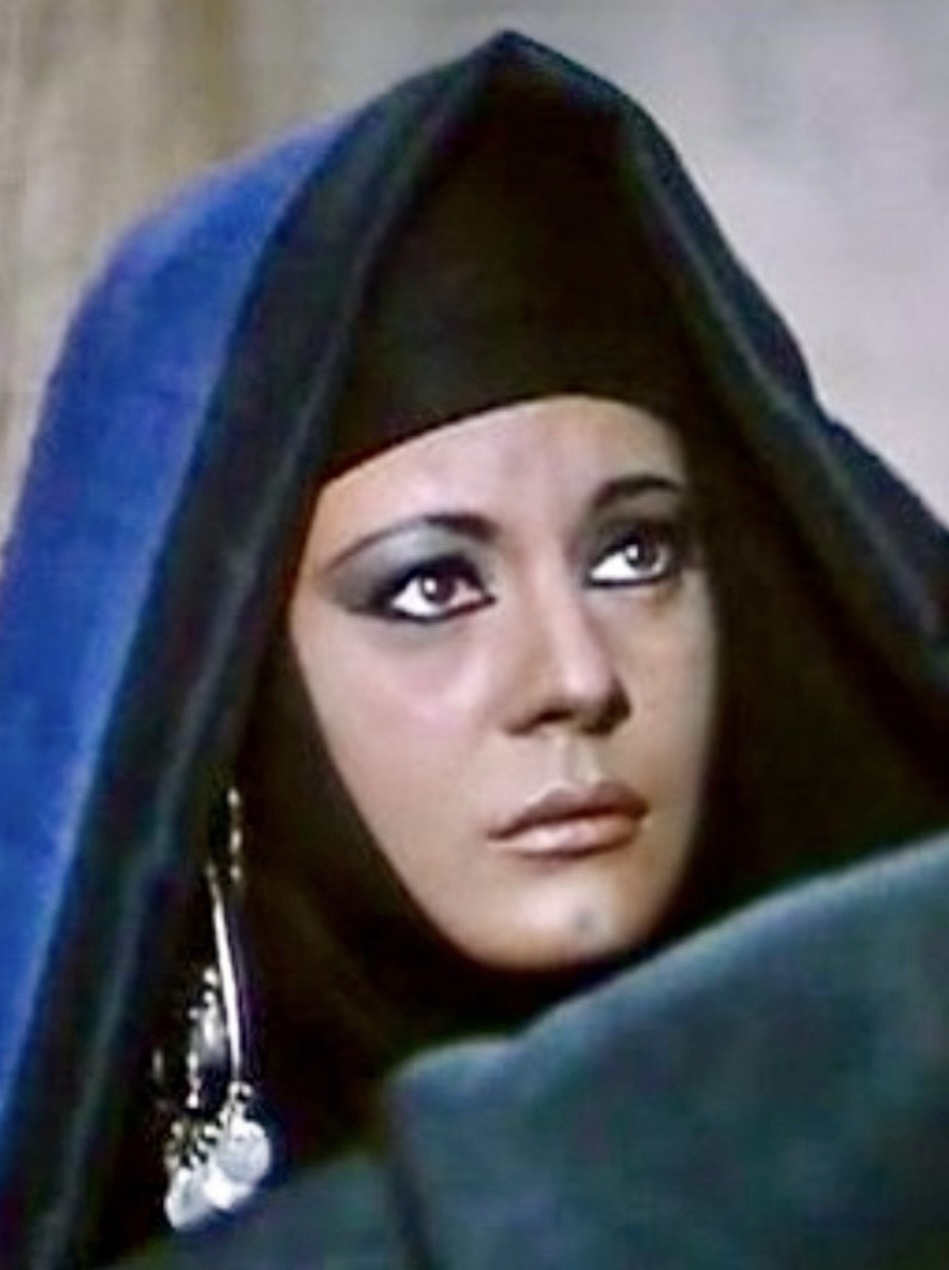
Nadia Lutfi in The Night of Counting the Years (1969)

The "heavy government hand" that accompanied nationalization of Egyptian film "stifled innovative trends and sapped its dynamism". However, most of the 60 Egyptian films featuring in the best 100 Egyptian films list of all time were produced during the golden age. Notable titles includes; The Night of Counting the Years, Aghla Min Hayati, Cairo Station, The Second Man, My Wife, the Director General, Saladin the Victorious, Return My Heart, Last Night, A Taste of Fear, The Postman, The Beginning and the End, Soft Hands, The Land, The Thief and the Dogs, There is a Man in Our House, The Sin and others.

=== 1970s ===
By the 1970s, Egyptian films struck a balance between politics and entertainment. Films such as 1972's Watch Out for ZouZou by Hassan el-Imam, starring "the Cinderella of Arab cinema", Soad Hosny, sought to balance politics and audience appeal. Zouzou integrated music, dance, and contemporary fashions into a story that balanced campus ferment with family melodrama.

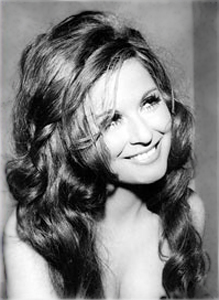
Publicity still for Watch Out for ZouZou (1972)

The early 1970s was filled with films depicting the reasons behind Egypt's defeat in the 1967 War, especially the era between the defeat and the victory in the 1973 war. Films such as Hussein Kamal's Chitchat on the Nile in 1971, based on the 1966 book Adrift on the Nile by Naguib Mahfouz, the film encounters the society for the defeat. The reason behind the defeat was depicted in Thalal Ala al-Janib al-Akhar by Ghalib Shaath. Over 20 Another important films depicted the same issue, such as 1972's Dawn Visitor, which dealt with the excess security grip against opposition. The factors involved in this social and intellectual crisis were also treated in three important films of Youssef Chahine. In The Choice (1970), Chahine explores what he describes as the schizophrenia of the contemporary Arab intellectual, who on one hand is committed to romantic notions of the revolution and social change, and on the other is tied to personal selfish ambitions and goals, remnants of a colonial formation.

In The Sparrow, which was not released by the censors until after the October War in 1973. Chahine reasserts his contention that the defeat was indeed internal, a product of the defects of the society itself. Other films were criticizing the Nasserist era such as the 1975 film Karnak, as well as We Are the Bus in 1979 and others. Moreover, Dawn Visitor (1972) was additionally attacked by censors because it highlighted power in contrast to the average citizen. All of these films attempt to clarify methods of suppressing opposition.

This decade saw light comedy films which performed well in the box-office such as 1974's In Summer We Must Love starring Salah Zulfikar, one of this era's greatest bankable stars who starred in Virgo, and the psychological drama film The Other Man of 1973, all of which were box-office hits. Also the Box-Office King Hassan el-Imam directed films such as the 1975's I Love This, I Want That and Truth Has a Voice (1976). Other films encountered corruption such as the 1975 film Whom Should We Shoot? by Kamal El Sheikh.

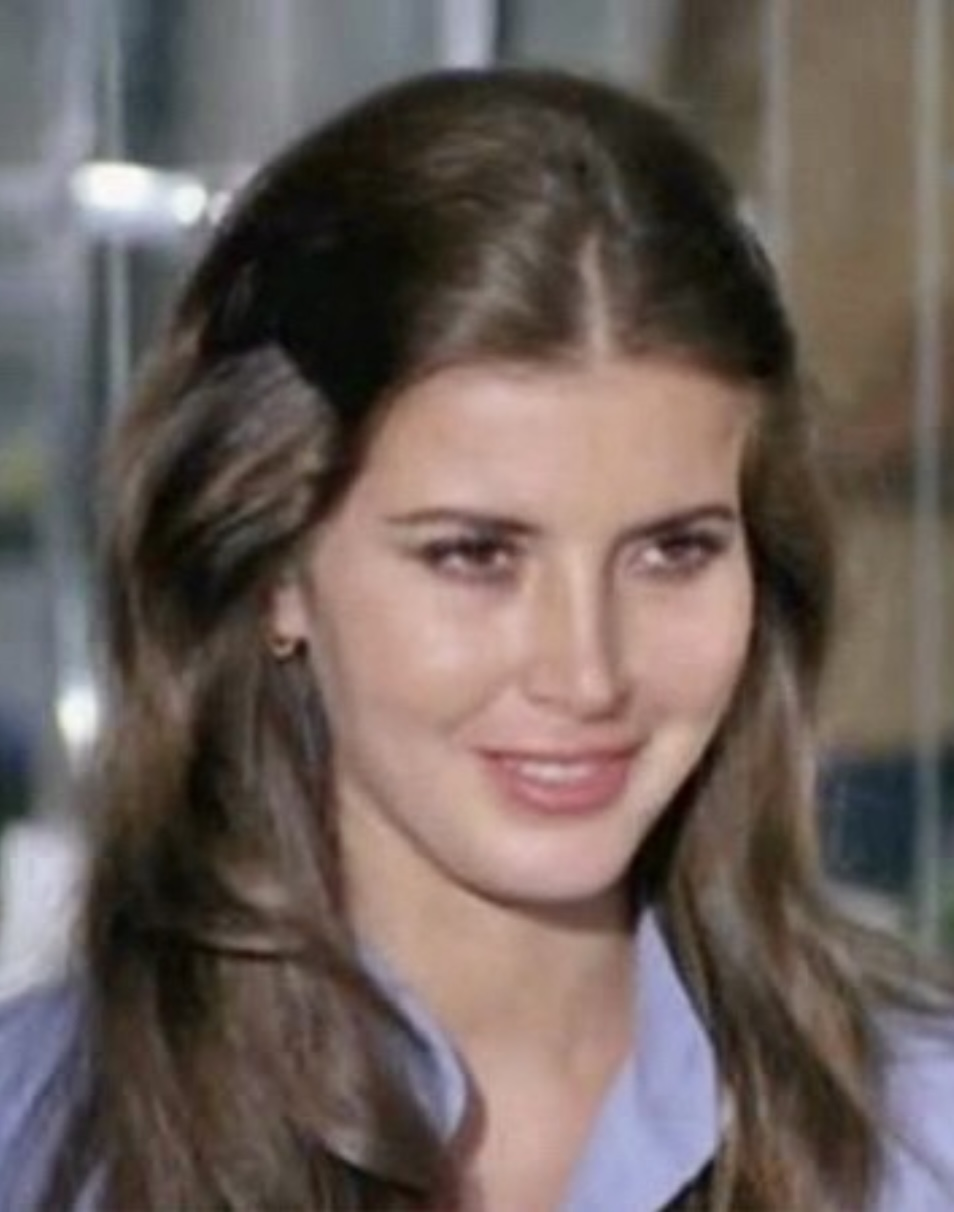
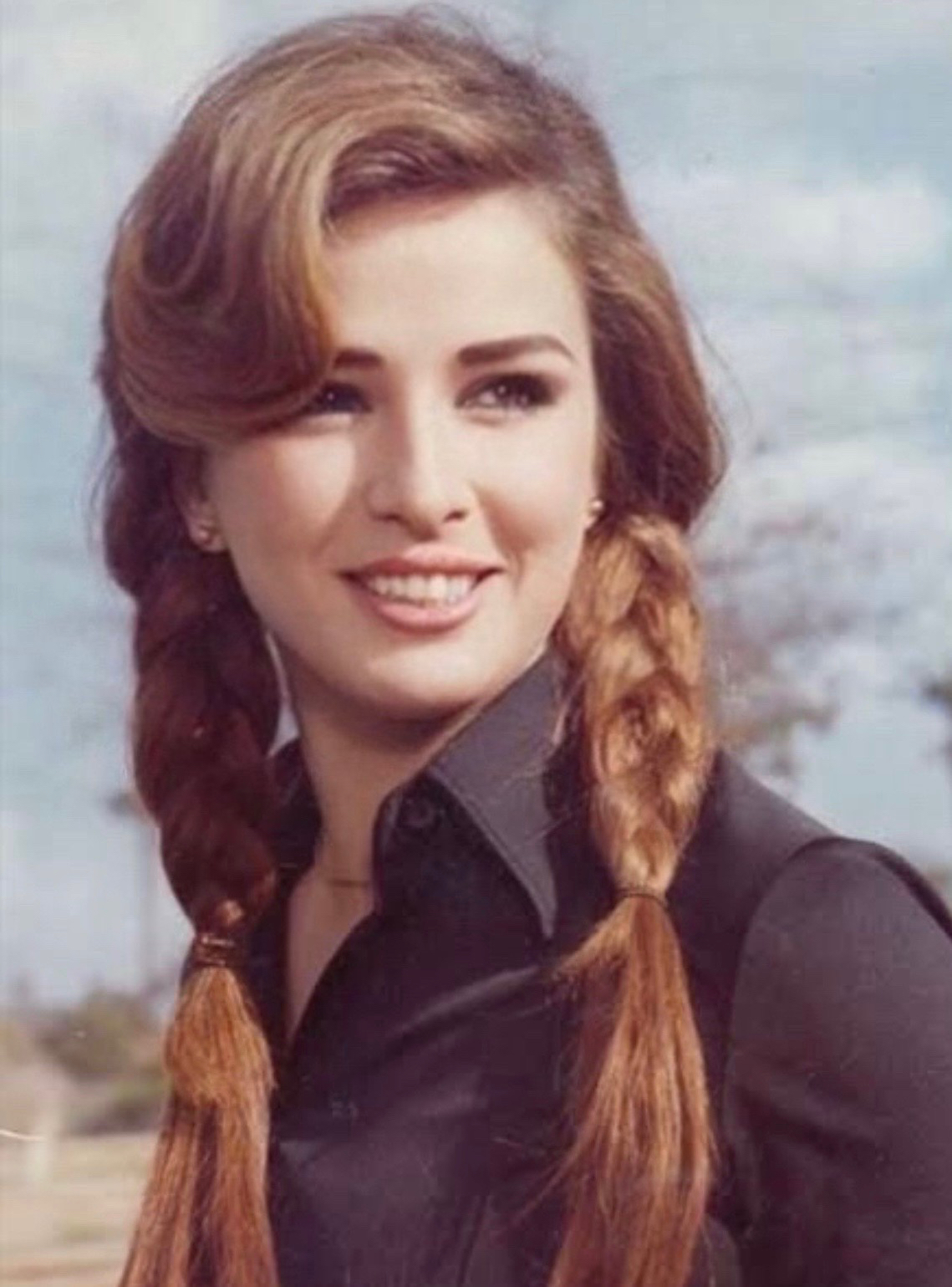
Mervat Amin and Naglaa Fathi, film stars of the 1970s

In mid-1971, the General Cinema Foundation was liquidated and a public body was established that included cinema, theater and music. The Authority stopped film production, contenting itself with financing the private sector, and the state's role in cinema began to decline until it completely ended novel production. Only two companies remained with the state, one for studios and the other for distribution and theaters. However, the average number of films produced remained 40 films until 1974, then it rose to 50 films, and the number of theaters continued to decline until it reached 190 in 1977.

After the victory in the 1973 War, several films depicted the war and its prelude as well as the dramatic events that took place during the war such as The Bullet is Still in My Pocket in 1974, as well as Bodour and Sons of Silence, both released in 1974, and Life is a Moment in 1978. In Until the end of Life by Ashraf Fahmy, it dealt with a humanitarian angle away from battle scenes.

Notable 1970s titles include; Sunset and Sunrise, The Guilty, I Want a Solution, Whom Should We Shoot?, Alexandria... Why?, Shafika and Metwali. Hassan Ramzi's 1975 Egyptian film Al-Rida’ al-Abyad was released in the Soviet Union in 1976, selling 61 million tickets in the country. This made it the highest-grossing foreign film of the year and the seventh highest-grossing foreign film ever in the Soviet Union. This also made it the highest-grossing Egyptian film of all time, with its Soviet ticket sales surpassing the worldwide ticket sales of all other Egyptian films, achieving revenue over $28,700,000 in 1975.

=== Transitional period: 1980s–1990s ===
The 1980s saw the Egyptian film industry in decline; however, the industry saw huge box-office jumps. A new wave of young directors emerged who were able to overcome the prevailing production traditions and create serious cinema. They were called the Neo-Realism Movement or the generation of the eighties. From this generation were Atef El Tayeb, Khairy Beshara, Mohamed Khan, Raafat Al-Mihi, Ali Abdelkhalek and others.

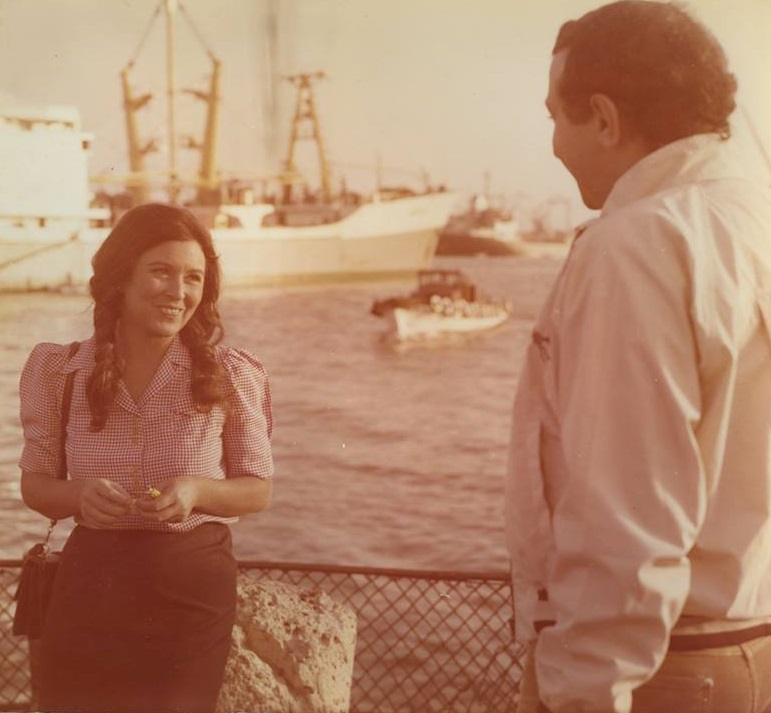
Soad Hosny and Nour El Sherif in People on the Top (1981)

Also, a new generation of films stars such as: Ahmed Zaki, Nour El-Sherif, Adel Imam, Mahmoud Abdel Aziz, Nabila Ebeid, Nadia El Gendy, Yousra, Laila Elwi, Elham Shahin, and Sherihan, emerged during that period. In the 1980s, Egyptian cinema produced notable films, such as; The Shame, An Egyptian Story, The Bus Driver, The Peacock, The Innocent, The Collar and the Bracelet, A Moment of Weakness, The Wife of an Important Man, Escape and The Puppeteer. In the mid-eighties, specifically at the beginning of 1984, the number of films produced suddenly increased to 63 films.

In the 1990s, however, saw the rise of what came to be called "contractor movies". Actor Khaled El Sawy has described these as films "where there is no story, no acting and no production quality of any kind... basic formula movies that aimed at making a quick buck." the number of films produced also declined: from nearly 100 films a year in the industry's prime to about a dozen in 1995. This lasted until summer 1997, when Ismailia Rayeh Gayy (translation: Ismailia back and forth) shocked the cinema industry, enjoying unparalleled success and large profits for the producers, introducing Mohamed Fouad (a famous singer) and Mohamed Henedi, then a rather unknown actor who later became the number one comedian star. Building on the success of that movie, several comedy films were released in the following years.

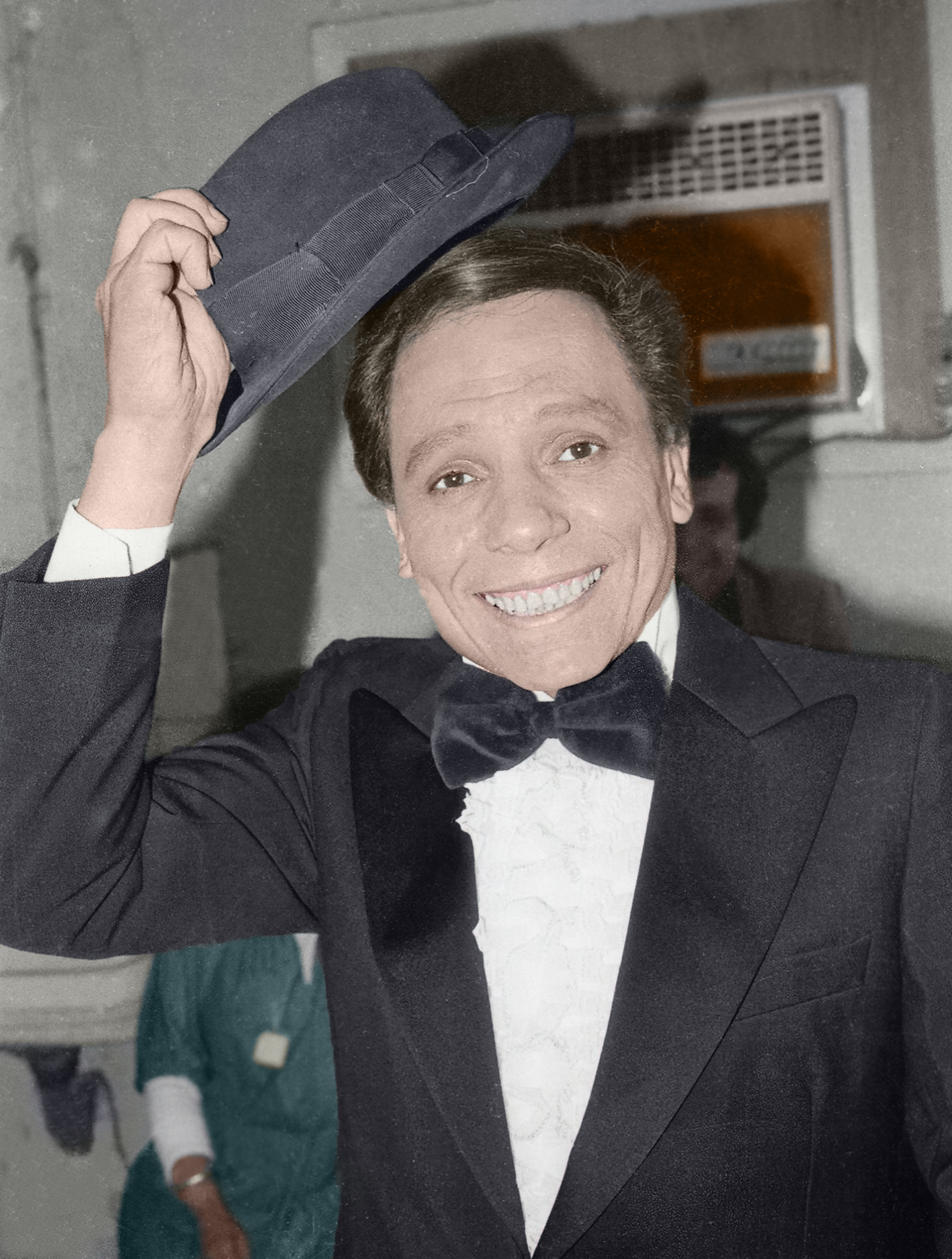
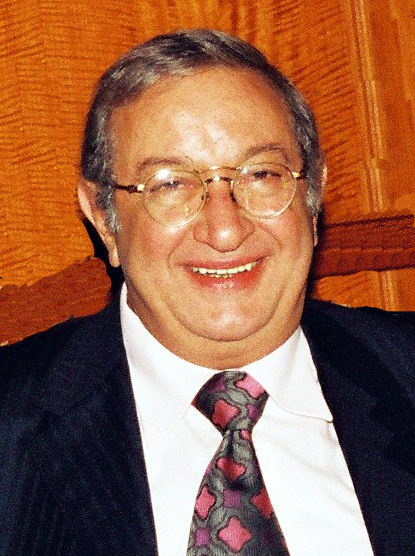
Adel Emam and Nour El Sherif, Egyptian film stars

The 1990s notable titles include; Alexandria Again and Forever, War in the Land of Egypt, The Kit Kat, The Shepherd and the Women, Terrorism and Kebab, The Terrorist, Five-Star Thieves, Road to Eilat, The Emigrant, Nasser 56, Destiny, Land of Fear, and The City. Since the mid-1990s, Egypt's cinema has gone in separate directions. Smaller art films attract some international attention, but sparse attendance at home. Popular films, often broad comedies such as What a Lie!, and the extremely profitable works of comedian Mohamed Saad, battle to hold audiences either drawn to Western films or, increasingly, wary of the perceived immorality of film. The 1990s also saw Egyptian cinema participating in the martial arts genre with actors such as Youssef Mansour who became famous for his films that relied on martial arts.

=== Revival: 21st century ===
With the beginning of the 21st century, a new generation of film stars appeared, the most famous of whom were Mona Zaki, Ahmed El Sakka, Menna Shalabi, Karim Abdel Aziz, Hend Sabry, Ghada Adel, Ahmed Ezz, Ahmed Helmy, Yasmine Abdulaziz, Mohamed Saad, Tamer Hosny, Mai Ezz Eldin, Nour, Hany Ramzy, Nelly Karim, Basma, and Dalia El Behery. They starred in many films and were able to achieve success and fame within a short period of time during that period.

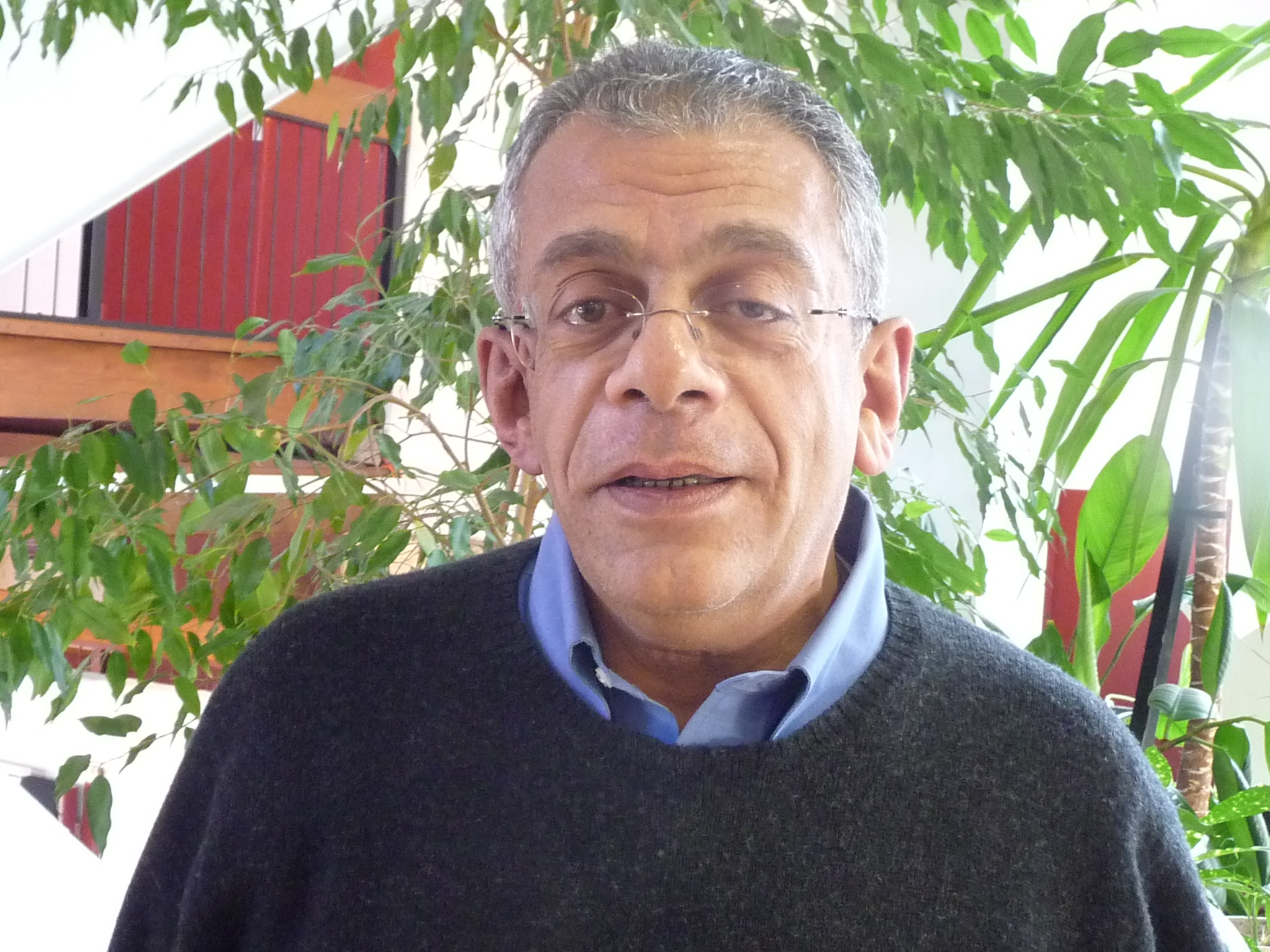
Yousry Nasrallah, Egyptian film director

A few productions, such as 2003's Sleepless Nights, intertwined stories of four bourgeois couples and 2006's Imarat Yacoubian (The Yacoubian Building) bridge this divide through their combination of high artistic quality and popular appeal. In 2006, the film Leisure Time was released. A social commentary on the decline of Egyptian youth, the film was produced on a low budget and had attendant low production values. The film, however, became a success. Its controversial subject matter, namely, the sexual undertones in today's society, was seen as confirmation that the industry was beginning to take risks. A major challenge facing Egyptian and international scholars, students and fans of Egyptian film is the lack of resources in terms of published works, preserved and available copies of the films themselves, and development in Egypt of state and private institutions dedicated to the study and preservation of film.

The Egyptian National Film Centre (ENFC), which theoretically holds copies of all films made after 1961, is according to one Egyptian film researcher, "far from being a library, houses piles of rusty cans containing positive copies." The year 2007, however, saw a considerable spike in the number of Egyptian films made. In 1997, the number of Egyptian feature-length films created was 16; 10 years later, that number had risen to 40. Box office records have also risen significantly, as Egyptian films earned locally around $50 million.

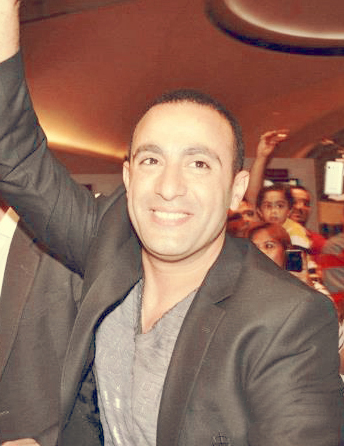
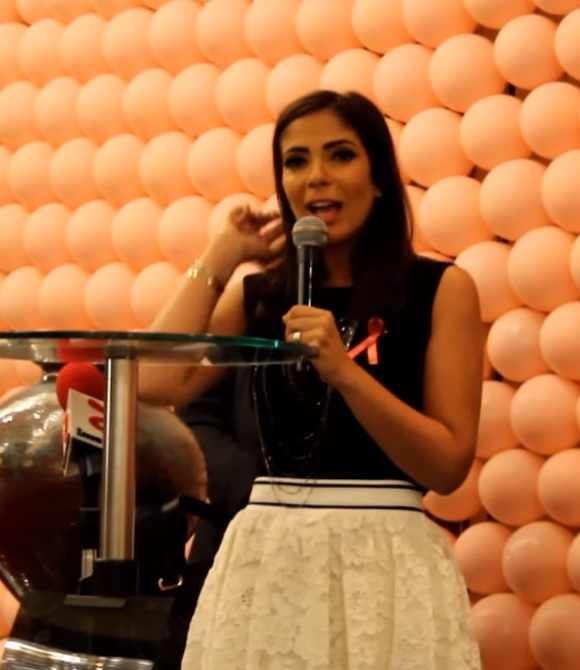
Ahmed El Sakka and Mona Zaki, Egyptian film stars

In the 2010s, new films stars entered the Egyptian box, such as: Ahmed Mekky, Ruby, Asser Yassin, Donia Samir Ghanem, Amina Khalil, Ahmed El-Fishawy, Mohamed Emam, Yasmin Raeis, Amr Saad, Bayoumi Fouad, Maged El Kedwany, Dina El Sherbiny, Hesham Maged, Shiko, Amr Youssef and Ahmed Fahmy. There are notable films released in this period, such as; 678, Microphone, Asmaa, The Deal, Decor, Bebo and Beshir, The Blue elephant, Excuse My French, Hepta, Gunshot, X-Large, Papa, After the Battle, Diamond Dust, The Blue elephant 2, The Treasure, Sons of Rizk, The Originals, The Treasure 2, Sheikh Jackson, Casablanca, Sons of Rizk 2, 122, The Crime and others. During Eid al-Fitr (which is the season of new films in Egypt) for the year 2016, several films were shown in Egyptian theaters, many of them comedies, namely: Crash, Hell in India, Abu Shanab. The film 30 Years Ago was also shown, which is an action and drama film starring an ensemble cast including: Ahmed El Sakka, Mona Zaki, Mervat Amin, Sherif Mounir and Nour in the starring roles. In 2017, many films were shown, including: The Cell, Ali, the Goat and Ibrahim, Emergency escape, Brooks, Meadows and Lovely Faces, Lucky Bank, and others. Between 1896 and 2021, over 4,000 films were produced in Egypt.

== Overview ==
The Egyptian film industry is based mainly in Cairo, which is sometimes referred to as "Hollywood on the Nile". As of 2024, despite being in an economic crisis, Egypt produces three-quarters of the Arab world's screen output.

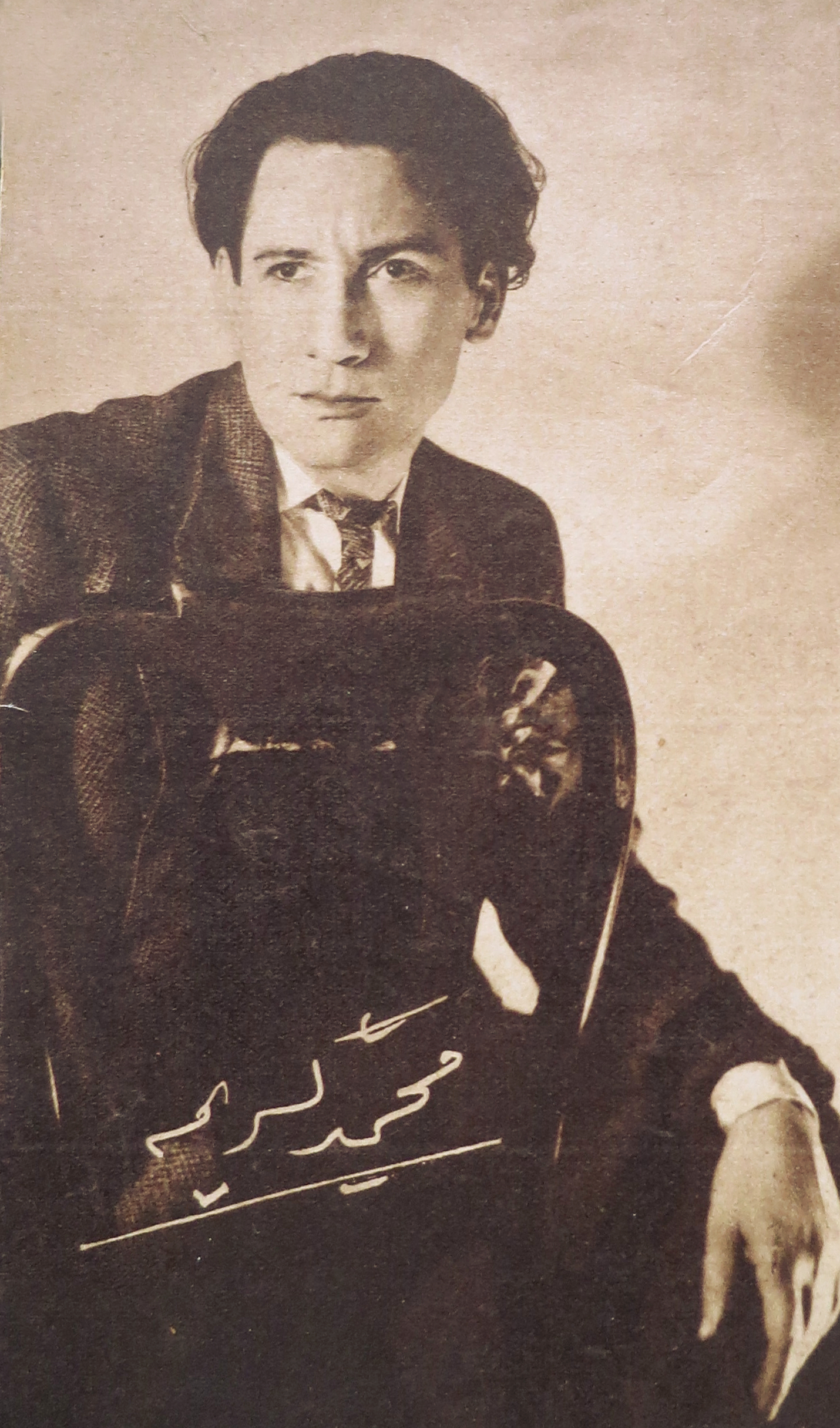
Mohammed Karim, Egyptian filmmaker

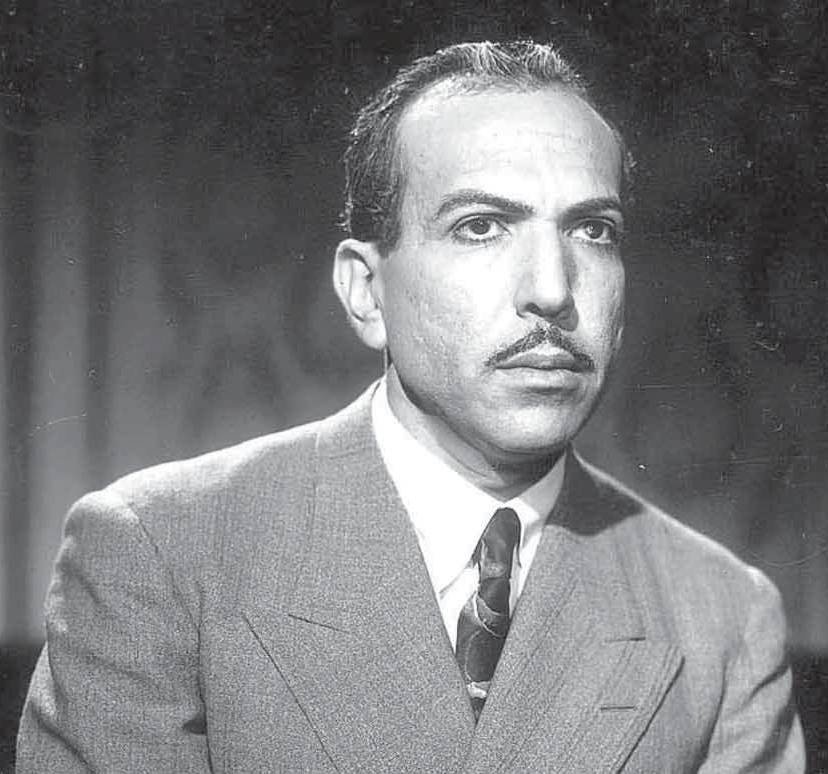
Egyptian iconic actor Zaki Rostom

Egyptian film faced many changes throughout the 20th century, the musicals prevalence in the 1930s and 1940s, the emergence of thrillers, suspense, romantic and melodrama films in the 1950s. War and action films in the 1960s. And the light comedies in the 1970s, which had many social and political objections and criticism in the press, Egyptian directors were complaining about social problems and the absence of Egyptian values that Egyptians had established thousands of years ago as a result of economic openness. In this regard, the 1981 film Case against the 1981 film Anonymous was presented by Medhat El sebai, in this black comedy film, which revolves around a humble policeman accused of conspiring with thieves, who stole one of the pyramids, the film attacks the misuse of Egyptian antiquities. While the police search for a scapegoat to blame for the crime and use the opportunity to suppress political opposition.

Famous names of Egyptian actors have often been compared to Hollywood stars: Hend Rostom became "the Eastern Marilyn Monroe"; Rushdi Abaza "Clark Gable"; Mahmoud el-Meliguy "Anthony Quinn of the East"; Salah Zulfikar "Cary Grant", Anwar Wagdi "Robert Taylor". In general, the Egyptian public and press like to give their stars nicknames, such as Soad Hosny "the Cinderella of Egyptian cinema", Salah Zulfikar "The knight of dreams", Shoukry Sarhan "Son of the Nile", and "the screen monster" Farid Shawqi, Shadia "the pinnacle of Egyptian cinema".

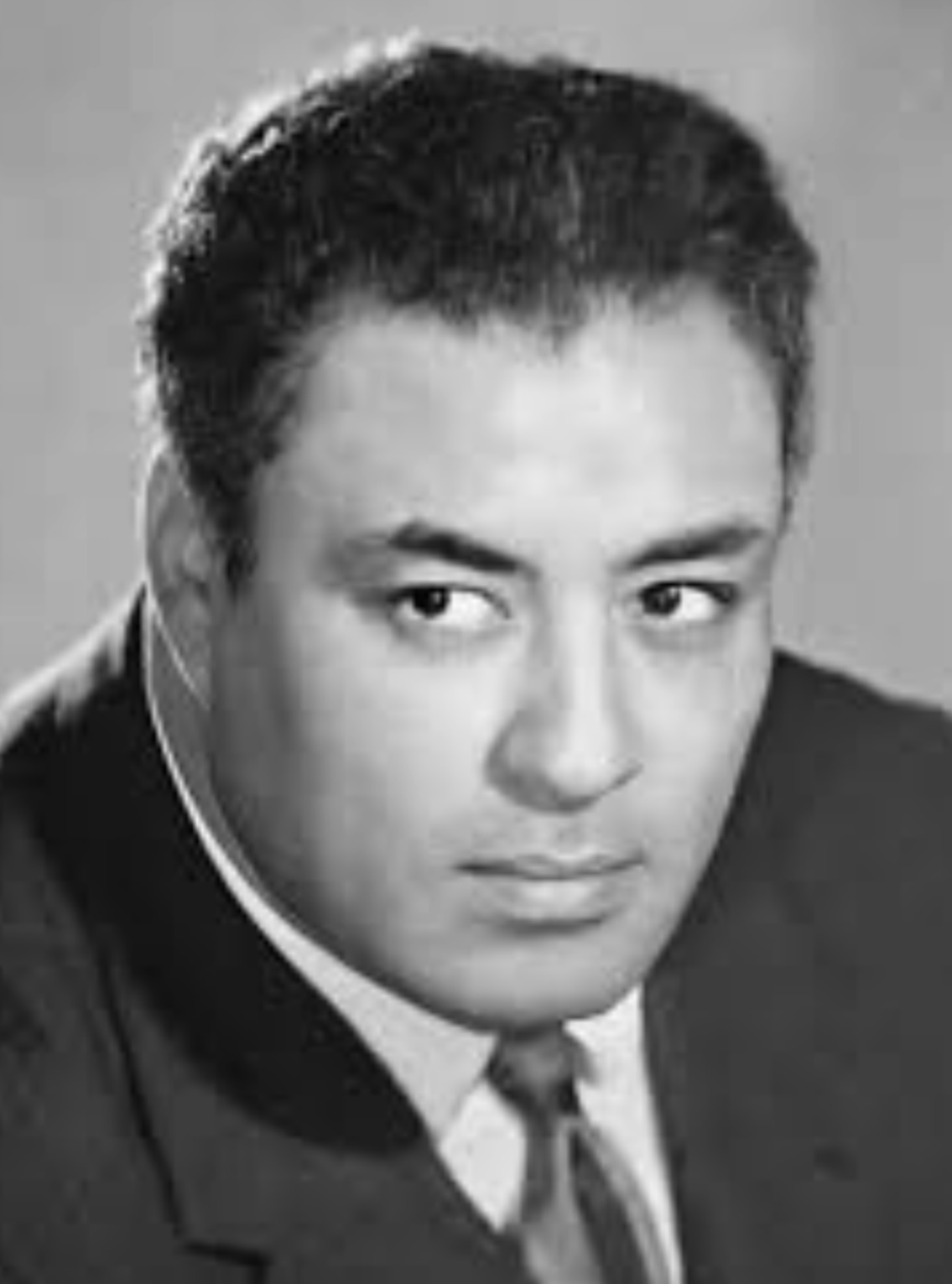
Hassan El-Imam, Egyptian filmmaker

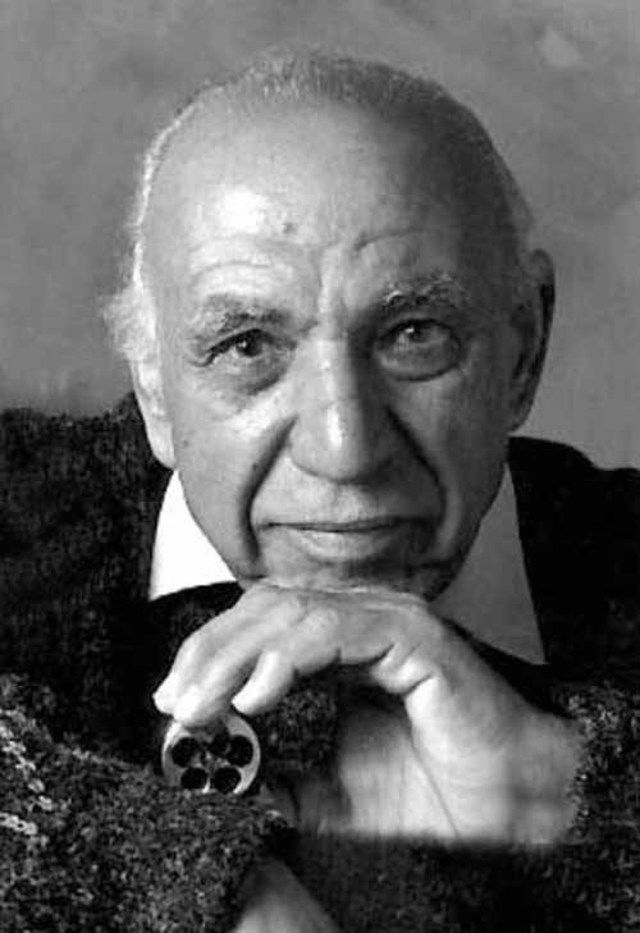
Salah Abu Seif, Egyptian filmmaker

Even film directors were given nicknames such as; Mohammed Karim as the "pioneer", Hassan el-Imam as the box-office king and the "director of masterpieces", Ezz El-Din Zulfikar as the "poet of the camera", Mahmoud Zulfikar as the "art engineer", Henry Barakat as the "sheikh of directors", Salah Abu Seif as The "Realist", Kamal El Sheikh as "King of Suspense" and other titles.

In the 2020s, Egyptian film industry is witnessing a dilemma, as many filmmakers are filming their works outside Egypt, such as producer Mohamed Hefzy, who is currently filming his films abroad due to high fees of locations and even difficulties in extracting permits for filming in Egypt. This would greatly impact the industry. In an attempt by the Syndicate of Cinema Professions and the Chamber of Film Industry to address this crisis and the problem that threatens the film industry in Egypt, writer and producer Farouk Sabry, head of the Chamber of Film Industry, said: "As producers, when we film our films in archaeological and tourist sites, they must be free because then we will dazzle the world." "We are doing free propaganda for our country." He added: "The film makers are currently placing a wooden sign with the words Cairo Airport on it anywhere in the Media Production City for filming, to indicate Cairo Airport, because they cannot film in the real place." Sabry stressed that canceling photography fees contributes to the freedom of the writer and director in creativity, the realism of events, and showing all the required locations in the work. This also contributes to supporting and revitalizing tourism by displaying ancient and modern civilizations, and showing all stages of development, urbanization, and renaissance that the country has witnessed, especially after the development of slums.

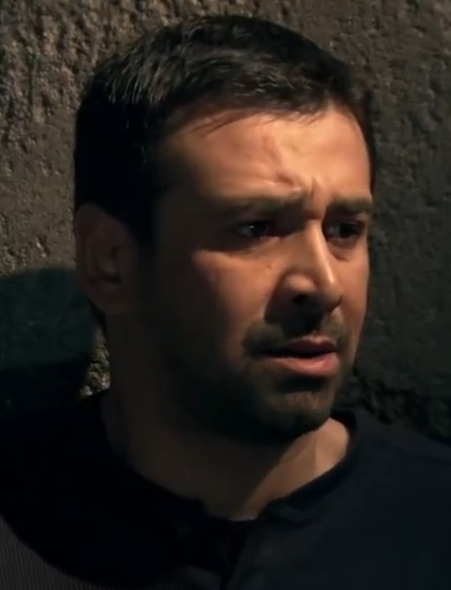
Karim Abdel Aziz, Egyptian film star

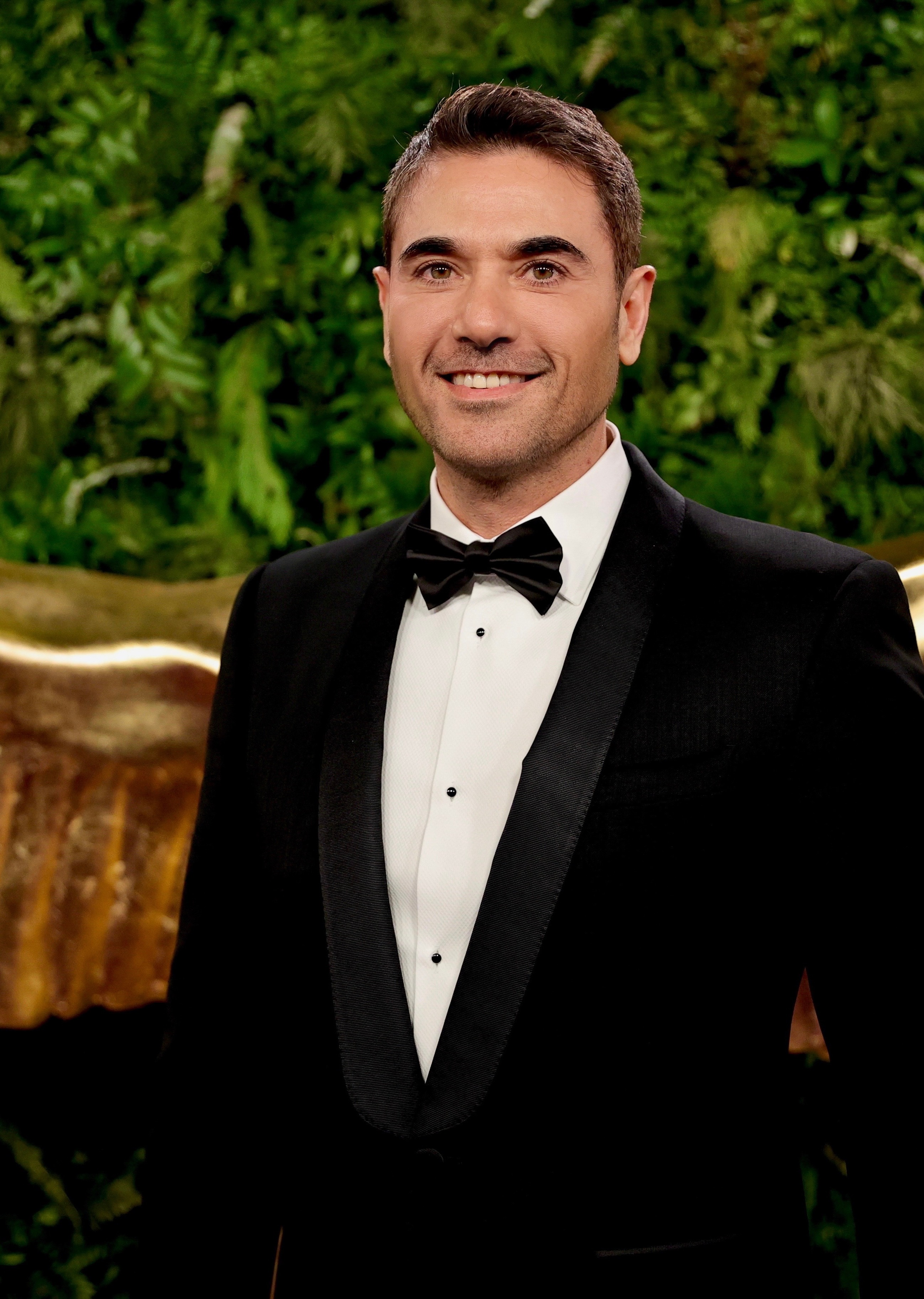
Ahmed Ezz, Egyptian film star

Commercially, Egypt nowadays have several bankable stars, for the last two decades, box-office performers are generally the same, except some new comers of younger generations. Egyptian cinema revenues are split roughly in equal half's between Egyptian films and American films, varying slightly from year to year, according to Egyptian Center for Economic and Social Rights Article, which charted ticket sales from 2015 to 2019. In 2019, cinemas generated EGP 1.2 billion in revenue, up from EGP 843 million the previous year. In 2019, 33 Egyptian films were made, raking in USD 72 million (c. EGP 1.1 billion), a modest number compared to say, 2000 Bollywood films in 2018 and 660 American films in 2017). It is, however, still the highest in the Middle East, according to ECES. In 2020, that number increased by EGP 143 million (USD 9.1 million).

== Significance ==
Of the over 4,000 short and feature-length films made in MENA region between 1908 and 2007, more than three-quarters were Egyptian films. Egypt is the most productive country in the Middle East in the field of film production, and the one with the most developed media system. Despite its successes, the Egyptian film industry faced many challenges, including the struggle to maintain its unique voice and the struggle to maintain creative freedom with many censorship prohibitions, whether social, religious or political. However, Egyptian cinema is the most vibrant and popular in the Middle East and North Africa.

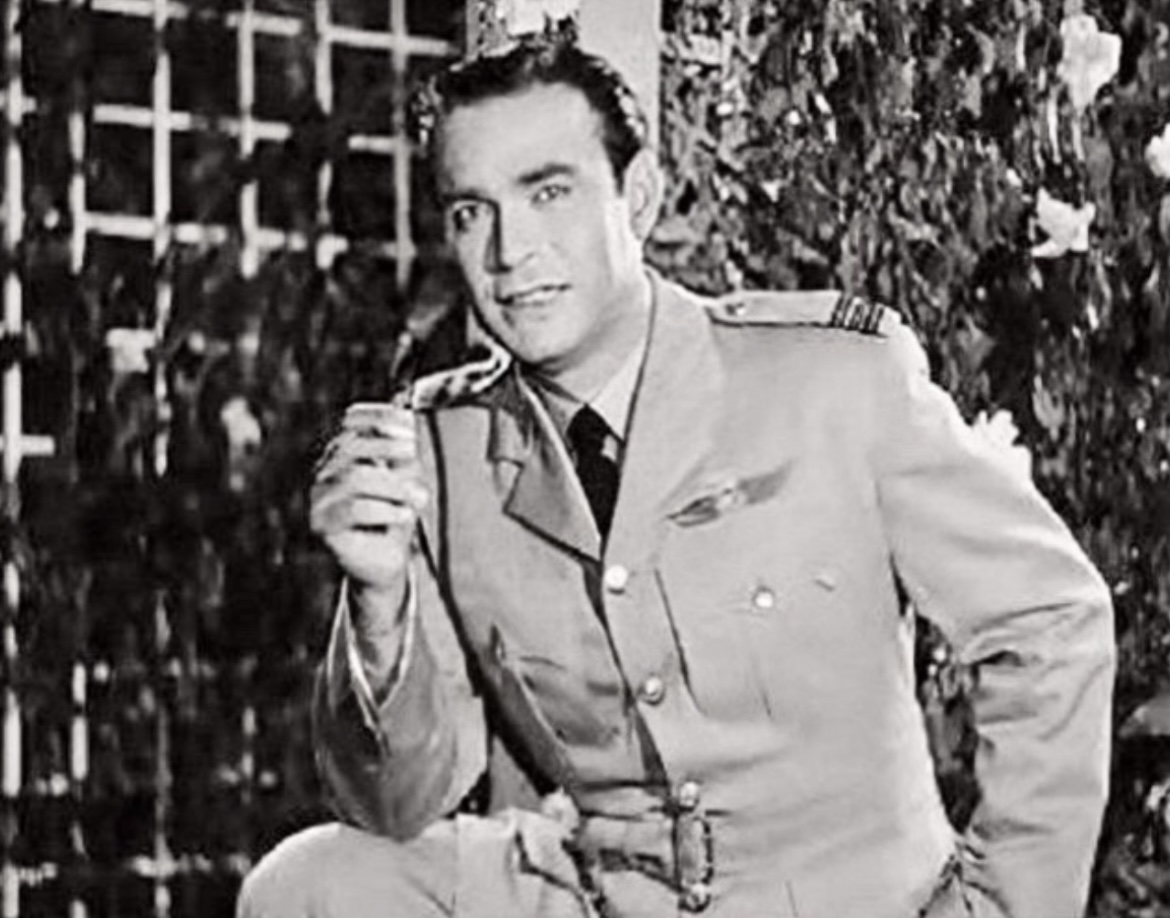
Mahmoud Zulfikar in A Girl from Palestine (1948)

Along with a long history, Egyptian cinema has a unique style. Egyptian films and cinematography set a different standard. Arabs like the Egyptian films, besides the dominant Hollywood films, Arabic audience see the Egyptian society through their films. Also, supporting the Palestinian cause through films gained sympathy with the industry as a whole. The first film to address the Palestinian cause was the 1948 film A Girl from Palestine, directed by and starring Mahmoud Zulfikar, and Soad Muhammad in the leading female role. Another film that tackled the issue was Land of Heroes in 1953, directed by Niazi Mustafa, which discussed the problem of corrupt weapons in the 1948 Arab–Israeli War. Other several films discussed the Palestinian cause such as the 1999 film A Girl From Israel starring Mahmoud Yassin and Farouk El Fishawy.

Over the past two decades the politics of Egyptian cinema have been shaped by broader issues such as economic globalization and concepts of national identity. Some films have addressed overtly political themes, including the American Dream injustices inflicted on the Palestinians, and Islamist protest movements. The character of such films is often strongly influenced by the overarching context in which they are produced, such as; Closed Doors in 1999. "Egyptian cinema is different in many aspects," says Sherif El Bendary, an Egyptian filmmaker with over two decades of experience in the industry."It is the only one in the region that can be labelled as an industry. And by that, I mean investing money and generating revenue." Egyptian director and cinematographer Mohamed Siam says that "Egyptian cinema's rich history and uncertain future is what makes it so dynamic, There is a lot of local talent with new underground filmmakers aspiring to get involved with their innovative projects."

While the Arab world at the time was in a state of turmoil under the colonization of the leading European countries, the film industry in Egypt was the only source for fame, wealth and a stable life for many of actors and actresses, escaping wars, family conflicts, colonization, drought, and famine – seeing Egypt as the "Eldorado of the Middle East" and the famous studios as its last hope for survival.

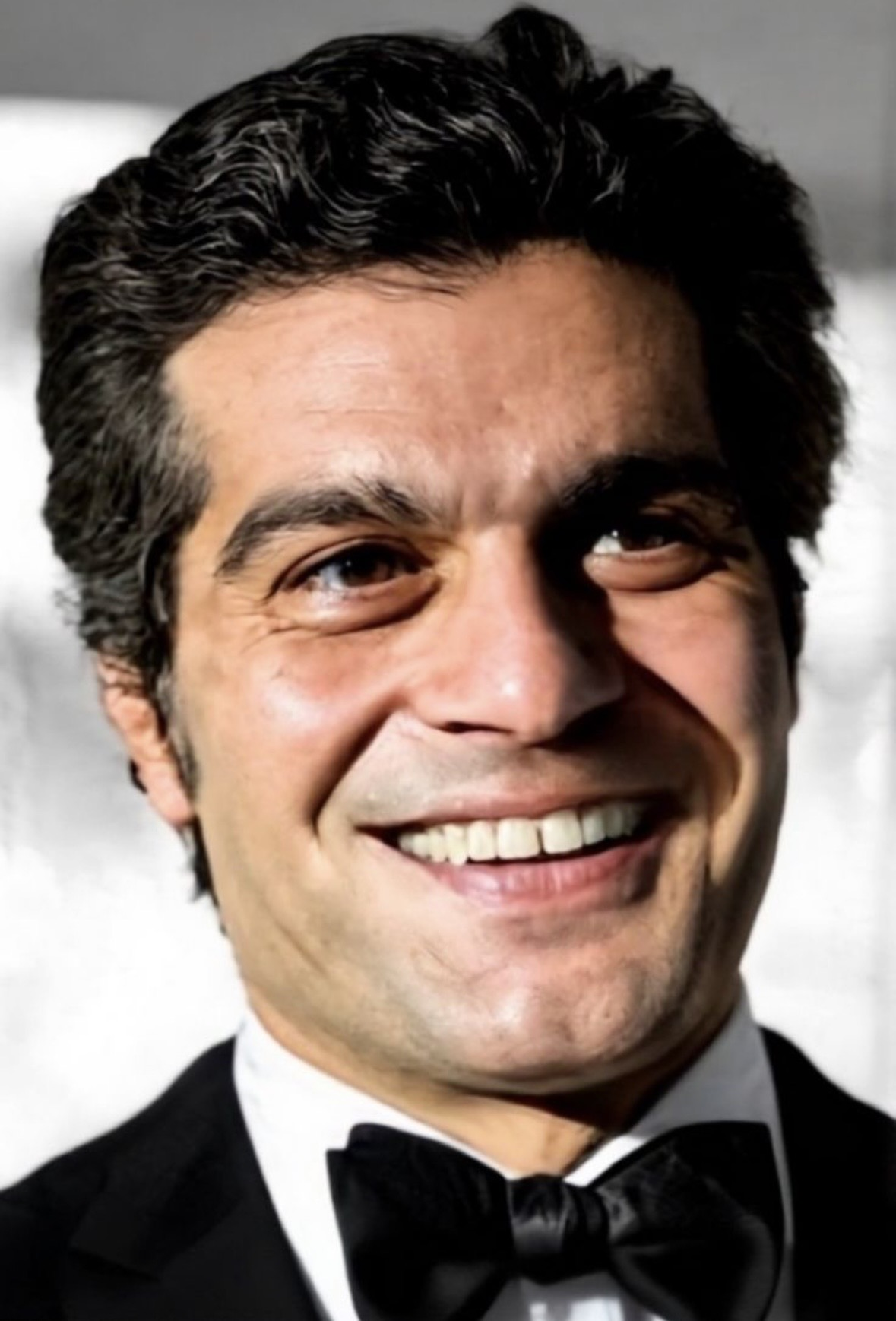
Omar Sharif, Egyptian film star

Egyptian film industry was never connected to Hollywood, inspired and affected but not connected, it is a regional force, maybe a film star such as Omar Sharif performed in Cairo and Hollywood and few others, but Egyptian actors mainly are always content with their success and fame on the regional level whether African or Arab, on the contrary of Tunisian and Moroccan industries for instance, however, filmmakers are different regarding their own keenness for international audiences such as Youssef Chahine and Mohamed Diab.

Despite that, Cairo still tops the list of cinematic performances in Egypt and the Arab world. The Arab world can see different worlds with those who speak a language close to its language, which is the Egyptian Arabic, through which it recognizes the existence of a rich, ancient, and complete civilization that once ruled the world. Moreover, a recent study in 2019 on the Disney animated feature film Monsters Inc., discussed the dubbing of this film in Modern Standard Arabic (MSA) vs. Egyptian vernacular (EV). At its release in 2001, Monsters Inc. gained worldwide reception and positive acclaim to all ages, and its dubbing in Egyptian Vernacular gained similar success in international markets. Twelve years later, in 2013, Monsters Inc. was dubbed by Disney in Modern Standard Arabic (MSA) to cater to a wider Arabic-speaking audience. To their surprise, this version of the animation feature film received negative feedback from audiences due to its lack of sense of humour compared to the EV version.

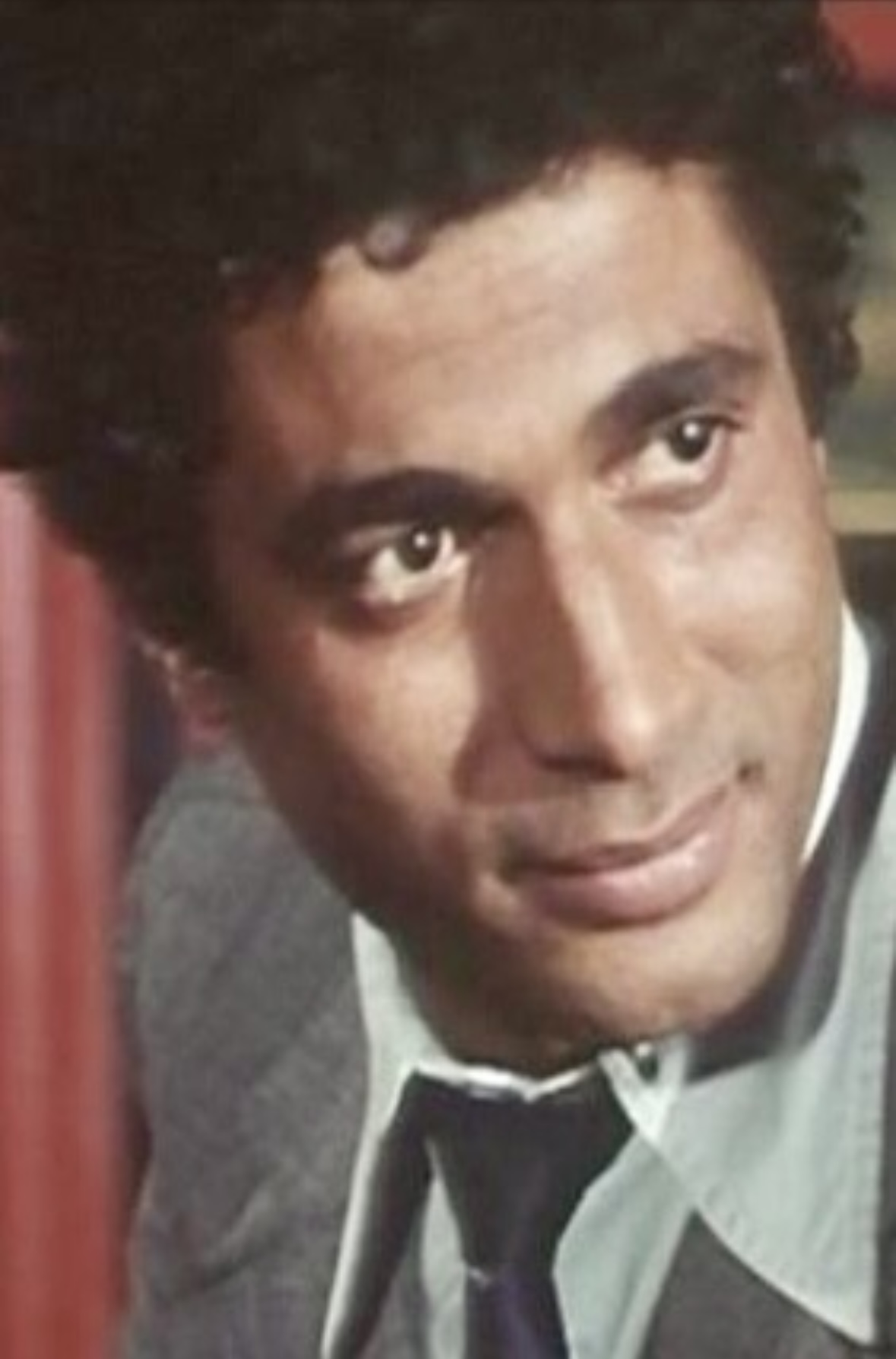
Ahmed Zaki, Egyptian film star

Many efforts were made through films to reflect the values and identity of Egyptian society, specifically average modern Egyptian citizen. Ahmed Zaki has perfectly portrayed low and middle class society in multiple film roles throughout the 1980s and 1990s, making him a huge bankable star. In this era, other film stars excelled in such type of films addressing this class such as Nour El-Sherif, Adel Emam and Mahmoud Abdel Aziz.

The themes of the movies were also of a huge influence on the Arab mentality. There was a cultural and political awareness of the Arab issues, and they were analyzed and discussed through the films. Historically speaking, their cinema contributed in transforming the best of the Islamic and folkloric heritage ingrained within us into memorable flashes of pictures, worth thousands of words. Socially speaking, their cinema addressed many issues related to illiteracy, poverty, crime, the clash between social classes, crimes of honor and others. Psychologically, they showed a deep sight and a sharp knowledge of human nature through unveiling the geneses of human relationships, emotions and psyche.

== Role of women ==
Egyptian cinema is considered one of few industries in the world that has a woman as its pioneer, women had a prominent role in Egyptian film, whether in acting, singing, directing, or even creating the soundtrack. Many of these women emerged in Egypt and marked their place in history. The 1927 film Laila was the first Egyptian feature-length film, produced by and starring Aziza Amir, one of the pioneers of the Egyptian film industry.

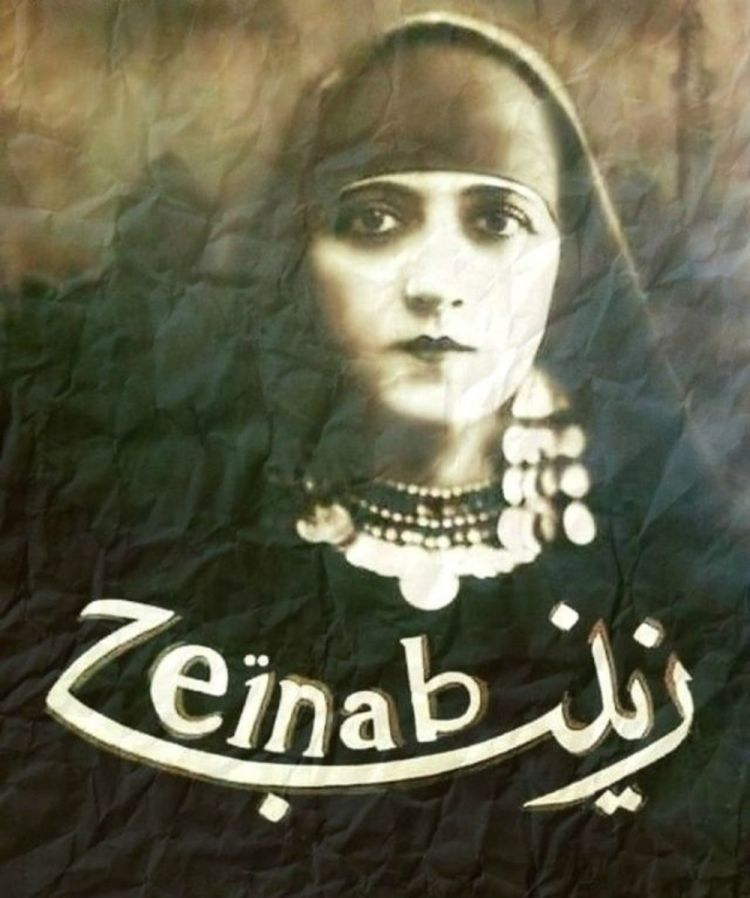
Bahiga Hafez in Zaynab (1930)

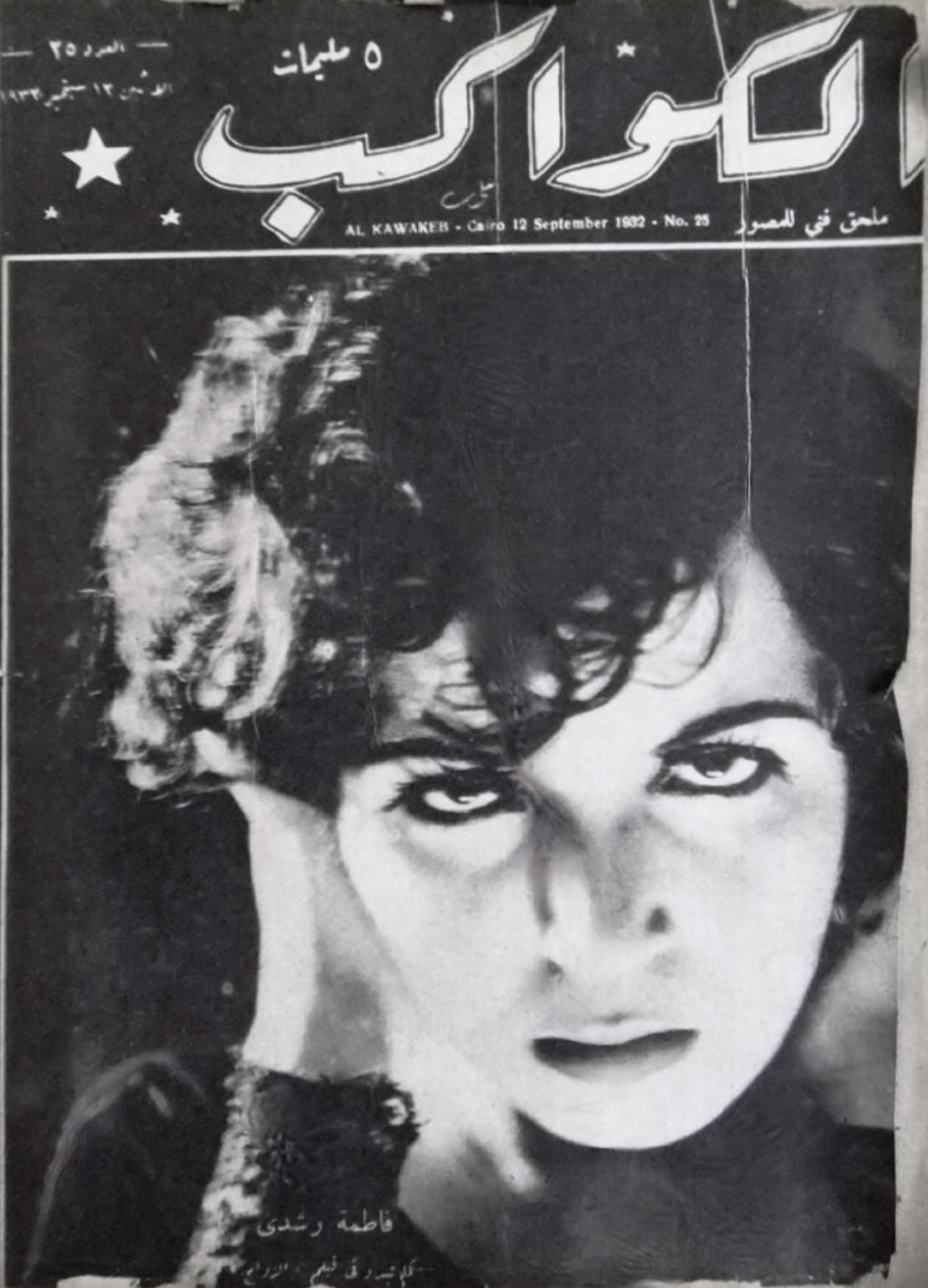
Fatima Rushdi on the cover of Al-Kawakib magazine, September 1932

Bahiga Hafez played the lead role and created the soundtrack of Zaynab, the 1930 film based on a novel of the same name by Mohammed Hussein Heikal and produced by Youssef Wahbi and directed by Mohammed Karim. Fatima Rushdi was one of the pioneers of theatre in writing, directing and acting, and her band was famous. Afterwards, she became a movie star, and her beginning in cinema was through the 1928 film A Tragedy Above the Pyramid, and The Marriage in 1932. Her most notable role was in the 1939 film The Will, which is considered the first in the list of the Top 100 Egyptian films in the history of Egyptian cinema.

Egyptian belly dancer and film actress Samia Gamal is credited with bringing belly dancing from Egypt to Hollywood and from there to the schools of Europe. In 1954, she famously starred as a belly dancer in the American Eastmancolor adventure film, Valley of the Kings, and the French film Ali Baba and the Forty Thieves.

From the early stages of Egyptian cinema, women assumed leadership positions, helping build and develop the new industry in the 1900s. Despite, the heavy hand of the state in leading the industry, introducing men in the management positions, women were adopted as a symbol of nationalism. The list of Egyptian cinema pioneers includes many names. Assia Dagher was called "The Iron Lady" as she produced over 50 films for Egyptian cinema and won many awards. Egyptian actress Bushra said in a press release; "Egyptians are proud that the first nucleus of cinema in Egypt was led by women".

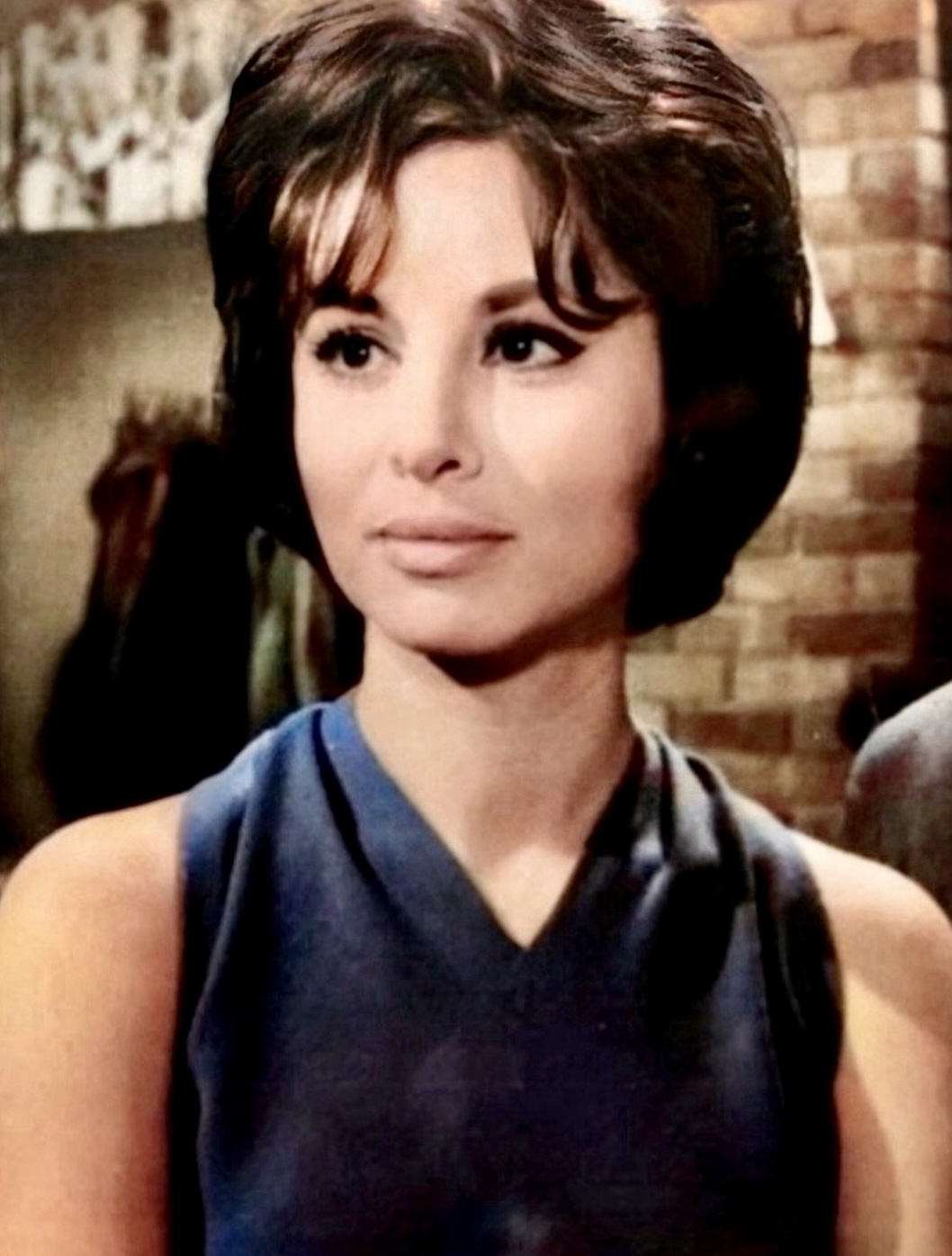
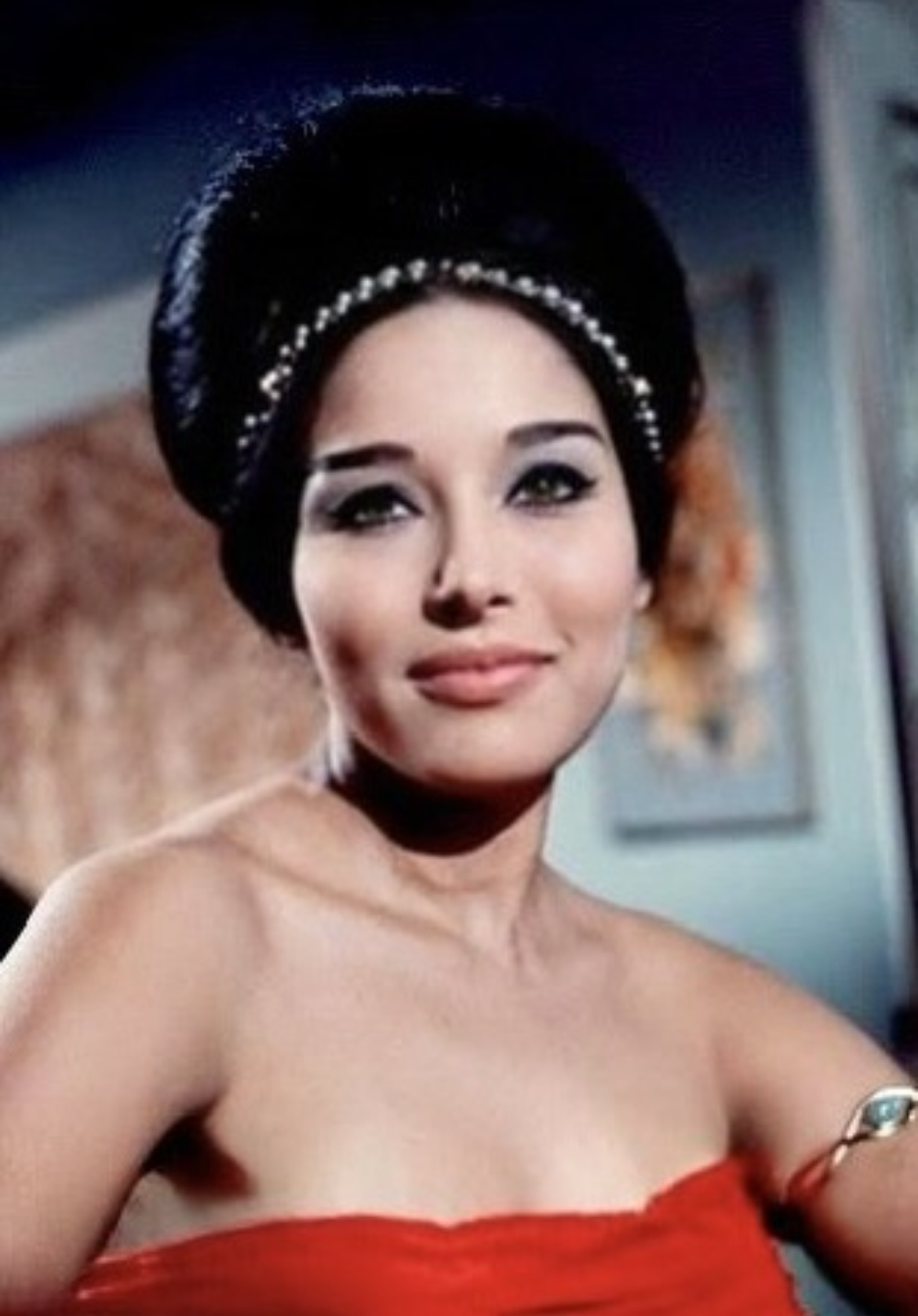
Faten Hamama and Lobna Abdel Aziz, Egyptian film stars

Egyptian cinema occupied a distinguished position on the international scene, and its female stars won several awards. In this regard, Spanish actress Cuca Escribano stated: "I know that Egyptian cinema has a long history, just as is the case with Indian cinema, but unfortunately very few Egyptian films reach us." She added: "And let me add something that I knew here in Egypt, which is that the role of women in the beginning of Egyptian cinema was great, while in Spain, fifty years ago, the percentage of women's participation in the Spanish film industry may not have exceeded ten percent." In the golden age of the industry, a number of films played a significant role in portraying the important role of women in society, discussed women societal problems, offered solutions and even change mind sets. In the 1940s, film industry expanded in Egypt and the names of female cinema pioneers emerged, especially in production and acting. Prominent women contributed to presenting women's issues and social concerns as main topics for public discussion through distinguished cinematic works. In the 1950s, through a new generation of actresses such as Faten Hamama in the 1952 film Miss Fatimah, produced by Mahmoud Zulfikar and directed by Fatin Abdel Wahab, where the female lead role was able to work as a lawyer encouraging the women to tackle males in their areas of expertise at the time. Lobna Abdel Aziz in her 1959 films I Am Free, plays a college girl who is frustrated with the predominantly male patriarchal system in Egypt at the time, the film captures much of the feminist sentiments of the 1960s and its widespread in Egypt. The men in her life further reinforce the themes of male dominance in the film with their restriction on her life.

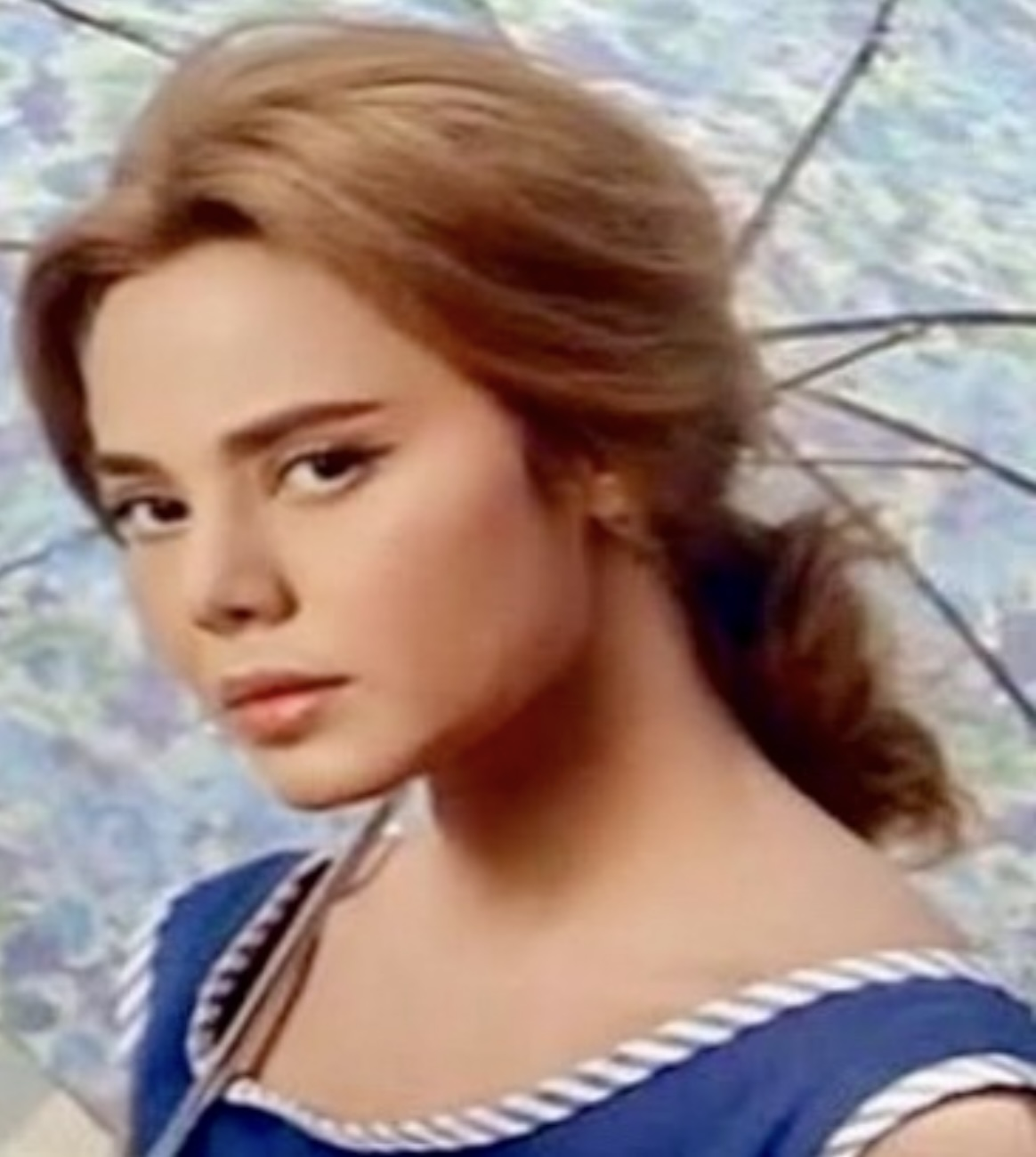
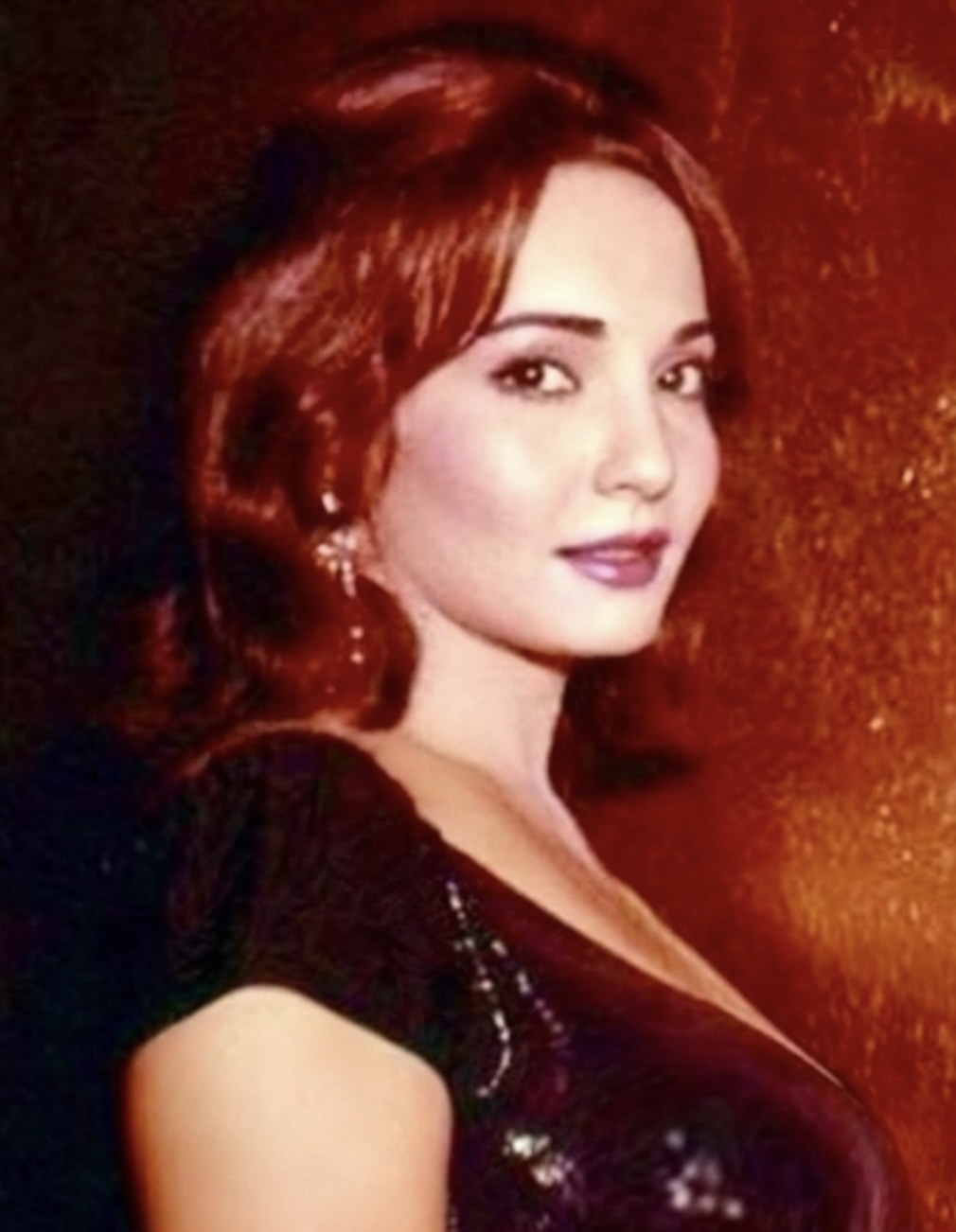
Magda, starred in Teenagers (1961), the film discussed women equality through the lead role of a teenaged girl and Shadia, starred in A Taste of Fear (1969), which encountered female suppression

In the 1961 film Teenagers, starring and produced by Magda, the film deals with suppressed Egyptian teenagers and how old fashioned ways can lead to even the death of such girls who need to be understood. Soad Hosny, the "Cinderella of Egyptian Cinema", starred as well in several films portraying concerns of Egyptian women such as; the 1967 film The Second Wife by Salah Abu Seif.

Other notable films of the 1960s discussing gender equality include the 1964 film For Men Only by Mahmoud Zulfikar, the film stars Nadia Lutfi and Soad Hosny in the leading roles. The film encounters the ban of women from working in Oil drills, and the two girls disguised in men appearances to go to work in the drill.

In the 1966 film A Wife from Paris by Atef Salem, the Bedouin women social issues are discussed and how men in these areas refuse to send their wives to a male doctor, the film criticizes the old ways of treating women. In the 1969 film A Taste of Fear directed by Hussein Kamal and produced by Salah Zulfikar. The female lead role played by Shadia faces the suppression of the mayor to marry her without her permission, and she fights for her freedom.

In the 1970s, the 1975 film I Want a Solution, produced by Salah Zulfikar and directed by Said Marzouk, and starring Faten Hamama, the film encounters the social laws for women asking for divorce. The laws eventually were changed in Egypt in favor of women. In the 1980s and 1990s, films discussing women rights declined, however some films discussed women social status were released in this period such as the 1994 film Cheap Flesh by Inas El Deghidy, the film discussed the marriage of young girls to rich old Arabs.

Between the 1970s and 1980s, Egyptian cinema started to explore more daring topics such as cohabitation, homosexuality, and social power. An example of that is Madness of Youth (1975) about Salwa, a young lady who figures out her father is involved with corruption in their family business; she joins other young people rebelling against their families and society, and Esmat, who reveals that she is homosexual, after the inciting incident of her finding out that her father seemed to make money out of her body and her sisters alike. Moreover, in the '80s, post-Egypt signed a CIDAW treaty that protects women's rights; the concept of gender spiked concerns and sarcasm from the general public. Two films were released in the late 80s that highlight the concept of gender in Egyptian Cinema: Those Gentlemen (1987) and Ladies and Gentlemen (1989) both directed by Raafat El-Mihi. The first film takes a fantasy approach to explore transgender surgeries, while the second reverses the power dynamic within the family, empowering the wife instead of the husband.

Furthermore, in the last quarter of the 20th century, governmental influences resulted in a shortage of production resources, and private sector was the main source of production. Although commercial films suffered, social-issue, and realistic films have restored hope for feminist initiatives and put the Egyptian film industry on the path to recover from decline in the early 1980s.

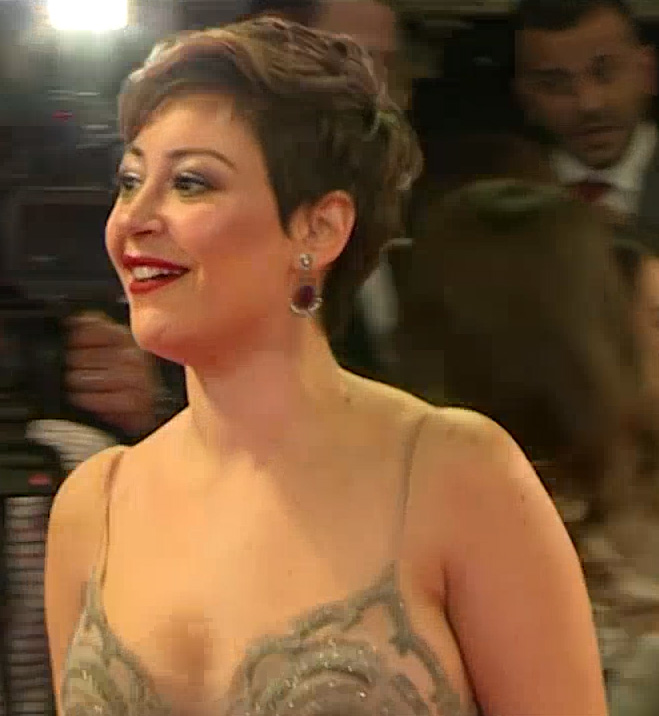
Menna Shalabi, Egyptian film star

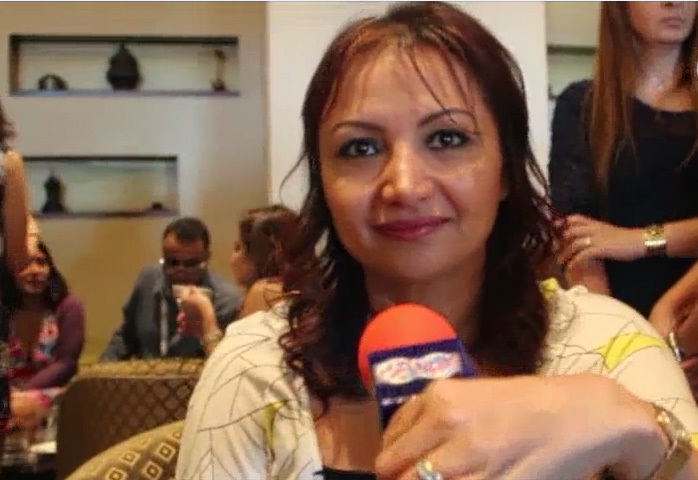
Hala Khalil, Egyptian film director

In the 21st century, several films were speaking about women issues such as Down Town Girls (2005), In the Heliopolis Flat (2007), and Factory Girl (2013), the trilogy by Mohamed Khan. A new generation emerged in this period with new aspects of women rights and new challenges facing women, films in this period encountered female abuse, harassment and un-equality such as the 2009 film Scheherazade, Tell Me a Story by Yousry Nasrallah, starring Mona Zaki. The film discuss the story of several women from different social classes with social suppression and sexual harassment facing them and how this can end with high consequences. The 2010 film 678, produced by Sarah Gohar and directed by Mohamed Diab, and stars Bushra, Nelly Karim and Nahed El Sebai, the film faces the issues of the leading roles regarding miscarriage, sexual abuse and poverty. The 2015 film Nawara by Hala Khalil, starring Menna Shalabi, the film's story revolves around a girl named Nawara who lives a love story during the 2011 revolution in Egypt, showing the impact of what was happening in Egypt during this period on Nawara, her love story, and her work as a maid in the villa of one of the former ministers.

== Festivals ==
Since 1952, Cairo has held the Egyptian Catholic Center for Cinema Festival It is the oldest film festival in the Middle East, and aims "to support filmmaking that transects with human and moral values".

Since 1976, Cairo has held the annual Cairo International Film Festival, which has been accredited by the International Federation of Film Producers Associations (FIAPF).

Other film festivals held in Egypt include:

- Alexandria International Film Festival
- Aswan International Women's Film Festival
- Cairo Cinema Days
- Cairo Francophone Film Festival
- Cairo International Women's Film Festival
- El Gouna Film Festival
- Film Association Festival for Egyptian Cinema
- Ismailia International Film Festival for Documentaries and Shorts
- Luxor African Film Festival
- National Egyptian Film Festival
- Port Said Festival for Arab Films
- Sharm El-Sheikh Film Festival

== Studios ==
Notable film studios past and present in Egypt include:

- Studio Misr, a film studio established in Giza. In 1935, the economist Talaat Harb established a studio owned and staffed by Egyptians, it is known as "The Studio of Egypt". It is the Egyptian equivalent to Hollywood's major studios. Their first venture was Weddad, starring Umm Kulthum and directed by Fritz Kramp.
- Al-Ahram Studio, in the Giza district of Cairo, was established in 1944, and was one of the oldest in the world 80 years later, when it was destroyed by fire in 2024. It was 27,000 m^{2} (290,000 sq ft) in extent, and contained three production stages, a screening room, and an editing suite. Many films were made there, as well as TV series that were broadcast internationally. The fire damaged the facades of seven adjoining buildings, after breaking out within a day of filming El-Moalem (The Master), a TV series made for Ramadan peak viewing time. The state prosecutor opened an investigation into the cause of the fire, which took six hours to extinguish.
- Nassibian Studio (incorrectly spelt Nassabian or Nasabian in some sources) was built in 1937 by the Syrian-Armenian investor Hrant Nassibian, between Building 12 and Building 14 in Mahrany Street, in the Faggala district of Cairo,. Nassibian put work into developing the industry rather than just make a quick profit. The studios included a set, a film-processing laboratory, and an editing unit; they were smaller than Misr, but very well equipped. Nassibian sold the studios in 1952, after the July revolution, and left the country. and had had produced 145 films by the 1980s. It created serious competition to Studio Misr for the first time. Several films were filmed in the street outside the studio and in the homes of neighbours and in Building 12, including Fi Baytena Ragol (A Man in Our House), directed by Henry Barakat and starring Omar Sharif. The studio was nationalised by the Nasser government in the 1960s and taken over by the state-run Ramses Film Company, which produced fewer and fewer films and became primarily a printing and processing lab. However in the 1970s it produced social comedies such as the 1974 Al-Hafeed (The Grandson), directed by Atef Salem and filmed in Building 12. Others among the approximately 140 films produced by the studio included The Bride of the Nile, The Fatwa, Shafiqa and Metwally, and Bab Al Hadid (Cairo Station, 1958). In the early 1980s the studio was abandoned and was destroyed by fire, apart from one wall. The Jesuit School bought the site and built El Nahda Association for Cultural and Scientific Renaissance (aka Renaissance Society, or Jesuit Cairo), which sponsored the creation of the Jesuit Cinema School. They undertook significant renovations, which included the construction of the Nassabian Theatre. The building, which was regarded as a prominent symbol of culture in the capital, was again gutted by fire in November 2021. At the time, the cinema school was headed by Marwa Abdullah El Sayed.
- Galal Studios was created by Lebanese-born actress and film producer Mary Queeny and her husband Ahmed Galal in 1944, after they had established Galal Films in 1942. The first films shot at the studios were Om al-Saad, Amirat al-Ahlam (Princess of Dreams) and 'Aoudat al-Gha'eb (The Return of the Departed), and it grew to be one of the top five studios in the Golden Age of Egyptian Cinema, before it, too, was nationalised by the Nasser government. Galal directed social dramas, and at least 18 films. After he died suddenly in 1947, Queeny and her son, Nader Galal, continued to run the studio.
- Studio Nahas (or Nahhas) was established by Gabriel Nahas, Youssef Wahby, and Antoine Khoury, and owned by Nahas Films. Built in 1946–7, its first production was Al Hob La Yamout (Love Does Not Die), starring Rakia Ibrahim and Abbas Fares, and directed by Mohammed Karim. It was a major film studio, producing several films written by Youssef Wahbi, and remained in full production until its nationalisation in 1963, when Gabriel Nahas died. It was then renamed Studio El Nil, and incorporated into the government's "Cinema City", although partly reverting to its historical name. In 2016, Studio Nahas was destroyed by fire.

=== Studio district in 2024 ===
After the Al-Ahram fire in February 2024, questions were raised about public safety, with so many film studios grouped in a densely populated residential area within the governorates of Cairo and Giza. These include(d) Galal, in the Hadayek Al-Qubba area, and Al-Ahram, The Nile, Misr, and Nahhas studios ib Al-Haram Street, in relatively close proximity, and Misk on Faisal Street. The Academy of Arts is also close by, in an area which was undeveloped agricultural land when the studios were constructed. The head of the Federation of Artistic Syndicates, director Omar Abdel Aziz, and other industry leaders, called on the government to give the matter high priority and to consider moving the studios out of urban areas.

== Notable people ==
=== Directors ===
- Ahmed Badrakhan (1909–1969)
- Ahmed Diaa Eddine (1912–1976)
- Amr Salama (1982–)
- Anwar Wagdi (1904–1955)
- Ali Badrakhan (1946–)
- Asma El Bakry (1947–2015)
- Atef El Tayeb (1947–1995)
- Ayten Amin (1978–)
- Bahiga Hafez (1908–1983)
- Daoud Abdel Sayed (1946–)
- Ezz El-Dine Zulficar (1919–1963)
- Fatin Abdel Wahab (1913–1972)
- Hala Khalil (1967–)
- Hassan el-Imam (1919–1988)
- Helmy Rafla (1909–1978)
- Henry Barakat (1912–1997)
- Hussein Kamal (1932–2003)
- Inas El-Degheidy (1953–)
- Kamla Abou Zekry (1974–)
- Karim Diaa El-Din (1946–2021)
- Kamal El Sheikh (1919–2004)
- Khairy Beshara (1947–)
- Khaled Youssef (1964–)
- Maher Sabry (1967–)
- Mahmoud Zulfikar (1914–1970)
- Marwan Hamed (1977–)
- Mohamed Amin (1961–)
- Mohamed Diab (1978–)
- Mohamed Khan (1942–2016)
- Mohammed Karim (1896–1972)
- Morad Mostafa (1988–)
- Niazi Mostafa (1911–1986)
- Peter Mimi (1987–)
- Salah Abu Seif (1915–1996)
- Samir Seif (1947–2019)
- Shady Abdel Salam (1930–1986)
- Sherif Arafa (1960–)
- Tamer El Said (1972–)
- Tewfik Saleh (1926–2013)
- Yousry Nasrallah (1952–)
- Youssef Chahine (1926–2008)
- Youssef Wahbi (1898–1982)

=== Actors ===
- Abdelhalim Hafez (1929–1977)
- Abdel Moneim Madbouly (1921–2006)
- Adel Emam (1940–)
- Ahmed El-Fishawy (1980–)
- Ahmed El Sakka (1973–)
- Ahmed Ezz (1971–)
- Ahmed Helmy (1969–)
- Ahmed Malek (1995–)
- Ahmed Mazhar (1917–2002)
- Ahmed Mekky (1978–)
- Ahmad Zaki (1949–2005)
- Amina Khalil (1988–)
- Amina Rizk (1910–2003)
- Anwar Wagdi (1904–1955)
- Asser Yassin (1981–)
- Athar El-Hakim (1957–)
- Aziza Amir (1901–1952)
- Bahiga Hafez (1908–1983)
- Donia Samir Ghanem (1985–)
- Elham Shahin (1961–)
- Emad Hamdy (1909–1984)
- Ezzat El Alaili (1934–2021)
- Ezz El-Dine Zulficar (1919–1963)
- Farid al-Atrash (1915–1974)
- Farid Shawky (1920–1998)
- Farouk al-Fishawy (1952–2019)
- Faten Hamama (1931–2015)
- Fatima Rushdi (1908–1996)
- Fuad Al Mohandes (1924–2006)
- Ghada Adel (1974–)
- Hana El Zahed (1994–)
- Hend Rostom (1929–2011)
- Hend Sabry (1979–)
- Huda El-Mufti (1994–)
- Hussein el-Imam (1951–2014)
- Hussein Fahmy (1940–)
- Ismail Yasin (1912–1972)
- Karim Abdel Aziz (1975–)
- Karim Mahmoud Abdel Aziz (1985–)
- Khaled Abol Naga (1966–)
- Laila Elwi (1962–)
- Layla Murad (1918–1995)
- Laila Taher (1942–)
- Lebleba (1945–)
- Madiha Kamel (1948–1997)
- Madiha Yousri (1921–2018)
- Maged el-Kedwany (1967–)
- Magda El-Khatib (1943–2006)
- Magda (1931–2020)
- Mahmoud Abdel Aziz (1946–2016)
- Mahmoud Yassin (1941–2020)
- Mahmoud Zulfikar (1914–1970)
- Mariam Fakhr Eddine (1933–2014)
- Mary Queeny (1913–2003)
- Menna Shalabi (1982–)
- Mervat Amin (1946–)
- Mohamed Abdel Wahab (1902–1991)
- Mohamed Emam (1984–)
- Mohamed Henedi (1965–)
- Mohamed Saad (1968–)
- Mona Zaki (1976–)
- Mounira El Mahdeya (1885–1965)
- Nahed El Sebai (1987–)
- Nabila Ebeid (1945–)
- Nadia Al-Gindi (1946–)
- Nadia Lutfi (1937–2020)
- Nagat El-Sagheera (1938–)
- Naglaa Fathi (1951–)
- Naguib Al Rihani (1889–1949)
- Naima Akef (1932–1966)
- Nelly (1951–)
- Nelly Karim (1974–)
- Nelly Mazloum (1929–2003)
- Nour El-Sherif (1946–2015)
- Omar Sharif (1932–2015)
- Poussi (1953–)
- Rami Said Malek (1981–)
- Ruby (1981–)
- Rushdy Abaza (1926–1980)
- Sabah (1921–2014)
- Safia El Emari (1949–)
- Salah Zulfikar (1926–1993)
- Samia Gamal (1924–1994)
- Samir Ghanem (1937–2021)
- Sanaa Gamil (1932–2002)
- Shadia (1929–2017)
- Shams al-Baroudi (1945–)
- Sherihan (1964–)
- Shukry Sarhan (1925–1997)
- Shwikar (1939–2020)
- Soad Hosny (1943–2001)
- Soher El Bably (1937–2021)
- Soheir Ramzi (1949–)
- Tahiya Carioca (1920–1999)
- Tamer Hosny (1977–)
- Tara Emad (1993–)
- Umm Kulthum (1898–1975)
- Yasmin Abdulaziz (1980–)
- Yasmin Raeis (1985–)
- Youssef Wahbi (1898–1982)
- Yousuf Shaaban (1931–2021)
- Yosra El Lozy (1985–)
- Yousra (1955–)
- Zaki Rostom (1903–1972)
- Zahret El-Ola (1934–2013)

=== Cinematographers ===
- Fouad Said (1933–)
- Mahmoud Nasr
- Tarek El-Telmissany (1950–)
- Wahid Farid (1919–1998)

=== Film critics ===
- Iris Nazmy
- Mona El-Saghir
- Nura Amin (1970–)
- Salwa Bakr (1949–)
- Samir Farid (1943–2017)
- Tarek El Shennawi

=== Music composers ===
- Ammar El Sherei (1948–2012)
- Ali Ismael (1922–1974)
- Fouad Al-Zahery (1916–1988)
- Moody El Imam (1957–)
- Omar Khairat (1948–)
- Rageh Daoud (1954–)
- Hesham Nazih (1972–)

== See also ==
- Arab cinema
- Culture of Egypt
- Higher Institute of Cinema
- Lists of Egyptian films
