= A Resident of the City =

2011 film

Raj Kohli
- Directed by: Adham El Sherif
- Screenplay by: Atef Nashed
- Produced by: Adham El Sherif, Higher Institute of Cinema
- Edited by: Islam Amer
- Release date: 2011
- Running time: 15 minutes
- Country: Egypt

A Resident of the City is a 2011 Egyptian film directed by Adham El Sherif.

== Theme ==
In the city, some lead a privileged life, whilst others are mere labour. There are those who live a wretched existence, but at least are free to live a dog's life in the Egyptian capital.
