= Nura Amin =

Egyptian writer and choreographer

Nora Amin
- نورا أمين
- Born: July 4, 1970 (age 56); Cairo, Egypt
- Education: Cairo University
- Occupations: Novelist, Short story writer, Translator, Critic, Choreographer
- Writing career
- Language: Arabic, French, English
- Genres: Fiction, Literary criticism
- Notable work: [Short Story Collection] (Prize-winning)
- Notable awards: General Authority for Culture Palaces Short Story Prize (1996); *Best Novel Award (Andalusiya Foundation, 1999)

Nora Amin (Arabic: نورا أمين; born 4 July 1970) is an Egyptian novelist, short story writer, and translator.

A native of Cairo, Amin received her bachelor's degree in French from Cairo University in 1992, and has since worked as a teaching assistant at the Academy of Arts, in the Center for Languages and Translation. She has published a number of translations into Arabic from English and French. As a writer, she received the short-story prize from the General Authority for Culture Palaces in 1996; three years later she won the prize for the best novel by a writer under the age of forty which was offered by the Andalusiya Foundation for Culture and Arts. Amin has also been active as a film, theater, and literary critic for Al Ahali and for al-Hilal.
