= Karim Diaa Eddin =

Egyptian film director and actor from Cairo

Karim Diaa Eddine
- Citizenship: Egypt
- Education: American University of Cairo
- Occupation: film director
- Notable work: Minister in Plaster; Ismailia Round Trip; Loves and Terror

Karim Diaa Eddine is an Egyptian film director and actor from Cairo. A business graduate of the American University of Cairo, he worked as an assistant director in France for three years. Notable films include Loves and Terror (1992), Minister in Plaster (1993), Ismailia Round Trip (1997), Hassan and Aziza:State Security Case (1999) and In Arabic, Cindarella (2006).
