= Inas El-Degheidy =

Egyptian film director (born 1953)

Inas El Degheidy
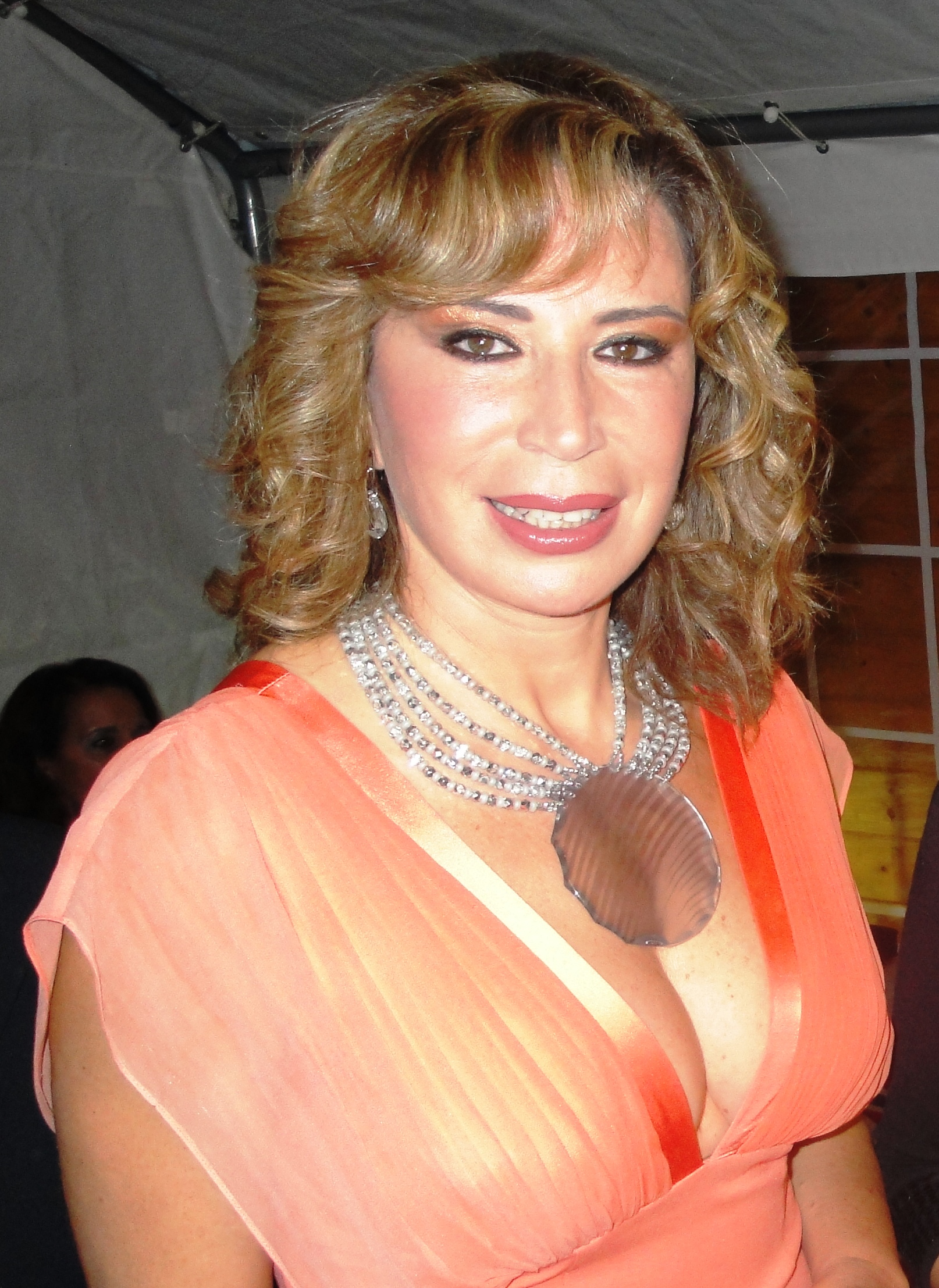
- Born: 10 March 1953 (age 73); Cairo
- Citizenship: Egypt
- Occupation: Film director
- Notable work: Night Talk, 2002

Inas El Degheidy (born 10 March 1953) is an Egyptian film director.

Inas directs films of social and realistic essence, often by using explicit scenes; this has made her being labelled as "controversial". While her films often analyze women's struggles in society, she does not like the term "women's cinema".

== Life ==
Inas El Degheidy was born in Cairo, one of eight children of a conservative, middle-class family. Her father taught Arabic. while he was strict, he was the only one to support her in her family when she wanted to go to film school. She graduated from the Cinema Institute in 1975, and directed her first film Pardon Law in 1985.

Her movie Al-Samt (Silence) tackles the subject of a woman sexually abused by her father. The Egyptian Board of Censors has demanded that the script be modified to ensure the father is portrayed as mentally diseased and thus unrepresentative of the general Egyptian male figure.

== Films ==
- `Afwan ayuha al-qanun (Pardon, Law), 1985
- al-Tahhadi (The Challenge), 1988
- Zaman al-mamnu` (Age of the Forbidden), 1988
- Imra`a wahida la takfi (One Woman is Not Enough), 1990
- Qadiyat Samiha Badran (The Case of Samiha Badran), 1992
- al-Qatila (Lady Killer), 1992
- Discu disku (Disco, Disco), 1993
- Lahm rakhis (Cheap Flesh), 1994
- Istakoza (Lobster), 1996
- Dantilla (Lace), 1998. Winner of best director at Pusan Film Festival.
- Kalam al-layl (Night Whispers), 1999
- al-Warda al-hamra (The Red Rose), 2000
- Mudhakkarat murahiqa (Diary of a Teenage Girl), 2001
- Night Talk, 2002
- Al-Bahithat `an al-huriya (Looking for Freedom), 2004
