= List of Egyptian films of the 1970s =

Below are lists of films produced in Egypt in the 1970s.

- List of Egyptian films of 1970
- List of Egyptian films of 1971
- List of Egyptian films of 1972
- List of Egyptian films of 1973
- List of Egyptian films of 1974
- List of Egyptian films of 1975
- List of Egyptian films of 1976
- List of Egyptian films of 1977
- List of Egyptian films of 1978
- List of Egyptian films of 1979
