= List of Egyptian films of 1973 =

A list of films produced in Egypt in 1973. For an A-Z list of films currently on Wikipedia, see Category:Egyptian films.

Title	Director	Cast	Genre	Notes
Al-bahth An Fadiha (Searching for a Scandal)	Niazi Mostafa	Adel Emam, Mervat Amin, Samir Sabry, Youssef Wahbi, Ahmed Ramzy, Emad Hamdy, Mohamed Awad, Zizi El-Badrawy, Mohamed Reda, Nagwa Fouad, George Sidhom, Tewfik El Dekn, Mimi Chakib	Comedy / romance	
El Ragol El Akhar (The Other Man)	Mahamed Bassiouny	Salah Zulfikar, Shams El-Barudy, Kamal El-Shennawi	Action film	
El-Shayateen Wal Kora (Devils and Football)	Mahmoud Farid	Hassan Yousef, Shams El-Barudy, Adel Emam, Emad Hamdy	Comedy / romance	
El Sokkaria				Conclusion of Naguib Mahfouz's Cairo Trilogy
Endama Yoghany El Hob (When the Love Sings)	Niazi Mostafa	Hani Shaker, Nahed Yousri, Adel Emam, Safa Abu Al-Saud	Comedy / romance	
Hammam El-Malatily (El-Malatily Bath)				
Shai' Men Al-Hob (A Bit of Love)	Ahmad Fouad	Nour El-Sherif, Soheir Ramzy, Adel Emam, Lebleba, Sayed Zayan, Tewfik El Dekn	Comedy / romance	
