= Yousuf Shaaban (actor) =

Egyptian actor (1931–2021)

- Born: Youssef Shaaban Shemis; July 16, 1931; Shubra, Egypt
- Died: February 28, 2021 (aged 89); Giza, Egypt
- Occupation: Actor
- Years active: 1958–2021
- Spouses: Laila Taher (divorced) Nadia Chirine (divorced) Seham Fathi (divorced) Iman Shreaan (m. 1989)
- Children: 4

President of the Syndicate of Artists
- In office 1997–2003

Youssef Shaaban Shemis (Arabic: يوسف شعبان شميس; 16 July 1931 (Note: Some sources reported that he was born on 16 July 1936 or 1937.) – 28 February 2021) was an Egyptian actor.

== Career ==
Shaaban initially studied law at Ain Shams University, but he later went to study in the Higher Institute of Dramatic Arts and graduated in 1962. His most famous roles were in There is a Man in our House in 1961 with Omar Sharif and Rushdy Abaza, The Miracle in 1962, Cairo in 1963 with George Sanders and Faten Hamama, Mother of the Bride in 1963 with Taheyya Kariokka, For Men Only in 1964 with Suad Husni and Nadia Lutfi, The Three Loves Her in 1965, My Wife, the Director General in 1966 with Salah Zulfikar and Shadia. The Second Groom in 1967, The Idol of People in 1967 with Abdel Halim Hafez and Shadia, The Man Who Lost His Shadow in 1968 with Salah Zulfikar, Kamal El-Shennawi and Magda, An Incident of Honor in 1971 with Zubaida Tharwat and Shoukry Sarhan, Guys in Storm with Nelly and Nour El-Sherif, Fear Moments in 1972 with Farid Shawqi and Mervat Amin.

In 1972, Shaaban co-starred in Paris and Love with Salah Zulfikar and Sabah. His next role was in Sun and Fog in 1973, A Woman With a Bad Reputation in 1973 with Shams al-Baroudi and Mahmoud Yacine, Malatily Bathhouse in 1973, The Bullet is Still in My Pocket in 1974, The Guilty in 1975 with Hussein Fahmy, Salah Zulfikar and Soheir Ramzi. Days in London in 1976 with Samira Tewfik, Remember Me in 1978 with Naglaa Fathi, The Iron Woman in 1987 with Naglaa Fathi and Farouk al-Fishawy, Fakhfakhino in 2009, The Elephant on Handkerchief in 2011 with Talaat Zakaria, and The Fourth Pyramid in 2016. He announced his retirement in 2017. However, he later returned to acting, in which he had a role in Esh Al-Dababir, which was filmed in Beirut in early 2021.

== Personal life ==
He was married four times, in which he had one son and two daughters. He first married an actress, Laila Taher, for four years. Then he married Nadia Chirine, daughter of Fawzia of Egypt, with whom he had a daughter, Sinai. He later married another actress, Seham Fathi. In 1989, he married a Kuwaiti, Iman Shreaan, with whom he had another daughter, Zainab, and a son, Murad.

== Death ==
In February 2021, he contracted COVID-19 during the COVID-19 pandemic in Egypt, and was admitted to Dokki Hospital, then transported to Al-Agouza Hospital in Giza. On 28 February, he died from complications related to COVID-19. He was buried at the 6th of October cemetery.
