= Malatily Bathhouse =

1973 Egyptian LGBT film by Salah Abu Seif

Malaṯily Bathhouse
- Theatrical release poster
- Directed by: Salah Abu Seif
- Written by: Ismail Walieddin
- Produced by: Salah Abu Seif
- Starring: Shams al-Baroudi; Yusuf Shåban
- Music by: Gamal Salama
- Release date: June 2, 1973
- Country: Egypt
- Language: Egyptian Arabic

Malaṯily Bathhouse (Arabic: حمام الملاطيلي "Ĥamam al-Malaṯily") is a 1973 Egyptian film directed by Salah Abu Seif. It stars Shams al-Baroudi and Yusuf Shåban. The film is adapted from a novel by Ismåeel Walieddin. Samar Habib, author of Female Homosexuality in the Middle East: Histories and Representations, said "that the title of the film can "be easily translated" as Malatily Bathhouse." The opening credits of the film have the English title An Egyptian Tragedy. Habib said that it was "strangely translated" into An Egyptian Tragedy.

== Plot ==
The beginning shows what Habib calls a "long scenic tribute" to Cairo and to the general city. Habib said that the director "visually implies the polymorphous vagaries of the city in which an immoral underworld is bound to flourish.

The main character, Aĥmad, leaves rural eastern Egypt for the city hoping to become economically self-sufficient, get an apartment for his parents, and obtain a law degree. He and his family are refugees from a town occupied by the Israeli army, Ismaåilia. Ali, the owner of the Malatily Bathhouse, offers to let him stay there for free. Aĥmad encounters several characters there, including Naåeema, a prostitute who he becomes obsessed with, and Raouf, a male homosexual. Ali later has Aĥmad work as his accountant. Aĥmad eventually has sexual intercourse with Naåeema. Aĥmad finds a lack of employment opportunities and becomes associated with the bathhouse, so his original goals are not met.

Habib said "There appears to be a sensitive awareness that foreign viewers of the film should not regard its content as conspiring with or approving of the morally loose behaviour of the libertines it depicts." Habib argues that this seems to depict Egyptian society in a "state of disarray" likely to be occurring during the Suez Crisis.

== Cast and characters ==
- Shams al-Baroudi as 'Naåeema, a female prostitute, has her first romantic sexual relation with Ahmad. She comes from a poor background and prostitutes herself in order to support herself.
- Yusuf Shaban as Raouf Bey, is a male homosexual. Habib said that Raouf "subverts popular understanding of homosexuality by being unable to be brought back into the norm of heterosexual desires." Raouf makes advances towards Aĥmad, who initially cannot comprehend them. He is good friends with Åli. Habib wrote that Raouf is "an unsympathetic character" as he exploits men who do not willingly do homosexual acts but require him in order to make a living, and that Raouf's sexuality "initially appears" to be without emotion and only physical. Habib wrote that it appears Raouf wishes to prostitute Aĥmad but in fact he truly wants Aĥmad to be his boyfriend, and while citing the works of the historian Jabarti he laments that he cannot do what he wants in the modern society despite the freedom of the past.
- Mohamed El-Arabi as Aĥmad Taher, who was displaced with his family from Ismailia to Sharqia, during the War of Attrition, obtained his high school diploma, and went to Cairo with a letter of recommendation to join a job, and complete his studies by joining the Faculty of Law. His dream was to get an apartment, and to invite his family to live in Cairo.
- Fayez Halawa as Muålim Badawi, the owner of the bathhouse. He gives male prostitutes to Raouf. Police arrest him after Kamal commits murder.
- Naimat Mokhtar, wife of Muålim Badawi, the owner of the bathhouse
- Kamal, a male prostitute, is an employee of Åli. He murders a casino director who Habib implies is a "sugar daddy" and who is the new employer of Kamal. Habib wrote that the male prostitutes are "incidental to the main plot" and all originate from desperate, impoverished backgrounds.
- Samir is a male prostitute. Aĥmad tells him he should find a reliable job that has respectability, and Samir responds stating that he is poor and does not have the luxury of planning for the far future. Through Samir and Fatĥi, Ahmad learns that some people cannot go ahead in life through perseverance, self-education, and diligence, and that some people have to be prostitutes in order to survive.
- Fatĥi is another male prostitute. In a conversation with Aĥmad he tells him a concept similar to that given by Samir.
- Mohsin is an employee of the bathhouse.

== Reception ==
The film has been included in the 2006 Bibliotheca Alexandrina's 100 Greatest Egyptian Films.

== See also ==
- Cinema of Egypt
- All My Life
- Pleasure and Suffering
