= Bibliotheca Alexandrina's 100 Greatest Egyptian Films =

List of the best 100 Egyptian films

The Bibliotheca Alexandrina's 100 Greatest Egyptian Films is a list compiled in November 2006 by a committee formed by Bibliotheca Alexandrina, which includes Ahmed El Hadari as the committee head, with the membership of Samir Farid and Kamal Ramzi.

== List breakdown ==
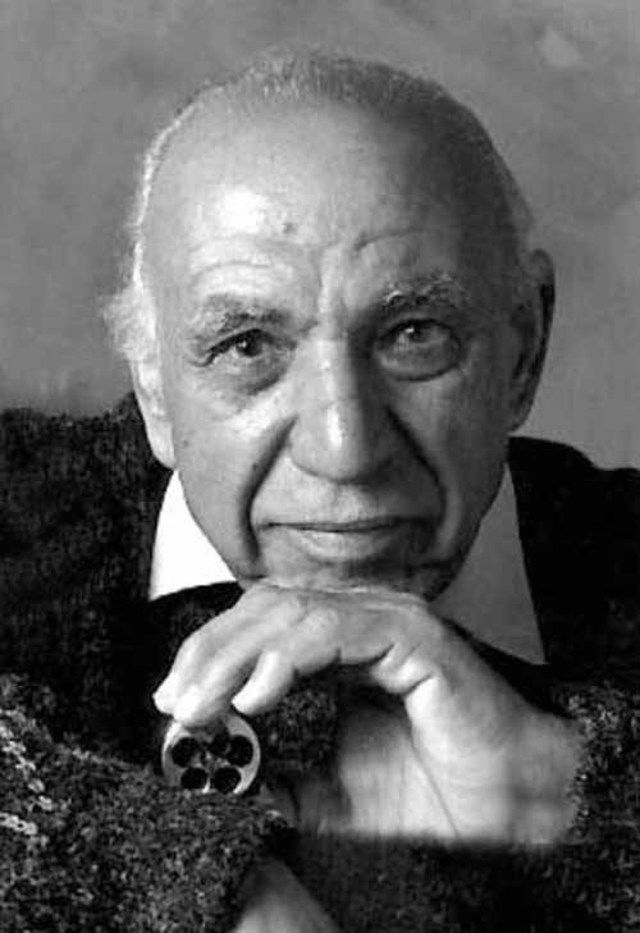
Salah Abu Seif

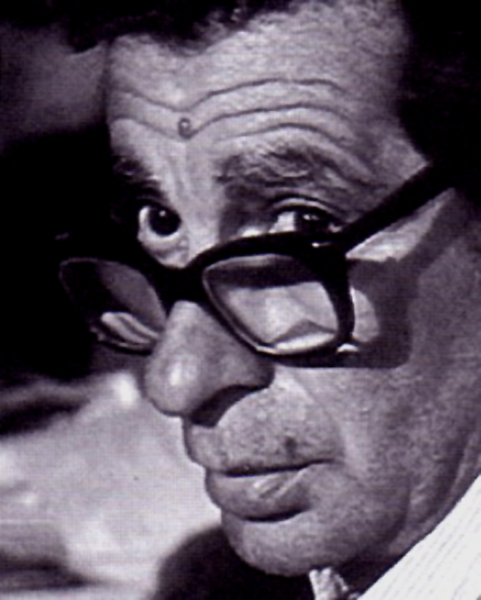
Youssef Chahine

- Salah Abu Seif with eight films, is the most represented director in the list; followed by Youssef Chahine, with seven films and Henry Barakat with four films.

== Excerpt from list ==
Title	Director	Year
The White Rose (Al-Warda Al-Bida)	Mohammed Karim	1933
Song of Hope (Nasheed Al Amal)	Ahmed Badrakhan	1937
Salama is Okay (Salama fi Kheir)	Niazi Mustafa	1937
Lasheen	Fritz Kramp	1938
Othman and Ali (Othman wi Ali)	Togo Mizrahi	1939
The Will (Al Azima)	Kamal Selim	1939
Love and Revenge (Gharam wa Intiqam)	Youssef Wahbi	1944
The Black Market (Al Souq Al Sawdaa)	Kamel El-Telmissani	1945
Antar and Abla (Antar wi Abla)	Niazi Mustafa	1945
Woman's Play (Li'bit Al-Sit)	Walieddin Sameh	1946

== See also ==
- Cinema of Egypt
