= List of Egyptian films of 1974 =

A list of films produced in Egypt in 1974. For an A-Z list of films currently on Wikipedia, see Category:Egyptian films.

Title	Director	Cast	Genre	Notes
Dunya (Donya)	Abdel Moneim Shokry	Salah Zulfikar, Nelly	Drama	
24 Saa'a Hob (24 Hours of Love)	Abdel Moneim Shokry	Hassan Yousef, Soheir Ramzy, Adel Emam, Samir Ghanem, Zizi El-Badrawy, Lebleba	Comedy / romance	
Abnaa El Samt (Children of Silence)	Mohamed Rady	Nour El-Sherif, Mervat Amin, Ahmad Zaki, Mahmoud Morsi, Madiha Kamel, Mohamed Sobhi, Hamdy Ahmed, Sayed Zayan, Elsayed Rady	Drama / Historical / war	
Al-Rida’ al-Abyad (The White Dress)	Hassan Ramzi	Naglaa Fathi, Ahmad Mazhar, Magdy Wahba, Yusuf Wahbi, Khaled Aanous, Hassan Afifi, Zahrat El-Ula, Layla Fahmy		
Fel Saif Lazem Nohib (In Summer, we must Love)	Mohamed Abdel Aziz	Salah Zulfikar, Abdel Moneim Madbouly, Nour El-Sherif, Samir Ghanem	Comedy	
Al-Mohem El-Hob (Love Is All That Matters)	Abdel Moneim Shokry	Adel Emam, Nahed Sherif, Samir Ghanem, Safa Abu Al-Saud, Emad Hamdy	Comedy / romance	
Al-Zawaj Al-Saeed (Happy Marriage)	Helmy Rafla	Hassan Yousef, Shams El-Barudy, Adel Emam, Safa Abu Al-Saud	Comedy / romance	
El Hafeed (The Grandson)		Taheya Kareoka, Emad Hamdi, Mervat Amin, Nour El Sharif		Conclusion of Om El Arroussa
Shayateen Lel-Abad (Devils Forever)	Mahmoud Farid	Adel Emam, Farouk Youssef, Safa Abu Al-Saud, Hayat Kandeel, Nagwa Fouad	Comedy / romance	
Shelet El-Moshaghbeen (Troublemakers Group)	Mohamed Salman	Adel Emam, Sabah, Madiha Kamel, Saeed Saleh, Ahmad Zaki, Younes Shalaby	Comedy / romance	
Agmal Ayam Hayaty		Samir Chamas	Drama	
