= List of films with an ensemble cast =

The following lists contain films that feature an ensemble cast presented in alphabetical order. Many have won the Satellite Award for Best Cast – Motion Picture or the Screen Actors Guild Award for Outstanding Performance by a Cast in a Motion Picture.

== Alphabetical list ==
- 10 Years (2011)
- 11:14 (2003)
- 12 Angry Men (1957)
- 1941 (1979)
- 300 (2007)
- The Adventures of Buckaroo Banzai Across the Eighth Dimension (1984)
- Alpha Dog (2006)
- American Pie (1999)
- American Pie 2 (2001)
- American Reunion (2012)
- American Wedding (2003)
- Airport (1970)
- Airport 1975 (1975)
- Airport '77 (1977)
- The Best of Everything (1959)
- The Concorde ... Airport '79 (1980)
- All Fall Down (1962)
- American Hustle (2013)
- The Angry Birds Movie (2016)
- Around the World in 80 Days (1956)
- Around the World in 80 Days (2004)
- Asteroid City (2023)
- Astro Boy (2009)
- August: Osage County (2013)
- Avatar (2009)
- Avatar: Fire and Ash (2025)
- Avatar: The Way of Water (2022)
- The Avengers (2012)
- Avengers: Age of Ultron (2015)
- Avengers: Doomsday (2026)
- Avengers: Endgame (2019)
- Avengers: Infinity War (2018)
- Babel (2006)
- Babylon (2022)
- The Bad Guys (2022)
- The Bad Guys 2 (2025)
- Bad Times at the El Royale (2018)
- Barbershop: The Next Cut (2016)
- The Battle at Lake Changjin (2021)
- The Battle at Lake Changjin II (2022)
- Battle of the Sexes (2017)
- Beauty and the Beast (1991)
- Beauty and the Beast (2017)
- The Beguiled (2017)
- Belly (1998)
- Berlin, I Love You (2019)
- Best in Show (2000)
- The Best Man (1999)
- The Best Man Holiday (2013)
- The Best Years of Our Lives (1946)
- Beyond the Poseidon Adventure (1979)
- The Big Bus (1976)
- The Big Chill (1983)
- Black Hawk Down (2001)
- The Black Hole (1979)
- Black Panther (2018)
- The Bling Ring (2013)
- Blue Collar (1978)
- Boogie Nights (1997)
- Boyz n the Hood (1991)
- Brother (2000)
- Brewster McCloud (1970)
- A Bridge Too Far (1977)
- Buffalo Bill and the Indians, or Sitting Bull's History Lesson (1976)
- Bullets Over Broadway (1994)
- Caddyshack (1980)
- California Suite (1978)
- The Cannonball Run (1981)
- Cannonball Run II (1984)
- Can't Hardly Wait (1998)
- Captain America: Civil War (2016)
- Car Wash (1976)
- Cars franchise
  - Cars (2006)
  - Cars 2 (2011)
  - Cars 3 (2017)
- Casino Royale (1967)
- Catch-22 (1970)
- Chantilly Lace (1993)
- Chariots of Fire (1981)
- Chicago (2002)
- The Class of Miss MacMichael (1978)
- Clerks (1994)
- Closer (2004)
- Clue (1985)
- Collateral Beauty (2016)
- Cradle Will Rock (1999)
- Crash (2004)
- Crazy Rich Asians (2018)
- Crazy, Stupid, Love (2011)
- Creation of the Gods I: Kingdom of Storms (2023)
- Dark Phoenix (2019)
- Dawn of the Planet of the Apes (2014)
- Death on the Nile (1978)
- Death on the Nile (2022)
- Definitely, Maybe (2008)
- The Departed (2006)
- Dick Tracy (1990)
- Digger (2026)
- Django Unchained (2012)
- Dolittle (2020)
- Don't Look Up (2021)
- Dune (2021)
- Dune: Part Two (2024)
- Dune: Part Three (2026)
- Dunkirk (2017)
- Earthquake (1974)
- Emperor of the North (1973)
- Eternals (2021)
- Everest (2015)
- Evil Under the Sun (1982)
- The Expendables franchise
- F1 (2025)
- F9 (2021)
- The Family Stone (2005)
- Fantastic Beasts and Where to Find Them (2016)
- The Fantastic Four: First Steps (2025)
- Fargo (1996)
- Fast Five (2011)
- Fast & Furious 6 (2013)
- Fast Times at Ridgemont High (1982)
- Fast X (2023)
- The Fate of the Furious (2017)
- For Your Consideration (2006)
- The French Dispatch (2021)
- From Here to Eternity (1953)
- Furious 7 (2015)
- G.I. Joe: The Rise of Cobra (2009)
- G.I. Joe: Retaliation (2013)
- Get On Up (2014)
- Glass Onion: A Knives Out Mystery (2022)
- Glengarry Glen Ross (1992)
- The Godfather trilogy
- The Good Girl (2002)
- The Goonies (1985)
- Gosford Park (2001)
- The Grand Budapest Hotel (2014)
- Grand Canyon (1991)
- Grand Hotel (1932)
- The Great Bank Hoax (1978)
- The Great Escape (1963)
- The Great Gatsby (2013)
- The Greatest Showman (2017)
- The Greatest Story Ever Told (1965)
- Guardians of the Galaxy (2014)
- Guardians of the Galaxy Vol. 2 (2017)
- Guardians of the Galaxy Vol. 3 (2023)
- The Guilty (1975)
- Hail, Caesar! (2016)
- Hairspray (1988)
- Hairspray (2007)
- Hannah and Her Sisters (1986)
- Harry Potter and the Deathly Hallows – Part 1 (2010)
- Harry Potter and the Deathly Hallows – Part 2 (2011)
- The Hateful Eight (2015)
- A Haunting in Venice (2022)
- Health (1980)
- Heat (1995)
- The Help (2011)
- Hemet, or the Landlady Don't Drink Tea (2023)
- He's Just Not That Into You (2009)
- Hidden Figures (2016)
- The Hindenburg (1975)
- Hit the Deck (1955)
- Hotel Transylvania 3: Summer Vacation (2018)
- How The West Was Won (1962)
- How to Train Your Dragon 2 (2027)
- The Hunger Games (2012)
- The Hunger Games: Catching Fire (2013)
- The Hunger Games: Sunrise on the Reaping (2026)
- Hustle & Flow (2005)
- The Ice Storm (1997)
- IF (2024)
- If Beale Street Could Talk (2018)
- Inception (2010)
- Independence Day (1996)
- Independence Day: Resurgence (2016)
- Inside Man (2006)
- Inglourious Basterds (2009)
- Interiors (1978)
- Interstellar (2014)
- Into the Woods (2014)
- Intolerance (1916)
- In the Heights (2021)
- It's a Mad, Mad, Mad, Mad World (1963)
- John Wick: Chapter 3 – Parabellum (2019)
- John Wick: Chapter 4 (2023)
- Judgment at Nuremberg (1961)
- Jurassic Park (1993)
- Jurassic World: Dominion (2022)
- Justice League (2017)
- King Kong (2005)
- The King's Speech (2010)
- Knives Out (2019)
- Kung Fu Panda (2008)
- Kung Fu Panda 2 (2011)
- Kung Fu Panda 3 (2016)
- L.A. Confidential (1997)
- The Last Picture Show (1971)
- A League of Their Own (1992)
- The Lego Batman Movie (2017)
- The Lego Movie (2014)
- The Lego Movie 2: The Second Part (2019)
- Les Misérables (2012)
- Licorice Pizza (2021)
- The Life Aquatic with Steve Zissou (2004)
- The Lion King (1994)
- The Lion King (2019)
- Little Miss Sunshine (2006)
- Little Women (1933)
- Little Women (1949)
- Little Women (1994)
- Little Women (2019)
- Lock, Stock and Two Smoking Barrels (1998)
- Logan Lucky (2017)
- The Longest Day (1962)
- The Lord of the Rings franchise
  - The Lord of the Rings: The Fellowship of the Ring (2001)
  - The Lord of the Rings: The Return of the King (2003)
  - The Lord of the Rings: The Two Towers (2002)
  - The Hobbit: An Unexpected Journey (2012)
  - The Hobbit: The Battle of the Five Armies (2014)
  - The Hobbit: The Desolation of Smaug (2013)
- Love Actually (2003)
- Lovelife (1997)
- Madagascar: Escape 2 Africa (2008)
- Magnolia (1999)
- Mamma Mia! (2008)
- Mamma Mia! Here We Go Again (2018)
- Marie Antoinette (2006)
- Mars Attacks! (1996)
- Maze Runner: The Death Cure (2018)
- Ma Rainey's Black Bottom (2020)
- Megalopolis (2024)
- Meet the Robinsons (2007)
- Midnight in Paris (2011)
- Midnight Madness (1980)
- A Mighty Wind (2003)
- Million Dollar Mystery (1987)
- A Million Ways to Die in the West (2014)
- Mission: Impossible – Dead Reckoning Part One (2023)
- Mission: Impossible – Fallout (2018)
- Mission: Impossible – The Final Reckoning (2025)
- Mother's Day (2016)
- The Monuments Men (2014)
- Moonrise Kingdom (2012)
- Moulin Rouge! (2001)
- Murder by Death (1976)
- Murder on the Orient Express (1974)
- Murder on the Orient Express (2017)
- Nashville (1975)
- Network (1976)
- New Year's Eve (2011)
- No Down Payment (1957)
- Noises Off (1992)
- The North Avenue Irregulars (1979)
- Now You See Me (2013)
- Now You See Me 2 (2016)
- Now You See Me: Now You Don't (2025)
- Ocean's Eight (2018)
- Ocean's Eleven (2001)
- Ocean's Thirteen (2007)
- Ocean's Twelve (2004)
- The Odyssey (2026)
- Oh! What a Lovely War (1969)
- On the Town (1949)
- Once Upon a Time in Hollywood (2019)
- One Battle After Another (2025)
- Oppenheimer (2023)
- The Other Man (1973)
- Pacific Rim (2013)
- Pacific Rim Uprising (2018)
- Paw Patrol: The Dino Movie (2026)
- Paw Patrol: The Mighty Movie (2023)
- Pirates of the Caribbean: At World's End (2007)
- Pirates of the Caribbean: Dead Man's Chest (2006)
- Pitch Perfect (2012)
- Pitch Perfect 2 (2015)
- Pitch Perfect 3 (2017)
- PK (2014)
- Planet of the Apes (2001)
- The Player (1992)
- Popeye (1980)
- The Poseidon Adventure (1972)
- Prêt-à-Porter (1994)
- Prisoners (2013)
- Pulp Fiction (1994)
- Rango (2011)
- Rat Race (2001)
- Ready Player One (2018)
- Reds (1981)
- Rise of the Planet of the Apes (2011)
- The Rocky Horror Picture Show (1975)
- Rogue One (2016)
- A Room with a View (1986)
- The Royal Tenenbaums (2001)
- Saturday Night (2024)
- Scary Movie (2000)
- Scavenger Hunt (1979)
- Scott Pilgrim vs. the World (2010)
- Secrets & Lies (1996)
- See How They Run (2022)
- September (1987)
- Seven Psychopaths (2012)
- Seven Samurai (1954)
- Sgt. Pepper's Lonely Hearts Club Band (1978)
- Shakespeare in Love (1998)
- Shrek 2 (2004)
- Ship of Fools (1965)
- Shock Treatment (1981)
- Short Cuts (1993)
- Silver City (2004)
- Skyfall (2012)
- Snatch (2000)
- Soapdish (1991)
- The Social Network (2010)
- Soul Food (1997)
- Spaceballs (1987)
- Spider-Man 3 (2007)
- Spider-Man: Across the Spider-Verse (2023)
- Spider-Man: Beyond the Spider-Verse (2027)
- Spider-Man: No Way Home (2021)
- Spotlight (2015)
- Star Wars franchise
  - Star Wars: Episode I – The Phantom Menace (1999)
  - Star Wars: Episode II – Attack of the Clones (2002)
  - Star Wars: Episode III – Revenge of the Sith (2005)
  - Star Wars: Episode IV – A New Hope (1977)
  - Star Wars: Episode V – The Empire Strikes Back (1980)
  - Star Wars: Episode VI – Return of the Jedi (1983)
  - Star Wars: Episode VII – The Force Awakens (2015)
  - Star Wars: Episode VIII – The Last Jedi (2017)
  - Star Wars: Episode IX – The Rise of Skywalker (2019)
- Stardust (2007)
- State and Main (2000)
- Steel Magnolias (1989)
- Straight Outta Compton (2015)
- Strangers in Good Company (1992)
- Street Fighter (2026)
- Suicide Squad (2016)
- Superman (1978)
- Superman (2025)
- The Super Mario Bros. Movie (2023)
- The Super Mario Galaxy Movie (2026)
- The Swarm (1978)
- Syriana (2005)
- Tales from the Crypt (1972)
- Teenage Mutant Ninja Turtles: Mutant Mayhem (2023)
- That Christmas (2024)
- The Thin Red Line (1998)
- The Thing (1982)
- The Twilight Saga: Breaking Dawn – Part 2 (2012)
- This Is the End (2013)
- Those Magnificent Men in their Flying Machines (1965)
- Three Coins in the Fountain (1954)
- Thunderbolts* (2025)
- Tinker Tailor Soldier Spy (2011)
- Titanic (1997)
- Top Gun: Maverick (2022)
- Tora! Tora! Tora! (1970)
- Tower Heist (2011)
- The Towering Inferno (1974)
- The Town (2010)
- Toy Story 3 (2010)
- Toy Story 4 (2019)
- Toy Story 5 (2026)
- Traffic (2000)
- Transformers (2007)
- Transformers: Dark of the Moon (2011)
- Transformers: The Last Knight (2017)
- Transformers: Revenge of the Fallen (2009)
- The Trial of the Chicago 7 (2020)
- Tropic Thunder (2008)
- Troy (2004)
- True Romance (1993)
- Twister (1996)
- Twisters (2024)
- Unfrosted (2024)
- Valentine's Day (2010)
- The Volunteers: To the War (2023)
- Voyage of the Damned (1976)
- Waiting for Guffman (1997)
- War for the Planet of the Apes (2017)
- Warfare (2025)
- Weapons (2025)
- A Wedding (1978)
- Wet Hot American Summer (2001)
- The Whales of August (1987)
- Who Framed Roger Rabbit (1988)
- The Wolf of Wall Street (2013)
- Woman's World (1954)
- X-Men (2000)
- X-Men: Apocalypse (2016)
- X-Men: Days of Future Past (2014)
- X-Men: First Class (2011)
- X-Men: The Last Stand (2006)
- X2 (2003)
- Zootopia (2016)
- Zootopia 2 (2025)

== Chronological list ==
| Year | Title |
|---|---|
| 1916 | Intolerance |
| 1932 | Grand Hotel |
| 1933 | Little Women |
| 1949 | Little Women |
| 1949 | On the Town |
| 1953 | From Here to Eternity |
| 1954 | Three Coins in the Fountain |
| 1954 | Woman's World |
| 1954 | Seven Samurai |
| 1955 | Hit the Deck |
| 1956 | Around the World in 80 Days |
| 1957 | 12 Angry Men |
| 1959 | The Best of Everything |
| 1961 | Judgment at Nuremberg |
| 1962 | All Fall Down |
| 1962 | The Longest Day |
| 1962 | How The West Was Won |
| 1963 | It's a Mad, Mad, Mad, Mad World |
| 1963 | The Great Escape |
| 1965 | The Greatest Story Ever Told |
| 1965 | Those Magnificent Men in their Flying Machines |
| 1965 | Ship of Fools |
| 1967 | Casino Royale |
| 1969 | Oh! What a Lovely War |
| 1970 | Airport |
| 1970 | Brewster McCloud |
| 1970 | Catch-22 |
| 1970 | Tora! Tora! Tora! |
| 1971 | The Last Picture Show |
| 1972 | Tales from the Crypt |
| 1972 | The Poseidon Adventure |
| 1972 | The Godfather |
| 1973 | Emperor of the North |
| 1973 | The Other Man |
| 1974 | Earthquake |
| 1974 | The Godfather Part II |
| 1974 | Murder on the Orient Express |
| 1974 | The Towering Inferno |
| 1975 | The Guilty |
| 1975 | The Hindenburg |
| 1975 | The Rocky Horror Picture Show |
| 1975 | Nashville |
| 1975 | Airport 1975 |
| 1976 | Network |
| 1976 | Voyage of the Damned |
| 1976 | Murder by Death |
| 1976 | Car Wash |
| 1976 | Buffalo Bill and the Indians, or Sitting Bull's History Lesson |
| 1976 | The Big Bus |
| 1977 | A Bridge Too Far |
| 1977 | Star Wars: Episode IV – A New Hope |
| 1977 | Airport '77 |
| 1978 | California Suite |
| 1978 | The Class of Miss MacMichael |
| 1978 | The Great Bank Hoax |
| 1978 | Death on the Nile |
| 1978 | A Wedding |
| 1978 | Superman |
| 1978 | The Swarm |
| 1978 | Interiors |
| 1978 | Sgt. Pepper's Lonely Hearts Club Band |
| 1979 | 1941 |
| 1979 | Scavenger Hunt |
| 1979 | The North Avenue Irregulars |
| 1979 | The Black Hole |
| 1979 | Beyond the Poseidon Adventure |
| 1980 | The Concorde ... Airport '79 |
| 1980 | Caddyshack |
| 1980 | Health |
| 1980 | Star Wars: Episode V – The Empire Strikes Back |
| 1980 | Midnight Madness |
| 1980 | Popeye |
| 1981 | The Cannonball Run |
| 1981 | Chariots of Fire |
| 1981 | Reds |
| 1981 | Shock Treatment |
| 1982 | The Thing |
| 1982 | Fast Times at Ridgemont High |
| 1982 | Evil Under the Sun |
| 1983 | Star Wars: Episode VI – Return of the Jedi |
| 1983 | The Big Chill |
| 1984 | The Adventures of Buckaroo Banzai Across the Eighth Dimension |
| 1984 | Cannonball Run II |
| 1985 | Clue |
| 1985 | The Goonies |
| 1986 | Hannah and Her Sisters |
| 1986 | A Room with a View |
| 1987 | September |
| 1987 | Spaceballs |
| 1987 | Million Dollar Mystery |
| 1987 | The Whales of August |
| 1988 | Hairspray |
| 1989 | Steel Magnolias |
| 1990 | Dick Tracy |
| 1990 | The Godfather Part III |
| 1991 | Grand Canyon |
| 1991 | Soapdish |
| 1991 | Beauty and the Beast |
| 1991 | Boyz n the Hood |
| 1992 | The Player |
| 1992 | Noises Off |
| 1992 | A League of Their Own |
| 1992 | Strangers in Good Company |
| 1992 | Glengarry Glen Ross |
| 1993 | Short Cuts |
| 1993 | True Romance |
| 1993 | Jurassic Park |
| 1993 | Chantilly Lace |
| 1994 | Bullets Over Broadway |
| 1994 | Clerks |
| 1994 | Little Women |
| 1994 | Prêt-à-Porter |
| 1994 | Pulp Fiction |
| 1995 | Heat |
| 1996 | Fargo |
| 1996 | Independence Day |
| 1996 | Secrets & Lies |
| 1996 | Mars Attacks! |
| 1997 | Boogie Nights |
| 1997 | Soul Food |
| 1997 | Waiting for Guffman |
| 1997 | Titanic |
| 1997 | Lovelife |
| 1997 | L.A. Confidential |
| 1997 | The Ice Storm |
| 1998 | Shakespeare in Love |
| 1998 | Lock, Stock and Two Smoking Barrels |
| 1998 | Can't Hardly Wait |
| 1999 | Cradle Will Rock |
| 1999 | Star Wars: Episode I – The Phantom Menace |
| 1999 | Magnolia |
| 1999 | The Best Man |
| 1999 | American Pie |
| 2000 | Best in Show |
| 2000 | State and Main |
| 2000 | Traffic |
| 2000 | Snatch |
| 2000 | X-Men |
| 2001 | American Pie 2 |
| 2001 | Black Hawk Down |
| 2001 | Wet Hot American Summer |
| 2001 | Ocean's Eleven |
| 2001 | Gosford Park |
| 2001 | Moulin Rouge! |
| 2001 | Rat Race |
| 2001 | The Royal Tenenbaums |
| 2001 | The Lord of the Rings: The Fellowship of the Ring |
| 2002 | Star Wars: Episode II – Attack of the Clones (2002) |
| 2002 | The Lord of the Rings: The Two Towers |
| 2002 | The Good Girl |
| 2002 | Chicago |
| 2003 | 11:14 |
| 2003 | American Wedding |
| 2003 | The Lord of the Rings: The Return of the King |
| 2003 | X2 |
| 2003 | A Mighty Wind |
| 2003 | Love Actually |
| 2004 | Around the World in 80 Days |
| 2004 | Closer |
| 2004 | Crash |
| 2004 | Ocean's Twelve |
| 2004 | The Life Aquatic with Steve Zissou |
| 2004 | Silver City |
| 2005 | The Family Stone |
| 2005 | Star Wars: Episode III – Revenge of the Sith |
| 2005 | Syriana |
| 2005 | Hustle & Flow |
| 2006 | Alpha Dog |
| 2006 | Little Miss Sunshine |
| 2006 | X-Men: The Last Stand |
| 2006 | Babel |
| 2006 | Marie Antoinette |
| 2006 | For Your Consideration |
| 2006 | The Departed |
| 2007 | Stardust |
| 2007 | Ocean's Thirteen |
| 2007 | Hairspray |
| 2008 | Tropic Thunder |
| 2008 | Mamma Mia! |
| 2008 | Definitely, Maybe |
| 2009 | Astro Boy |
| 2009 | He's Just Not That Into You |
| 2010 | Harry Potter and the Deathly Hallows – Part 1 |
| 2010 | The Expendables |
| 2010 | Inception |
| 2010 | The King's Speech |
| 2010 | Scott Pilgrim vs. the World |
| 2010 | The Social Network |
| 2010 | Valentine's Day |
| 2010 | The Town |
| 2011 | Tower Heist |
| 2011 | X-Men: First Class |
| 2011 | Tinker Tailor Soldier Spy |
| 2011 | Harry Potter and the Deathly Hallows – Part 2 |
| 2011 | The Help |
| 2011 | Crazy, Stupid, Love |
| 2011 | Bridesmaids |
| 2011 | New Year's Eve |
| 2011 | 10 Years |
| 2012 | The Hobbit: An Unexpected Journey |
| 2012 | The Expendables 2 |
| 2012 | Seven Psychopaths |
| 2012 | Les Misérables |
| 2012 | Pitch Perfect |
| 2012 | Moonrise Kingdom |
| 2012 | American Reunion |
| 2012 | The Avengers |
| 2013 | American Hustle |
| 2013 | August: Osage County |
| 2013 | The Hobbit: The Desolation of Smaug |
| 2013 | Now You See Me |
| 2013 | The Best Man Holiday |
| 2013 | The Bling Ring |
| 2013 | The Great Gatsby |
| 2013 | This Is the End |
| 2013 | Prisoners |
| 2013 | The Wolf of Wall Street |
| 2014 | X-Men: Days of Future Past |
| 2014 | A Million Ways to Die in the West |
| 2014 | The Lego Movie |
| 2014 | Into the Woods |
| 2014 | The Grand Budapest Hotel |
| 2014 | Guardians of the Galaxy |
| 2014 | The Expendables 3 |
| 2014 | Get On Up |
| 2014 | The Monuments Men |
| 2014 | The Hobbit: The Battle of the Five Armies |
| 2015 | Avengers: Age of Ultron |
| 2015 | The Hateful Eight |
| 2015 | Spotlight |
| 2015 | Pitch Perfect 2 |
| 2015 | Star Wars: Episode VII – The Force Awakens |
| 2016 | Barbershop: The Next Cut |
| 2016 | Independence Day: Resurgence |
| 2016 | Hidden Figures |
| 2016 | Mother's Day |
| 2016 | X-Men: Apocalypse |
| 2016 | Suicide Squad |
| 2016 | Hail, Caesar! |
| 2016 | Fantastic Beasts and Where to Find Them |
| 2016 | Captain America: Civil War |
| 2016 | Collateral Beauty |
| 2016 | Now You See Me 2 |
| 2017 | Logan Lucky |
| 2017 | Guardians of the Galaxy Vol. 2 |
| 2017 | Dunkirk |
| 2017 | Pitch Perfect 3 |
| 2017 | Star Wars: Episode VIII – The Last Jedi |
| 2017 | Justice League |
| 2017 | Battle of the Sexes |
| 2017 | Beauty and the Beast |
| 2017 | The Beguiled |
| 2017 | Murder on the Orient Express |
| 2018 | Bad Times at the El Royale |
| 2018 | Black Panther |
| 2018 | Crazy Rich Asians |
| 2018 | Mamma Mia! Here We Go Again |
| 2018 | Ocean's Eight |
| 2018 | If Beale Street Could Talk |
| 2018 | Avengers: Infinity War |
| 2019 | Avengers: Endgame |
| 2019 | Dark Phoenix |
| 2019 | Knives Out |
| 2019 | The Lego Movie 2: The Second Part |
| 2019 | Star Wars: Episode IX – The Rise of Skywalker |
| 2019 | Once Upon a Time in Hollywood |
| 2019 | Berlin, I Love You |
| 2019 | Little Women |
| 2020 | Ma Rainey's Black Bottom |
| 2020 | The Trial of the Chicago 7 |
| 2021 | Licorice Pizza |
| 2021 | In the Heights |
| 2021 | Don't Look Up |
| 2021 | The French Dispatch |
| 2021 | Dune |
| 2021 | Eternals |
| 2021 | The Battle at Lake Changjin |
| 2022 | The Battle at Lake Changjin II |
| 2022 | Babylon |
| 2022 | Death on the Nile |
| 2022 | Jurassic World: Dominion |
| 2022 | A Haunting in Venice |
| 2022 | Glass Onion: A Knives Out Mystery |
| 2022 | See How They Run |
| 2023 | Barbie |
| 2023 | Creation of the Gods I: Kingdom of Storms |
| 2023 | The Volunteers: To the War |
| 2023 | Teenage Mutant Ninja Turtles: Mutant Mayhem |
| 2023 | Oppenheimer |
| 2023 | The Super Mario Bros. Movie |
| 2023 | Hemet, or the Landlady Don't Drink Tea |
| 2023 | Guardians of the Galaxy Vol. 3 |
| 2023 | Expend4bles |
| 2023 | Asteroid City |
| 2024 | IF |
| 2024 | Dune: Part Two |
| 2024 | Unfrosted |
| 2024 | That Christmas |
| 2024 | Megalopolis |
| 2025 | Warfare |
| 2025 | Thunderbolts* |
| 2025 | Now You See Me: Now You Don't |
| 2025 | Wake Up Dead Man |
| 2026 | The Super Mario Galaxy Movie |
| 2026 | The Odyssey |
| 2026 | Avengers: Doomsday |

== See also ==
- Ensemble cast
- All-star cast
- Screen Actors Guild Award for Outstanding Performance by a Cast in a Motion Picture
- Satellite Award for Best Cast – Motion Picture
