= List of Egyptian films of 1975 =

A list of films produced in Egypt in 1975. For an A-Z list of films currently on Wikipedia, see Category:Egyptian films.

| Title | Director | Cast | Genre | Notes |
|---|---|---|---|---|
| Al Mothneboon (The Guilty) | Said Marzouk | Salah Zulfikar, Hussein Fahmy, Soheir Ramzi, Kamal El-Shennawi, Zubaida Tharwat | Drama | |
| Al-Bahth An Al-Mataeb (Looking for Troubles) | Mahmoud Farid | Adel Emam, Safa Abu Al-Saud, Nahed Sherif, Mahmoud el-Meliguy | Comedy | |
| Al-Khedaa Al-Khafiya (The Hidden Trick) | Yehia El Alami | Farid Shawki, Adel Emam, Nahed Sherif, Nagwa Fouad | Mystery / thriller | |
| Ala Mn Notlik Al-Rosas? (Whom Should We Shoot?) | Kamal El Sheikh | Soad Hosny, Mahmoud Yassin, Ezzat El Alaili | Drama | |
| Al-Karnak (Karnak) | Ali Badrakhan | Soad Hosny, Nour El-Sherif, Farid Shawqi, Kamal El-Shennawi | | |
| Alo, ana al-ghetta (Hello, I'm the Cat) | Manoochehr Nozari | Nour El-Sherif, Poussi, Adel Emam, Mahmoud el-Meliguy | Comedy / fantasy | |
| El-Kol Awez Yeheb (Everybody Want to Fall in Love) | Ahmad Fouad | Adel Emam, Nour El-Sherif, Soheir Ramzi | Comedy | |
| Mouled Ya Donia (All the World's a Carnival) | Hessien Kamal | Mahmoud Yassin, Afaf Radi, Abdel Moneim Madbouli | Comedy | |
| Orid hallan (I want a solution) | Said Marzouk | Faten Hamama, Rushdy Abaza, Amina Rizk | Drama | |
| Sabreen | Hossam Eddine Mostafa | Naglaa Fathi, Nour El-Sherif, Adel Emam, Youssef Chaban, Emad Hamdy | Drama | |
