= The Criminal (1978 film) =

- المجرم
- Directed by: Salah Abu Seif; Ismail Hassan (assistant director)
- Starring: Shams al-Baroudi; Hassan Youssef; Amina Rizk; Mohamed Awad; Hamdy Ahmed; Soheir El-Barouni; Gamal Ismail
- Cinematography: Mahmoud Nasr
- Music by: Gamal Salama
- Release date: September 3, 1978
- Country: Egypt
- Language: Arabic

The Criminal (Arabic: المجرم transliterated as Shasha’a) is an Egyptian film released on September 3, 1978. The film is directed by Salah Abu Seif and based on the novel Thérèse Raquin by Émile Zola. It is the second adaptation by Abu Seif of this work he first adapted as Your Day Will Come, released in 1951.

== Synopsis ==
The idiot Zaghloul (Mohamed Awad) marries his cousin Insaf (Shams al-Baroudi), and they live with his mother (Amina Rizk), the owner of the public bath. Zaghloul's colleague Mounir (Hassan Youssef), a gambler, comes to seize the family fortune to feed his habit and sets up Zaghloul to drown, claiming falsely not to know how to swim to save him. Then Mounir asks for Insaf's hand in marriage and receives it reluctantly. The truth about Mounir's misdeeds comes to light, and he abuses Insaf. Hassouna (Hamdy Ahmed), a neighbor, becomes suspicious of him and comes to learn of the unsavory qualities, including his lie about being unable to swim.
