= Pleasure and Suffering =

- Arabic: المتعة والعذاب
- Directed by: Niazi Mostafa
- Written by: Niazi Mostafa
- Screenplay by: Faisal Nada
- Produced by: Abbas Helmi
- Starring: Shams al-Baroudi; Nour al-Sherif
- Cinematography: Mahmoud Nasr
- Edited by: Galal Mostafa
- Production company: Union Films (Abbas Helmi)
- Distributed by: Al Salam Films (Hassan Amin Imam & Partners)
- Release date: November 15, 1971 (Egypt)
- Running time: 101 minutes
- Country: Egypt
- Language: Egyptian Arabic

Pleasure and Suffering (Arabic: المتعة والعذاب, romanized: Al-Mutʿah wa-l-ʿAdhāb) is a 1971 Egyptian film written and directed by Niazi Mostafa. The film stars Shams al-Baroudi and Nour al-Sherif.

== Plot ==
The main characters are a group of four friends. Nana, a fashion designer, is the leader of the group. Nana has a fear of men, and she expresses anguish when her girlfriend Salwa says that her father is arranging a marriage for Salwa to one of her father's coworkers. Samar Habib, author of Female Homosexuality in the Middle East: Histories and Representations, describes Nana as an "ice-queen". Elham compulsively steals. She receives sexual pleasure from stealing. The fourth friend is Fifi. Another character is Âdel, a male character who is later revealed in the film as a con-man. Âdel expresses an interest in Nana, but Fifi tells Âdel that "she does not like men, she has a complex." Ultimately Âdel and Nana fall in love.

Habib said "The representation of female sexuality in this film thus tends towards the popular understanding that homosexual inclination in women is born out of trauma or a hatred for men, which can be corrected if the right man comes along." Habib argues that the film portrays female homosexuality as something that is transient.

== Cast ==
- Shams al-Baroudi as Nana
- Nour al-Sherif as Adel
- Safa' Abu Sâoud as Fifi
- Soheir Ramzi as Elham
- Rawya Ashour as Salwa
- Samir Sabri as Sabri
- Ghasaan Matar as Atwa
- Mohamed Hamdi as Esmat
- Mahmud Rashad as Branch manager
- Sayid Abdallah as Abdel Azim
- Mnwar Madkur
- Kamal elziyni
- Amina elshariei
- Nawal Hashim

== See also ==
- Cinema of Egypt
- All My Life
- A Girl Named Maĥmood
- Malatily Bathhouse
