= The Last-Born =

1966 film by Zoheir Bakir

- آخر العنقود
- Directed by: Zoheir Bakir
- Written by: Zoheir Bakir
- Starring: Hassan Youssef; Salah Kabil; Abdel Moneim Ibrahim; Shams al-Baroudi; Soheir Zaki; Lebleba; Tewfik el-Dekn; Zein el-Ashmawy; Taheyya Kariokka
- Production company: Omayya Films
- Distributed by: Ahmed Darwish Films
- Release date: April 20, 1966
- Running time: 90 minutes
- Country: Egypt
- Language: Arabic

The Last-Born (Arabic: آخر العنقود, romanized: Akher el ankud) is an Egyptian film released on April 20, 1966. The film is directed and written by Zoheir Bakir and stars Hassan Youssef, Shams al-Baroudi, Salah Kabil, and Taheyya Kariokka. It tells the story of a man named Muhammad, who pretends to die after joking and quarrelling with his friend Saad. Saad thinks that he killed his friend and runs away, eventually encountering a gang trying to recruit him.

== Cast and crew ==
- Hassan Youssef as Saad bin Saeed al-Saadawi
- Salah Kabil as Muhammad
- Shams al-Baroudi as Souad
- Taheyya Kariokka as Tawheeda Sost, a student
- Abdel Moneim Ibrahim as Moneim Mashaweer
- Lebleba as Sabah
- Zein el-Ashmawy as Moawad
- Tewfik el-Dekn as Tewfiq Eshaq
- Mohamed Shawky as Moselhi al-Qahwaji
- Mohamed Ahmed al-Masry as a mad scientist
- Soheir Zaki
- Suheir Sabri
- Farida Mahmoud
- Saeed Ashour
- Refaat Habib
- Fikri Ali
- Afaf Badr
- Anis Taher
- Khairy Faraq
- Wafaa Sharif
- Ragia Ibrahim
- El-Toukhy Tawfiq
- Sharif Zuhair

== Synopsis ==
Young Saad bin Saeed (Hassan Youssef) lives with his mother, who pampers him, and therefore is a weak young man who cannot defend himself. Therefore, he relies on his cousin Muhammad (Salah Kabil) to defend him. Saad's mother engages him to the daughter of his cousin Sunni (Suheir Sabri) against her wishes to marry Muhammad, who provokes Saad in an effort to goad him into standing up for himself until Saad grabs a vase and threatens Muhammad. The vase falls from Saad's hands and injures Muhammad, leading Saad to flee on the run from anticipated murder charges. Saad ends up in the house of a mad scientist who wants to drug and operate on the unexpected guest then send him to space in a new outfit, apparently one filled with money. Mouawad (Zein el-Ashmawy), a trucker, encounters the newly loaded man and takes him to the city to spend an evening at a nightclub, where Saad meets the leader of the Al-Alam wedding troupe, Tawheeda Sost (Taheyya Kariokka), her daughters Souad (Shams al-Baroudi) and Sabah (Lebleba), manager Moneim Mashaweer (Abdel Moneim Ibrahim), and the mob-affiliated club owner Tewfiq Eshaq (Tewfik el-Dekn).

Tewfiq has a scam where he promises work to people fresh from the hinterlands only to trick them into trying to murder each other with written confessions, which he then keeps on file as blackmail in exchange for his help hiding the body. He plies Saad with alcohol, whereupon Souad takes his money and Saad is forced to join the wedding band.

Saad and Moneim Mashaweer flee to work elsewhere, and the employer demands a Certificate of Military Service. Boot camp proves to reform both men, and Saad in particular becomes much bolder, earning them a transfer to the elite Fedayeen squad. Saad discovers that the trainer is his cousin Muhammad. Muhammad brings Saad back home and they go to the gang den to rescue Souad and Sabah and report Tawheeda, Mouawad, and Tewfiq to the police.

== Production ==
In an article published by Asharq Al-Awsat entitled “حسن يوسف يفتح خزائن أسراره” (“Hassan Youssef Opens Up His Cabinet of Secrets”), he tells the following of his first encounter with Shams al-Baroudi while shooting this movie in 1966:

We first met while shooting The Last-Born when Shams was in high school, and I remember her coming very late for a shoot and us having quite an argument, culminating in my asking her why at her house she would disrupt the film I was starring in. She replied that “you are the star, not the director or producer, and you do not have the right to ask me and know that I will not finish this,” proceeding to hang up.

Lebleba was married to Youssef at the time of filming, but they divorced in 1972, whence he married Al-Baroudi. Lebleba had threatened her family that she would kill herself if they did not let her marry him, according to the site El-Fann:

At the end of the 1960’s, Youssef fell in love with the then 17-year-old Lebleba and proposed to her. Allegedly his infatuation was based on her devotion to her mother, the care of whom the young actress often put above work obligations, though she told him her mother still saw her as too young. Lebleba threatened suicide and began to pack her clothes, coercing her mother into relenting. The ceremony was attended by many prominent actors, including Shadia and Farid Shawqi, and the marriage would last seven years.

It was reported in the magazine Layalina that the late singer Abdel Halim Hafez attended the wedding, as seen in pictures of the couple with him.
