= There is a Man in our House =

There is a Man in Our House
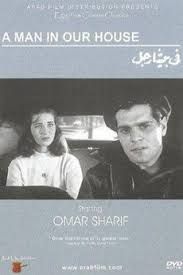
- DVD Poster
- Directed by: Henry Barakat
- Screenplay by: Yussef Issa
- Story by: Ihsan Abdel Quddous
- Starring: Omar Sharif; Zubaida Tharwat; Rushdy Abaza; Zahrat El-Ola; Hussein Riad; Hassan Youssef
- Cinematography: Wadeed Serry
- Edited by: Fathy Kassem
- Music by: Fouad El-Zahery
- Production company: Barakat Films
- Distributed by: United Cinema; Barakat Films
- Release date: 17 April 1961 (Egypt)
- Running time: 159 minutes
- Country: Egypt
- Language: Egyptian Arabic

There Is a Man in Our House, or A Man in Our House (Egyptian Arabic: فى بيتنا رجل Fi Baytena Ragul), is a 1961 Egyptian drama, history, romance film directed by Henry Barakat. It is based on a novel of the same name by Egyptian writer Ihsan Abdel Quddous. The film stars Omar Sharif and Zubaida Tharwat. There Is a Man in Our House is listed in the Top 100 Egyptian films.

== Plot ==
Ibrahim is a young radical leader who lost his brother during a student demonstration that turned out to be very violent when the police decided to get involved and started to shoot anyone in their way. Unfortunately, Ibrahim's brother, a young smart boy, was shot to death in front of Ibrahim. When Ibrahim sees this, he plans to murder the prime minister as revenge, and he succeeds. After murdering the Prime Minister, Ibrahim seeks to hide in his friend's house, as he had no other choice whatsoever because the authorities were pursuing him. His presence in the house endangered the whole family because none of them had any criminal record nor any political activities. They were a simple middle-class family trying to stay away from such problems. Although his friend's parents were very peaceful and wanted to stay away from problems, they couldn not resist helping Ibrahim. When Ibrahim entered the house and explained to his friend's family what had happened, they accepted to hide him in their house till a solution could be found. The film then wanders through much hand wringing because both men blame themselves for jeopardizing the companion's parents, sisters, and a detested cousin. A sentiment between Ibrahim and the younger sister turns into a noteworthy sub-plot. As days pass by Ibrahim falls in love with her and decides to stay in Egypt instead of running away to Europe. This caused them a lot of problems for two reasons: The first one is that they were both from Muslim families and thus it was not easy for them to show their love openly. Second, Ibrahim was conflicted between love and militancy. Eventually, he chooses to be among the resistance fighters and ends by blowing up an ammunition cache and himself in the process.

== Cast ==
- Omar Sharif as Ibrahim
- Zubaida Tharwat as Nawal
- Rushdy Abaza as Abd El-Hamid
- Zahret El-Ola as Samia
- Hussein Riad as Zahir
- Hassan Youssef as Mohey
- Yousuf Shaaban as Fahmi
- Nahed Samir as the mother
- Abdel Khalek Saleh as Hammam Bey
- Tawfek El-Deken as El-Dabbagh
- Khalil Badr El-Dine as Fathy El-Meliguy

== Production ==
There Is a Man in Our House is based on a novel of the same name by Ihsan Abdel Quddous, adapted by Yussef Issa.

The film was directed by Henry Barakat, and falls into the genres of historical drama and romance. It starred Omar Sharif, who was not then famous in the West. Editing was by Fathy Kassem.

It was filmed in the Nassibian Studio in Cairo.

== Release ==
A Man in Our House was released in 1961.
