= List of Egyptian films of 1977 =

A list of films produced in Egypt in 1977. For an A-Z list of films currently on Wikipedia, see Category:Egyptian films.

Title	Director	Cast	Genre	Notes
Al-Azwag Al-Shayateen (Devil Husbands)	Ahmed Fouad	Adel Emam, Nahed Sherif, Madiha Kamel, Youssef Fakhr Eddine, Saeed Saleh, Laila Taher	Comedy / romance	
Gens Naem (Soft Gender)	Mohamed Abdel Aziz	Adel Emam, Magda, Samir Ghanem, Samir Sabri, Shwikar	Drama / comedy / romance	
Harami El Hob (The Thief of Love)	Abdel Moneim Shoukry	Adel Emam, Nabila Ebeid	Comedy	
Sonya wa El Majnoon (Sonya and the Madman)	Hossam Eddine Mostafa	Mahmoud Yassin, Naglaa Fathi, Nour El-Sherif	Drama	Entered into the 10th Moscow International Film Festival
Zahret Al-Banafseg (The Violet Rose)	Abdulrahman Al-Khamisi	Zubaida Tharwat, Mohamed Lotfi, Adel Emam	Drama / comedy / romance	
