= List of Egyptian films of 1978 =

A list of films produced in Egypt in 1978. For an A-Z list of films currently on Wikipedia, see Category:Egyptian films.

Title	Director	Cast	Genre	Notes
Al-Baadh Yazhab Lil Maazoun Maratain (Some People Go to an Authorized Twice)	Mohamed Abdel Aziz	Nour El-Sherif, Mervat Amin, Adel Emam, Lebleba, Samir Ghanem, George Sidhom	Comedy	
Mosafer bila Tareeq (Traveller Without A Road)	Ali Abdel Khalek	Salah Zulfikar, Mahmoud Yassin, Magda El Khatib	Thriller	
Eib Ya Lulu, Ya Lulu Eib (Shame on You, Lulu! Lulu, Shame on You!)	Sayed Tantawy	Nelly, Adel Emam, Mahmoud Abdel Aziz, Ezzat El Alaili	Drama / Comedy	
El-Mahfaza Maaya (I have the Wallet)	Mohamed Abdel Aziz	Adel Emam, Noura, Samir Sabri, Omar El-Hariri	Comedy / crime	
Al Raghba wal Thaman (Desire and Price)	Youssef Shaaban Mohamed	Salah Zulfikar, Shoukry Sarhan, Nahed Sherif	Crime thriller	
Iskandariyah... lih? (Alexandria... Why?)	Youssef Chahine	Ahmad Zaki, Naglaa Fathi	Drama	Won the Jury Grand Prix at the 29th Berlin International Film Festival
Shabab Yarqos Fawq Al-Nar (Youth Dancing on Fire)	Yehia El Alami	Adel Emam, Mahmoud Abdel Aziz, Yousra, Abdel Moneim Madbouly, Shwikar	Drama / comedy / romance	
