= Kariman =

Egyptian actress (1936–2023)

- كريمان
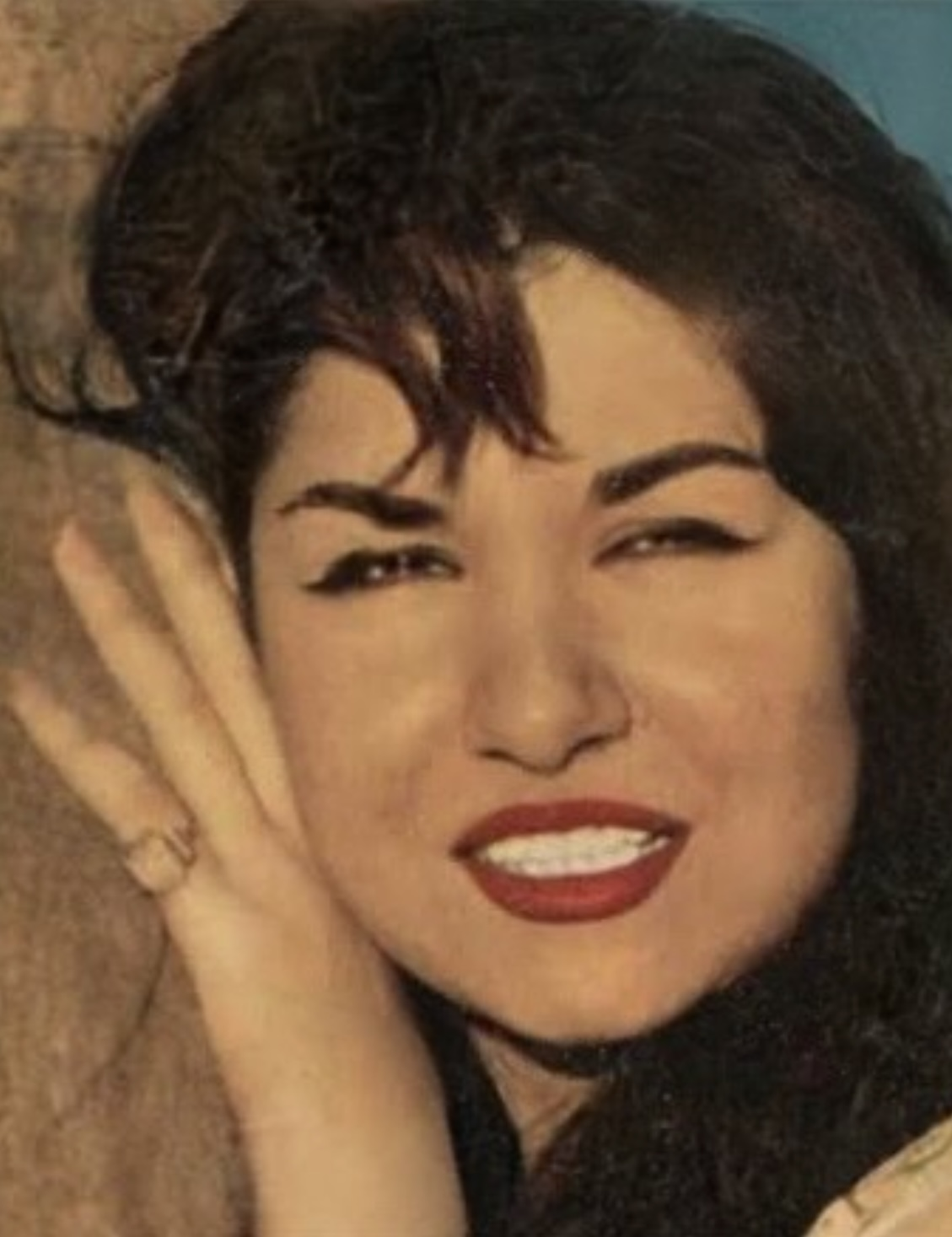
- Born: Kariman Mohamed Salem Al-Usta; 18 December 1936; Cairo, Egypt
- Died: 12 September 2023 (aged 86); Cairo, Egypt
- Other name: Cariman
- Occupations: Radio and film actress

Kariman Mohamed Salem (Arabic: كريمان مُحمَّد سليم; 18 December 1936 – 12 September 2023), best known as Kariman (also spelled Cariman, Arabic: كريمان), was an Egyptian radio and film actress.

== Life and career ==
Born in Cairo, Kariman studied at the Lycée La Liberté Héliopolis. After acting in school plays, in the 1950s she began her professional career taking part in a radio children show. She then started playing secondary roles in films, before having her breakout in 1958, thanks to the leading role in Mahmoud Zulfikar's Shabab El-Yom ("Youth of Today"). Following several popular films in the 1960s, such as; Mirati Modeer Aam ("My Wife, the Director General "), she eventually abandoned her career after her marriage to the politician Mahmoud Abu Al-Nasr.

== Death ==
She died on 12 September 2023, at the age of 86.
