= Niazi Mostafa =

Egyptian film director (1911–1986)

- Born: 11 November 1911; Asyut, Khedivate of Egypt
- Died: c. 19 October 1986 (aged 74); Giza, Egypt
- Occupation: Film director
- Notable work: The Most Dangerous Man in the World
- Spouses: Kouka (Najia Ibrahim Belal) (died 1979); Nemat Mukhtar (divorced)

Niazi Mostafa (Arabic: نيازي مصطفى, romanized: Niyāzī Muṣṭafā; 11 November 1911 – c. 19 October 1986) was an Egyptian film director. Egyptian movie critic Samīr Farīd wrote that Mostafa was one of "the most important directors in the history of Egyptian cinema".

== Early life and career ==
Mostafa was born on 11 November 1911 in the city of Asyut to a Sudanese father and Turkish mother. Mostafa would complete his university studies in Nazi Germany and joined the German Film Institute, then returning to Egypt to work as an editor at Studio Misr. In 1936, he directed several promotional documentaries for Banque Misr group companies.

== Personal life and death ==
Niazi was married twice, first to his studio colleague at the editing department, named Najia (or Tahia) Ibrahim Belal, an actress better known by her stage name Kouka or Koka, who was famous for playing the role of a Bedouin girl and starred in films such as Rabha (1945), Wedad (1936) and Mughamarat Antar wa Abla (1948). She was known as "The Egyptian Cinema Abla", dubbed "African Princess" by newspapers and most fondly remembered as the first Egyptian Actress to reach the world. She was born on March 7, 1917, in Cairo Governorate and also born to a Sudanese father like Niazi while her mother was Egyptian Arab. The pair were married after what is considered one of the most famous love stories in the artistic community, although she could not birth any children after 4 years of marriage and thus agreed to have Niazi marry a second wife which was handpicked by her, choosing a dancer Nemat Mukhtar. Niazi, however, chose to leave Mukhtar after a month and returned to his first wife Kouka, whom he described as the love of his life; he stuck by her as she was diagnosed with malignant cancer, dying on 29 January 1979, aged 62, in Alexandria, with Niazi by her side.

On 18, 19 or 20 October (Note: Most sources date the incident on 19 October.) 1986, Niazi's personal chef went to wake him up and serve him breakfast and newspapers, employed to do so since 1970. Chef was surprised to find the door locked, no one answered the knock and the chef presumed that the director was tired as he was in work for a film at the time so he left. After returning from his day job, he entered the door using a spare key obtained by Niazi's sister, Hajjah Zainab Mostafa, nearly fainting at the sight of the director lying in a pool of his own blood wearing a white robe; his were hands tied behind his back and a cloth stuffed into his mouth while the veins of his hands were cut. On 16 January 1987, the prosecutor could not find evidence against any specific person and decided to archive the investigation.

== Selected filmography ==
- Salama Is Safe or Everything Is Fine (1938) – سلامة في خير, Salāmah fī Khayr
- Si Omar (1941) – سي عمر, Sī ʿUmar
- The Wife Factory (1941) – مصنع الزوجات, Maṣnaʿ al-Zawjāt
- Rabha (1943) – رابحة, Rābiḥah
- The Valley of Stars (1943) – وادي النجوم, Wādī al-Nujūm
- Hababa (1944) – حبابة, Ḥabābah
- Hassan and Hassan (1944) – حسن وحسن, Ḥasan wa-Ḥasan
- The Magic Cap (1944) – طاقية الإخفاء, Ṭāqiyyat al-Ikhfāʾ
- Mohamed-Ali Street (1944) – شارع محمد علي, Shāriʿ Muḥammad ʿAlī
- My Daughter (1944) – ابنتي, Ibnatī
- Antar and Abla (1945) – عنتر وعبلة, ʿAntar wa-ʿAblah
- The Human Being (1945) – البني آدم, Al-Banī Ādam
- Miss Boussa (1945) – الآنسة بوسة, Al-Ānisah Būsah
- Son of the East (1945) – ابن الشرق, Ibn al-Sharq / Le Fils de l'Orient – Egyptian–Iraqi co-production
- A Glass and a Cigarette (1955) – سيجارة وكاس, Sigārah we-Kās
- A Scrap of Bread (1960) – لقمة العيش, Luʾmat el-ʿĒsh
- The Most Dangerous Man in the World (1967) – أخطر رجل في العالم, Akhṭar Rajul fī al-ʿĀlam
- Pleasure and Suffering (1971) – المتعة والعذاب, Al-Mutʿah wa-l-ʿAdhāb
- Without Pity (1971) – بلا رحمة, Bi-lā Raḥmah
- Searching for a Scandal (1973) – البحث عن فضيحة, Al-Baḥth ʿan Faḍīḥah
- A Girl Named Mahmoud – بنت اسمها محمود, Bint Ismuhā Maḥmūd (1975)
- Hereditary Madness (1975) – مجانين بالوراثة, Majānīn bi-l-Wirāthah
- The Delinquents (1976) – المنحرفون, Al-Munḥarifūn
- First Year of Love (1976) – سنة أولى حب, Sanah Ūlā Ḥubb – Co-directed by Mostafa, Salah Abou Seif, Atef Salem, Kamal al-Cheikh, and Helmi Rafla
