= Hala Fakher =

Egyptian actress

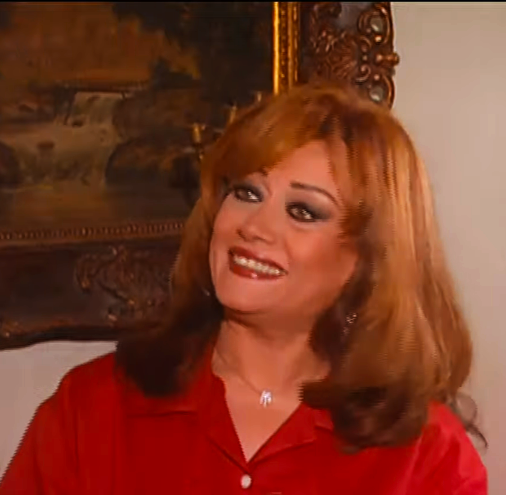
- Born: 8 June 1946 (age 79)
- Citizenship: Egypt
- Occupation: Actress

Hala Fakher (born 8 June 1946) is an Egyptian actress. She won the Best Supporting actress at the Cairo National Festival for Egyptian Cinema in 2008.

== Career ==
Fakher started her career as a child when she acted in Lann Abky Abadan.

== Filmography ==
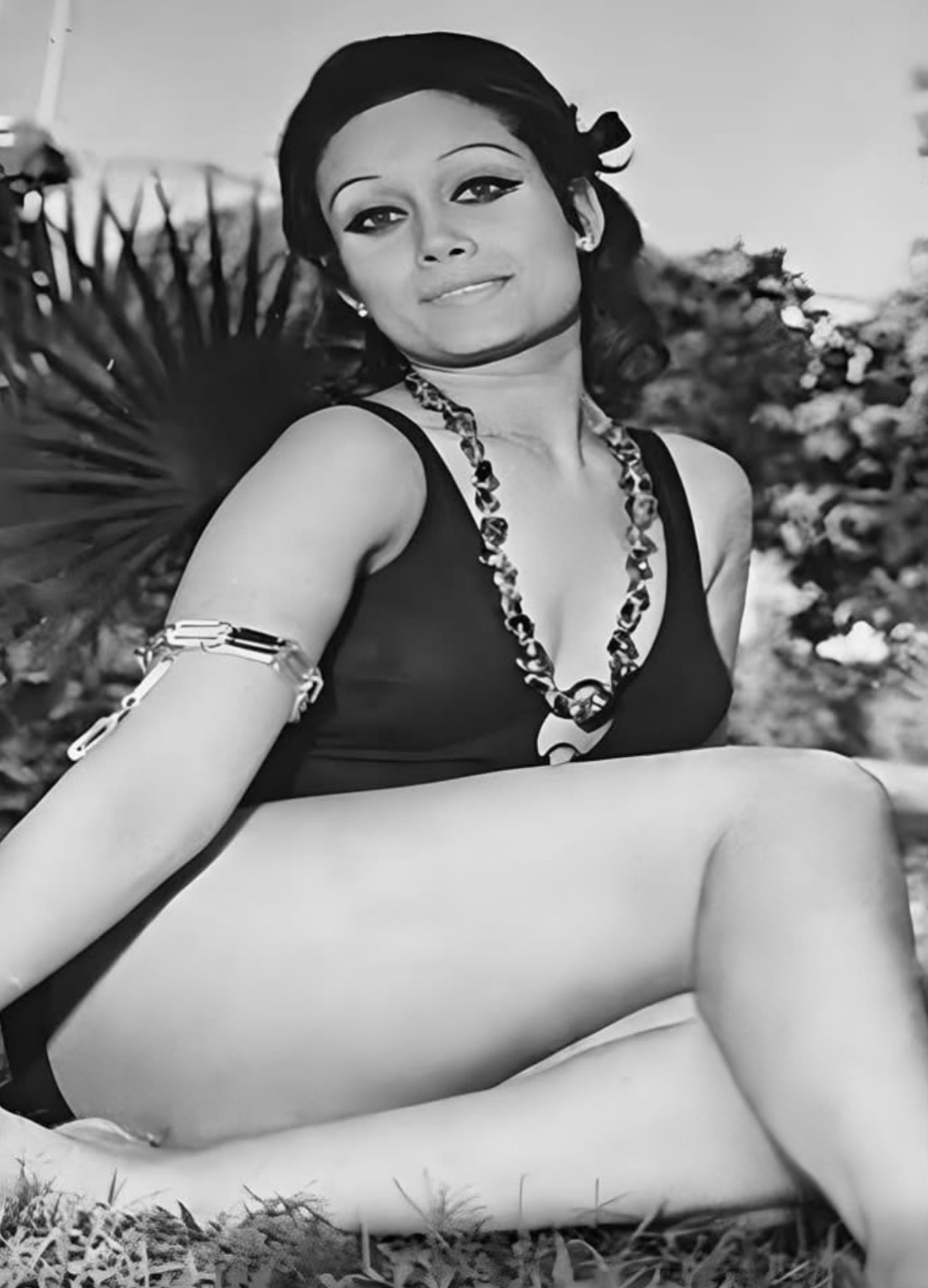
Hala Fakher in Bila Rahma (1971)

- My Wife, the Director General
- My Wife's Goblin
- Bila Rahma
- A Girl Named Mahmoud
- Wagaa Demagh
- Shahid ma shafsh Hagga
- Malak Al Qarabin
- Al Zeer Salim
- Al Layla al Al Beyda
- Al Belyatsho
- Kalabsh season 2 (TV miniseries)
- Saheb El-Maqam
- Al-Safa Secondary School for Girls
