= A Woman With a Bad Reputation =

- Directed by: Henry Barakat
- Written by: Mamdouh El Leithy
- Starring: Shams al-Baroudi; Youssef Chaban
- Release date: 1973
- Country: Egypt
- Language: Arabic

A Woman With a Bad Reputation (Arabic: امرأة سيئة السمعة "Imraah sayiah al-samah") is a 1973 Egyptian film directed by Henry Barakat and starring Shams al-Baroudi.

== Plot ==
A young man asks his wife to dance with his boss at a party. The woman gets into an affair with the boss and commits infidelity. Her marriage dissolves and her life worsens. Her son has an illness, so the wife is forced to accept gifts from the boss.

Lisa Anderson of the Chicago Tribune. uses the film as an example of more liberal filmmaking in Egypt prior to an increase in social conservatism in society. At the party in the beginning of the film, the women wear hot pants and miniskirts. The partygoers dance, smoke cigarettes, and drink alcohol. None of the women are in hijab.

== Cast ==
- Shams al-Baroudi
- Yousuf Shaaban
- Salama Elias
- Nagwa Fouad
- Emad Hamdy
- George Sidhom

== See also ==
- Cinema of Egypt
