= The Bullet is Still in My Pocket =

The Bullet Is Still in My Pocket
- Directed by: Houssam El-Din Mustafa
- Written by: Ihsan Abdel Quddous
- Produced by: Mourad Ramses Naguib; Mohsen Alam El-Din
- Starring: Mahmoud Yassine; Nagwa Ibrahim; Hussein Fahmy; Saeed Saleh; Yousuf Shaaban
- Cinematography: Ibrahim Salih
- Music by: Omar Khorshid
- Production company: Ramses Naguib
- Release date: October 6, 1974
- Running time: 125 minutes
- Country: Egypt
- Language: Egyptian Arabic

The Bullet Is Still in My Pocket (Arabic: الرصاصة لا تزال في جيبي, translit. Al Rasasa La Tazal Fi Gaiby) is a 1974 film directed by Houssam El-Din Mustafa. It is based on a story by Ihsan Abdel Quddous. In his 1998 Al-Ahram article "Victory at the Box Office" Hani Mustafa lists it as one of several films dealing with the 1973 war that depict Egyptian society in crisis before the war.

The film follows the soldier Mohammad (Mahmoud Yassine) as he returns to his village in defeat after the 1967 war, only to be met with contempt and derision. Fatima (Nagwa Ibrahim), the girl he loves has been raped by a high official (Yusuf Shaaban) and Mohammad decides to avenge her by killing the official; he finds an outlet for his frustration when the 1973 war breaks out. This time when he returns to his village he is not shamed by his fellow citizens and the official is exposed as a rapist. Mohammad marries the girl he loves with the bullet still in his pocket which means that he'll always be ready to war.

== Synopsis ==
A young soldier named Mohammad hides in Gaza with a Palestinian family helping fighters escape after the Six-Day War. There, he meets a horse groomer named Marwan al-Akhras but suspects him of being an Israeli spy. Mohammad escapes by sea and returns to his hometown haunted by PTSD from seeing comrades killed in front of him.

He gets a cold reception in his home village as if he were deemed a failure. First staying with his cousin Fatima, he learns that she is to be betrothed to Abbas, an exploitative cooperative farming boss. However, Fatima's father Ibrahim blocks the marriage and Abbas leaves with his proposal rejected, but not before raping her. Abdel Hamid, who replaces Abbas, allows more freedom of speech among the local farmers, while Mohammad leaves to avenge his cousin.

Mohammad enlists in the War of Attrition against Israel soon after. He discovers Marwan's treachery to be as suspected.

Just as Mohammad agrees with Ibrahim to marry Fatima, the Yom Kippur War breaks out. Mohammad goes to war once more, after victory, he returned with yet more emotional baggage, symbolized by the bullet he carries during the wedding.

== Cast ==
- Mahmoud Yassine (Mohammad)
- Nagwa Ibrahim (Fatma)
- Hussein Fahmy (Marwan)
- Youssef Shaaban (Abbas)
- Abdel Moneim Ibrahim (Azouz)
- Saeed Saleh (Khalil)
- Salah El-Saadany (Raouf)
- Muḥyī Ismāʻīl
- Ahmed Al Jaziri (Fatima's father Abdullah)
- Ihsan Sharif (Mohammad's mother)
- Hayat Kandeel (Zainab)
