= My Wife, the Director General =

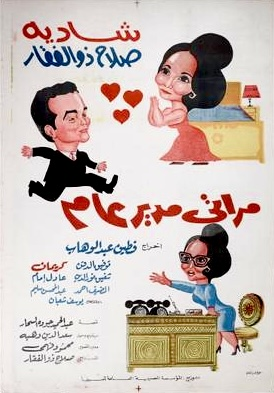
- Theatrical release poster
- Egyptian Arabic: مراتي مدير عام
- Directed by: Fatin Abdel Wahab
- Written by: Abdel Hameed Gouda Al Sahar; Saad Eldin Wahba
- Produced by: Salah Zulfikar
- Starring: Salah Zulfikar; Shadia
- Cinematography: Mahmoud Fahmy
- Edited by: Rashida Abdel Salam
- Music by: Ali Ismael
- Production company: Salah Zulfikar Films Company
- Distributed by: General Egyptian Corporation for Cinema and Television
- Release date: January 20, 1966
- Running time: 110 minutes
- Country: Egypt
- Language: Egyptian Arabic

My Wife, the Director General (Egyptian Arabic: مراتى مدير عام, translit.Miraty Modir 'Am) is a 1966 Egyptian comedy film directed by Fatin Abdel Wahab. It stars Salah Zulfikar and Shadia. The film is listed in the Top 100 Egyptian films of the 20th century.

== Plot ==
Hussein Omar, the head of the projects department, is surprised by the transfer of his wife, Ismat Fahmy, as the general manager of the construction company he works for. This stems from many paradoxes from his co-workers and the different temperament of his wife in dealing with him at work from home.

== Cast ==
- Salah Zulfikar as Hussein Omar
- Shadia as Ismat Fahmy
- Tawfik El Deken as Abou El Khir Hassanein
- Yousuf Shaaban as the director's secretary
- Shafik Nour El Din as Abdel 'Awy
- Kariman as Aida
- El Deif Ahmed as Hotel waiter
- Adel Emam as Abou El Magd
- Abdul Mohsen Selim as Suleiman
- Hussein Ismail as The janitor
- Hala Fakher as Nawal
- Nabila El-Sayed as The Maid
- Hassan Atlah as Abu Khalil
- Muhammad Shawqi as the driver

== See also ==
- Cinema of Egypt
- 1966 in film
- Salah Zulfikar filmography
- List of Egyptian films of the 1960s
