= Love Humiliates =

- الحب بهدلة
- Directed by: Salah Abu Seif
- Written by: Salah Abu Seif
- Produced by: Gamal Hamdy
- Starring: Hoda Shams El Din; Mohamed Amin (singer); Ismail Yassine
- Release date: February 21, 1952
- Running time: 100 minutes
- Country: Egypt
- Language: Arabic

Love Humiliates (Arabic: الحب بهدلة, transliterated as Al-habu bihadla; title also translated Love is Humiliation, Love is a Scandal or Love is a Problem) is an Egyptian film released on February 21, 1952. The film is written and directed by Salah Abu Seif, and stars Hoda Shams El Din, Mohamed Amin, Ismail Yassine, Thoraya Helmy, and Mohamed El-Bakkar.

== Synopsis ==
Three girls working in a nightclub are dating three young men who work at the same one; one of the former is a dancer and one of the latter is a singer in love with her who dreams of her performing a show he composed. When the wealthy owner of the club refuses to let her perform the song and dance, he decides to rent a cabaret with his colleagues. The dancer tries to join them, but the owner of the cabaret kidnaps her, leaving the singer and his friends to try to rescue her.

== Context ==
The film is considered a light comedy belonging to the director’s "experimental phase"(1946-1952), when he approached 8 different genres in as many films.

== See also ==
- Women in Egypt
- Egyptian revolution of 1952
