= Ashiaa la toshtra =

- أشياء لا تشترى
- Directed by: Ahmed Diaa Eddine
- Written by: Amin Yousseff Ghurab; Abduljawad al-Dhani (scenario)
- Produced by: Kamel Madkour
- Starring: Nour El-Sherif; Shams al-Baroudi; Yehia Chahine
- Music by: Maali Al-Hefnawy and Abdulaziz Fakhri (sound editing); Rowaida Adnan and Soheir El-Barouni (vocals); Hassan Nashaat and Hussein Ghobashi (music and lyrics)
- Production company: Egyptian General Organization for Cinema and Television
- Release date: 1970
- Running time: 95
- Country: Egypt
- Language: Arabic

Ashiaa la toshtra (Arabic: أشياء لا تشترى, lit. “Things Not to Buy”) is an Egyptian film released in 1970. It was written by Amin Youssef Ghorab, directed by Ahmed Diaa Eddine, and produced by the Egyptian General Film Organization. The film stars Nour El-Sherif, Shams al-Baroudi, and Yehia Chahine.

== Synopsis ==
A rich mayor marries a vivacious woman in Cairo and visits her weekly. His daughter Samira, meanwhile, is in love with her cousin Youssef. The mayor’s wife falls in love with Samira’s music teacher Mahmoud, who comes to her house regularly when Samira does. The mayor’s wife begins spending his money on Mahmoud and leaves him bankrupt, prompting Samira to expose the truth.

== Cast ==
- Yehia Chahine
- Shams al-Baroudi
- Nour El-Sherif
- Nahed Gabr
- Abu Bakr Ezzat
- Soheir El-Barouni
- Ibrahim Emara
- Adel Al-Muhalimi
- Mohamed El-Touni
- Mahmoud Kamel
- Farouk Hanafi
- Rowaida Adnan
