= Khalid bin Saud Al Saud =

Saudi royal and government official (1925–2020)

Commander of National Guard
- In office: 1956 – 1959
- Predecessor: Tribal sheiks
- Successor: Saad bin Saud Al Saud
- Monarch: Saud
- Born: 1925; Mecca
- Died: 7 July 2020 (aged 94–95)
- Spouse: List: Al Anoud bint Muhammad bin Abdulaziz; Maha bint Mohsen Nashi Al Sharif; Shams Al Baroudi; Suhair Ramzi; Sabah
- Issue: 1
Names
- Khalid bin Saud bin Abdulaziz
- House: Al Saud
- Father: King Saud
- Mother: Jamila Asaad Ibrahim Merhi

Khalid bin Saud Al Saud (Arabic: خالد بن سعود آل سعود; 1925 – 7 July 2020) was a member of the House of Saud, one of the grandsons of Saudi Arabia's founder King Abdulaziz. He was one of the sons of King Saud and held various administrative positions during the reign of his father. He was the first member of the Saudi royal family to command the Saudi National Guard.

== Early life and education ==
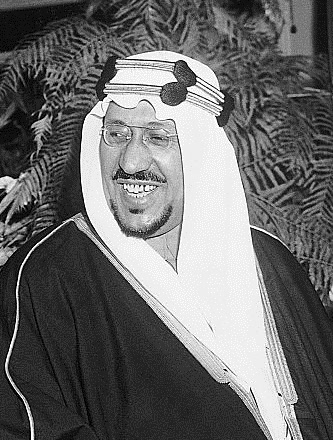
King Saud, father of Prince Khalid

Khalid was born in Mecca in 1925 and was the ninth son of King Saud. His father King Saud is a son of Saudi's founder King Abdulaziz. His mother was Jamila Asaad Ibrahim Merhi who was of Syrian origin. Jamila and her father, Asaad Ibrahim, were charged with planning to assassinate Gamal Abdel Nasser, President of the United Arab Republic, in March 1958, and they were both tried in absentia in Damascus.

Following the completion of high school education, Prince Khalid received a university degree in 1948.

== Career ==
Khalid bin Saud was first made an assistant to his father, King Saud, and remained in the post until 1955. In June 1957, he was appointed as the commander of the Saudi National Guard. Prince Khalid became the first Saudi royal to lead the Guard which had been headed by tribal sheikhs. Robert Lacey reports that King Saud asked Prince Khalid to reorganize the Guard to protect the royal family. In addition, following Khalid's appointment, the Guard began to have independent and substantial funds for the first time to improve its quite limited capabilities. His half-brother Prince Saad replaced him in the post in 1959. Khalid's next position was the director of King Saud University to which he was appointed in 1959. On 7 March 1962, he was made the head of the royal court.

== Personal life and death ==
Prince Khalid married five times, and his first wife, Al Anoud, was a daughter of Prince Mohammed bin Abdulaziz. Then he married Maha bint Mohsen Nashi Al Sharif. Shams Al Baroudi, an Egyptian actress, was his next wife, and their marriage lasted only three months. Then he wed another Egyptian actress, Suhair Ramzi, and the marriage lasted for a year. His marriage to the Lebanese singer Sabah lasted for only one month.

Prince Khalid had a daughter who was born in 1974.

Following the removal of King Saud in 1964, Khalid accompanied his father in exile, and was his only son who did not return to Saudi Arabia even for the funeral of his father in 1969.

On 7 July 2020, Khalid bin Saud died at age 95 in an undisclosed foreign country.
