= Henry Barakat =

Egyptian film director (1914–1997)

Henri Antoun Barakat هنري بركات
- Born: 11 June 1914; Cairo, Egypt
- Died: 27 May 1997 (age 82); Cairo, Egypt
- Occupation: Film director
- Years active: 1942–1992
- Notable work: The Nightingale's Prayer
- Spouse: Rosette Dahan

Henry Antoun Barakat (Arabic: هنري أنطون بركات, 11 June 1914, Cairo – 27 May 1997, Cairo) was a well known Egyptian film director.

== Biography ==
He was born in Shubra to a Melkite Greek Catholic father of Syro-Lebanese descent, and a Syro-Lebanese mother. His father, Dr. Antoun Barakat, was a physician and received the title of Beik by the King for the services he rendered. During a career spanning for 50 years. He worked in different eras of the Egyptian film industry, directed 65 films, many of which are considered notable in Egyptian cinema.

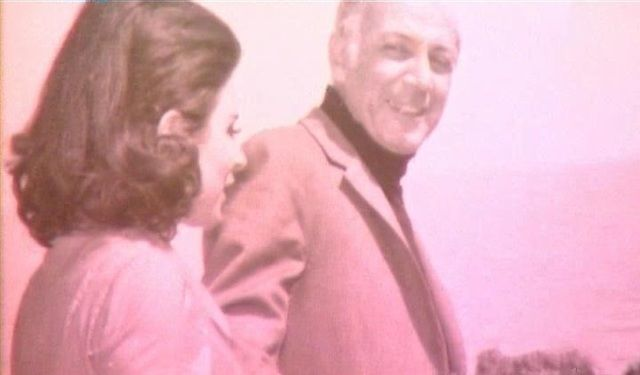
Barakat with Soad Hosny behind the scenes in 1970

He made a large number of films with a number of extremely famous stars, including ten films with Farid Al-Atrash, three films with Abdel Halim Hafez, three films with Layla Mourad, two films with Salah Zulfikar, two films with Sabah, two films with Mohamed Fawzi, two films with Fairuz, and two films with Hoda Sultan. However, the biggest share went to the Faten Hamama, with whom he directed 18 films, some of which are among the most important films in Egyptian cinema.

== Filmography ==
Year	Title	Arabic Title
1942	If I Were Rich	Law kunt ghani
1942	The Suspect	El-Muttahama
1942	The Wanderer	El-charid
1944	What Madness!	Imma guinan
1945	This Was My Father's Crime	Haza ganahu abi
1945	The Heart Has Its Reasons	El-qalb louh wahid
1947	The Lady	El-Khanum
1947	The Love of My Life	Habib al omr
1948	Duty	El-Wajeb
1948	Quiet Nights	Sagua el lail
1948	Punishment	el-Ikab
1949	Little Miss Devil	Afrita Hanem
1950	Shore of Love	Shati el Gharam
1950	Just My Luck!	Maalesh ya zahar
1951	The Count of Monte Cristo	Amir el antikam
1951	Flowers of Love	Ward el gharam
1952	From One Heart to Another	Min al kalb al kalb
1952	Don't Tell Anyone	Ma takulshi la hada
1952	Immortal Song	Lahn al khouloud
1952	Love Has No Remedy	Amal-el hawa malush
1953	I Fear for My Child	Kalbi ala waladi
1953	The Rule of Time	Hukum el zama
1953	A Father's Mistake	Ghaltet ab
1953	I Am Alone	Ana wahdi
1954	The Love Message	Ressalet gharam
1954	With You Forever	Daiman maak
1954	I Am Love	Ana el hub
1955	Pity My Tears	Irham demoui
1955	It Happened One Night	Hadassa zata laila
1955	Days and Nights	Ayyam wa layali
1956	The Story of My Love	Kusset hubi
1956	Appointment with Love	Mawad gharam
1957	Girls of Today	Banat el yom
1958	I'll See You	Hatta naltaki
1959	I Have No One But You	Malish gherak
1959	Have Pity on My Love	Irham hubbi
1959	The Nightingale's Prayer	Doaa al-Karawan
1959	Hassan and Nayima	Hassan wa Nayima
1961	Love Beach	Shatie el hub
1961	There Is a Man in Our House	Fi baitina rajul
1962	A Day Without Tomorrow	Yomun bala ghaden
1963	Silken Chains	Salassel min harir
1963	The Open Door	El-Bab el maftuh
1964	The Crafty One	Amir el dahaa
1965	The Sin	Al Haram
1966	It Happened During My Life	Shaia fi hayati
1966	Safar Barlek	
1966	The Wedding Night	Lailat el zafaf
1967	Fille du gardien	Bint El-Harass
1968	Three Women	Thalath Nesa
1969	The Big Love	al-Hob al kabir
1971	Thin Thread	al-Kheit al rafeigh
1971	Witch	Sahira
1973	A Woman with a Bad Reputation	Imra'a Saye'af Al-Somaa
1975	A Sweet Melody	Nagm fi hayati
1975	My Lover	Habibati
1977	Mouths and Rabbits	Afwah wa araneb
1979	No Consolation for Women	Ualla azae lel sayedat
1984	The Capture of Fatma	Leilet al quabd al Fatma
1991	Wicked Game	Loubat El Ashrar
1992	The Accused	El-Mottahama

== Awards and honors ==
2 wins & 3 nominations

Berlin International Film Festival

- 1959 Nominated Golden Berlin Bear Hassan wa Nayima (1959)
- 1960 Nominated Golden Berlin Bear Doa al karawan (1959)

Cannes Film Festival

- 1965 Nominated Golden Palm El Haram, (1965)

Jakarta Film Festival

- 1964 Won Best Film Bab el maftuh, El (1964)

Valencia Festival of Mediterranean Cinema

- 1984 Won Special Mention Leilet al quabd al Fatma (1984)

Egypt State Incentive Prize in Arts and Letters of the Supreme Council of Culture, 1995.

== See also ==
- Lists of Egyptians

== In the Press ==
The best of Egyptian cinema, the 15 best Egyptian films of all time
