= The Guilty (1975 film) =

- Arabic: المذنبون
- Directed by: Said Marzouk
- Written by: Naguib Mahfouz
- Screenplay by: Mamdouh El Leithy
- Produced by: Ihab El Leithy
- Starring: Hussein Fahmy; Salah Zulfikar; Soheir Ramzi
- Cinematography: Mahmoud Bakr
- Edited by: Said El Sheikh
- Music by: Gamal Salama
- Production company: Ihab El Leithy Films
- Distributed by: Ihab El Leithy Films
- Release date: 23 September 1975
- Running time: 111 minutes
- Country: Egypt
- Language: Egyptian Arabic

The Guilty (Arabic: المذنبون, translit: Al Mothneboon) is a 1975 Egyptian crime thriller based on a story of Egyptian writer Naguib Mahfouz and directed by Said Marzouk. It features an ensemble cast that includes Hussein Fahmy, Salah Zulfikar, Emad Hamdy, Kamal El-Shennawi, Zubaida Tharwat and featuring Soheir Ramzi as Sanaa Kamel, among others.

The events of the film center around a murder in which the actress Sanaa Kamel is the victim, and the investigations that extend to all those connected with the dead woman, until the investigations also reach to its branching relationships with several prominent and influential people in power showing all types of corruption in the society at the time. The Guilty was released in 1976 and is listed in the Top 100 films in Egyptian cinema of the 20th century.

== Plot ==
Famous actress Sanaa Kamel gets killed in her bed, and the investigator begins to search for the killer, summoning all the invitees who were in her house the night of her death, starting from her fiancé, who reported the crime that he heard someone stabbing his wife while he was calling her, to the school principal who leaked the exam, and the director of the association, the one who sells subsidized goods to the rich and delivers them to them at home, and Hafez the head of the contracting company who helps the actress build buildings, and cheats on his friend with his wife on the same night, including the actress Sanaa, to the young stallion who sells his body to the actress while at the same time plotting his plan to steal the treasury of an institution, there is also a man at the top of power who frequents the actress's bed in order to have a good time. Everyone who was at the party is arrested, after the prosecution revealed that the crimes they committed during the concert were no less than the murder of an actress in her bed. The investigator discovers the disappearance of a precious earring was with the actress and knows that its owner is the mother of the preacher, and her fiancé, the director, admits that he killed her out of jealousy, as he saw her in bed with a man of authority.

== Primary cast ==
- Hussein Fahmy as Ahmed
- Salah Zulfikar as Hafez
- Suhair Ramzi as Sanaa Kamel
- Emad Hamdy as Alif
- Kamal El-Shennawi as Senior statesman
- Zubaida Tharwat as Mona
- Yusuf Shaaban as Tahseen
- Adel Adham as Mamdouh
- Samir Ghanem El faseq
- Wahid Seif as Samy
- Ibrahim Khan as Thief
- Hayat Qandeel as Amina
- Samir Sabry as himself
- Omar Al-Hariri as Hussein
- Tawfik Al-Deqen as Fahmy

== Reception ==
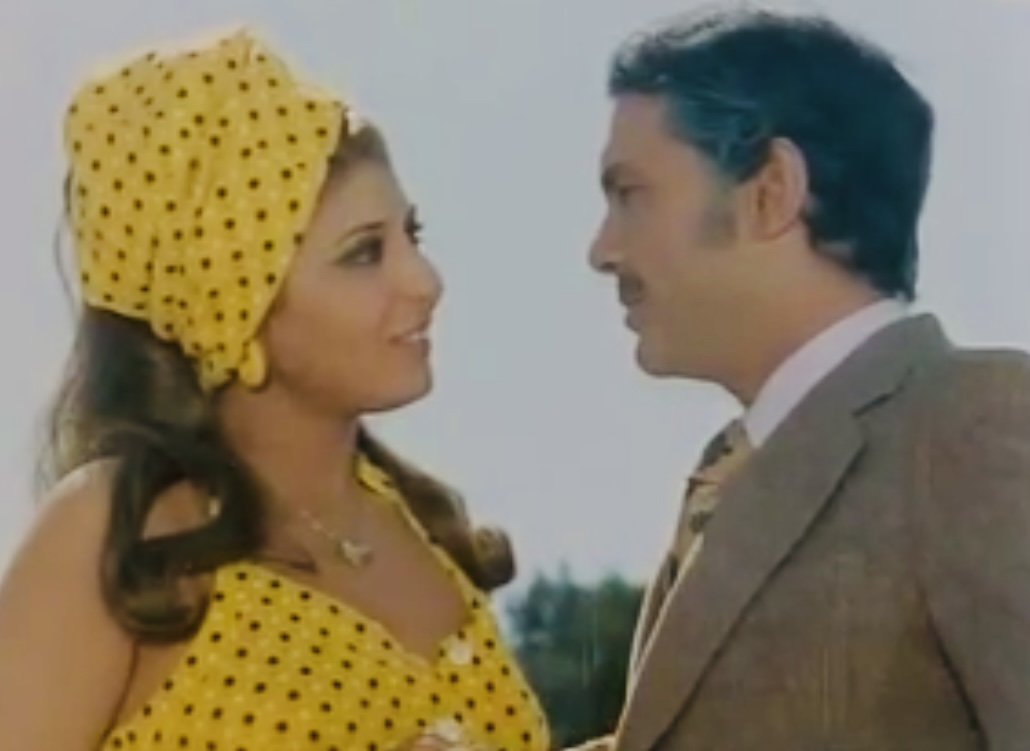
Salah Zulfikar and Soheir Ramzi during shooting The Guilty

“Egyptian Censorship authority of artistic works” did not go through a crisis like that experienced in 1977 because of the film, The Guilty. The censor's permission to show the film led to the punishment of all the censorship calibres responsible for this permission..It also led to the issuance of new censorship laws. The Guilty was the fourth feature film by director Said Marzouk The story was written by Naguib Mahfouz while the script and dialogue was written by Mamdouh El-Leithy, its events revolve in the form of a police investigation about the murder of a famous film actress during one of the nights, which included a large group of the various personalities of society..When these personalities are investigated as being accused of the crime of murder, it becomes clear that each of them has a crime of corruption no less than murder in its ugliness..This is a school headmaster who leaks the exam..and this is a doctor who performs abortions..and this is an engineer who cheats in construction. And so on.

The film was blatant in exposing corruption in a way that seems strange to Egyptian cinema.. In addition to containing a large number of daring sexual scenes..But the film's screening in the official competition for the first session of the Cairo International Film Festival and its excellent reception by international critics made the censors tend to the film that was allowed to be shown, especially since the movie Al-Karnak around which censorship problems revolved in 1975 had been decided to show it by a political decision, which means that the world-state trend tends to encourage freedom of expression..Indeed, the censors agreed to show the film, which happened on September 23, 1976. In addition to displaying it in several Arab capitals.

After the film was shown, the Parliament received many letters from Egyptians working abroad calling for opposition of the film, because it offends them in the countries in which they work, as it exposes the deviations of Egyptian society and the corruption of many of its segments. The Council referred these letters to the Minister of Information and Culture at that time, Dr. Gamal Al-Atifi to take the necessary action. He decided to stop showing the film and transfer its entire censorship file to the Administrative Prosecution to punish the agency..Then he issued Resolution No. 220 of 1976 regarding tightening the basic rules for censorship of artistic works, a decision that filmmakers considered a crime against Egyptian cinema, as the most important of its provisions was to ban all scenes, movements and phrases with sexual significance, prohibiting dance scenes, not showing crimes of revenge and taking revenge, not displaying suicide, not presenting social problems in a way that calls for spreading despair in the hearts of the masses. As for the oversight body, its head, “Excellent Moderation,” was referred to retirement and transferred, along with 14 others from the agency, to the Supreme Disciplinary Court on charges of gross breach of job duties.

== See also ==
- Egyptian cinema
- Salah Zulfikar on screen and stage
- List of Egyptian films of the 1970s
