= Salama Is Okay =

1937 film

- Directed by: Niazi Mostafa
- Written by: Naguib el-Rihani; Badi Khayri
- Produced by: Studio Misr
- Starring: Naguib el-Rihani; Hussein Riad; Raqiya Ibrahim; Rawhiyya Khaled; Hassan Fayek
- Cinematography: Mohamed Abdel Azim
- Edited by: Mustapha Galal
- Music by: Abdulhamid Abdrrahman, Muhamad Hassan Asshugai
- Release date: 1937
- Running time: 98 minutes
- Country: Egypt
- Language: Arabic

Salama Is Okay or Salama Is Safe (Arabic: سلامة في خير, romanized: Salāma fī Khayr), sometimes given as Everything Is Fine, is a 1937 comedy film by the Egyptian director Niazi Mostafa, written by and starring Naguib el-Rihani. Salama Is Okay is a member in the Top 100 Egyptian films list.

== Synopsis ==
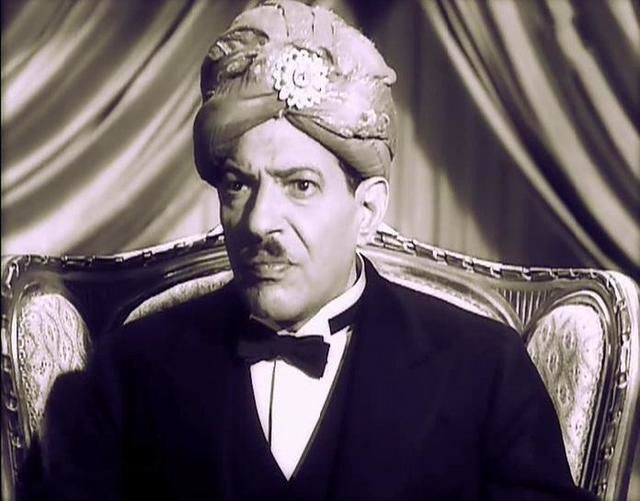
Naguib el-Rihani as Salama

Salama, head porter at a large fabric store, and the most honest man in Cairo, is accused of having stolen money after a series of unfortunate incidents. Luckily, "he is okay".
