= A Girl Named Mahmoud =

1975 Egyptian comedy film directed by Niazi Mostafa

- Directed by: Niazi Mostafa
- Written by: Ahmed Abdel Wahab; Bahgat Kamar
- Starring: Soheir Ramzy; Mohamed Reda; Samir Ghanem; Zinat Sidqi; Hala Fakher
- Release date: January 1, 1975
- Running time: 102 minutes
- Country: Egypt
- Language: Arabic

A Girl Named Mahmoud (Arabic: بنت اسمها محمود, romanized: Bint Ismuhā Maḥmūd) is a 1975 Egyptian comedy film directed by Niazi Mustafa. The film stars Soheir Ramzy, Mohamed Reda, Samir Ghanem, Zinat Sidqi and Hala Fakher. It was released in Egypt in January 1975.

== Plot ==
Hamida (Suhair Ramzi) is the daughter of an illiterate widower, al-Hag Firghalee. Firghalee attempts to prevent his daughter from studying at a university, so the medical student Hassan helps her. After Firghalee reveals he will marry Hamida to a boy she dislikes, Hassan has her disguise herself as a man, Mahmoud. Hassan and his friends lie to Firghalee, telling him they performed surgery to change Hamida into a man. Hamida's disguise has an effeminate appearance, and both male and female employees at Firghalee's furniture shop are attracted to "Mahmoud" and many conclude "he" is a homosexual.

Firghalee's father mistakenly believes that "Mahmoud" is a homosexual when he sees "him" kiss Hassan. He arranges to have Lawahith, a cabaret entertainer, meet "Mahmood" to set "his" sexuality straight, but "Mahmoud" is not attracted to women and is unwilling to sleep with Lawahith. One woman says that she has the child of "Mahmoud" and two women claim to be engaged to "Mahmoud". After a doctor mistakenly states "Mahmoud" is pregnant, Hamida reveals her true identity. She and Hassan marry.

== Cast ==
- Samir Sabry as Hassan
- Soheir Ramzy as Hamida/Mahmoud
- Mohamed Reda as Farghali
- Samir Ghanem as Wahid
- Zinat Sidqi as Om Ibrahim
- Hala Fakher as Suad
- Sayed Zayan as Sayed Kolonia
- Salama Elias as University Teacher
- Fatma Omara as Tawhida
- Soheir El-Barouni as Lawahez

== Reception ==
Samar Habib, author of Female Homosexuality in the Middle East: Histories and Representations, wrote that the film "exploits the genre of transvestism as comedy" and that "several homoerotic images can be presented safely and innocently to mainstream audiences" through a female character pretending to be a male. She explained that because no characters consciously desire those of the same sex and because Hamida is still a woman, the film puts the audience "at ease". Habib added that "the question of [whether homoeroticism is forbidden in religion] does not surface so much as the issues of cultural belief, perhaps because the two can sometimes be interchangeable."

Habib concluded that the film does not successfully thoroughly examine homoerotic desire and that the film "attempts to rationalize homosexuality as a form of transgenderism (women who desire other women must be essentially men)".

== See also ==
- Arab cinema
- Culture of Egypt
- Lists of Egyptian films
- Cinema of Egypt
- List of LGBTQ-related films of 1975
