= Shams al-Baroudi =

Egyptian actress (born 1945)

Shams Elbaroudi
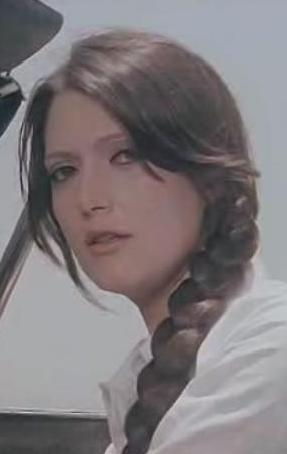
- Born: October 4, 1945 (age 81); Warraq al-Hadar, Giza, Kingdom of Egypt (present-day Egypt)
- Other names: Shams Elbarudi; Chams Elbarudi
- Years active: 1961–1984
- Notable work: Pleasure and Suffering; Malatily Bathhouse; The Other Man; A Woman With a Bad Reputation
- Spouse(s): Prince Khalid bin Saud (m. 1969; div. 1970) Hassan Youssef (m. 1972; died 2024)
- Children: 4
- Relatives: Ghada Adel (niece)

Shams Elbaroudi (Arabic: شمس البارودي October 4, 1945) is an Egyptian former actress who was active in Egyptian films during the 1960s and 1970s. Elbaroudi was described by Lisa Anderson of the Chicago Tribune as "one of the most beautiful and glamorous of Egypt's actresses".

== Early life ==
She was born in Cairo, Egypt to an Egyptian-born father with Syrian roots and an Egyptian mother. Al-Baroudi studied at the Higher Institute of Dramatic Arts in Cairo for two and a half years.

== Career ==
She made her cinema debut in Ismail Yassin's comedy Hired Husband (زوج بالإيجار) in 1961. After a prolific career in the 1960s, she came under spotlight with "transgressive" roles in early 1970s, such as her role in Salah Zulfikar's psychological drama The Other Man (الرجل الآخر), and Malatily Bathhouse (حمام الملاطيلي) by Salah Abu Seif, both films released in 1973.

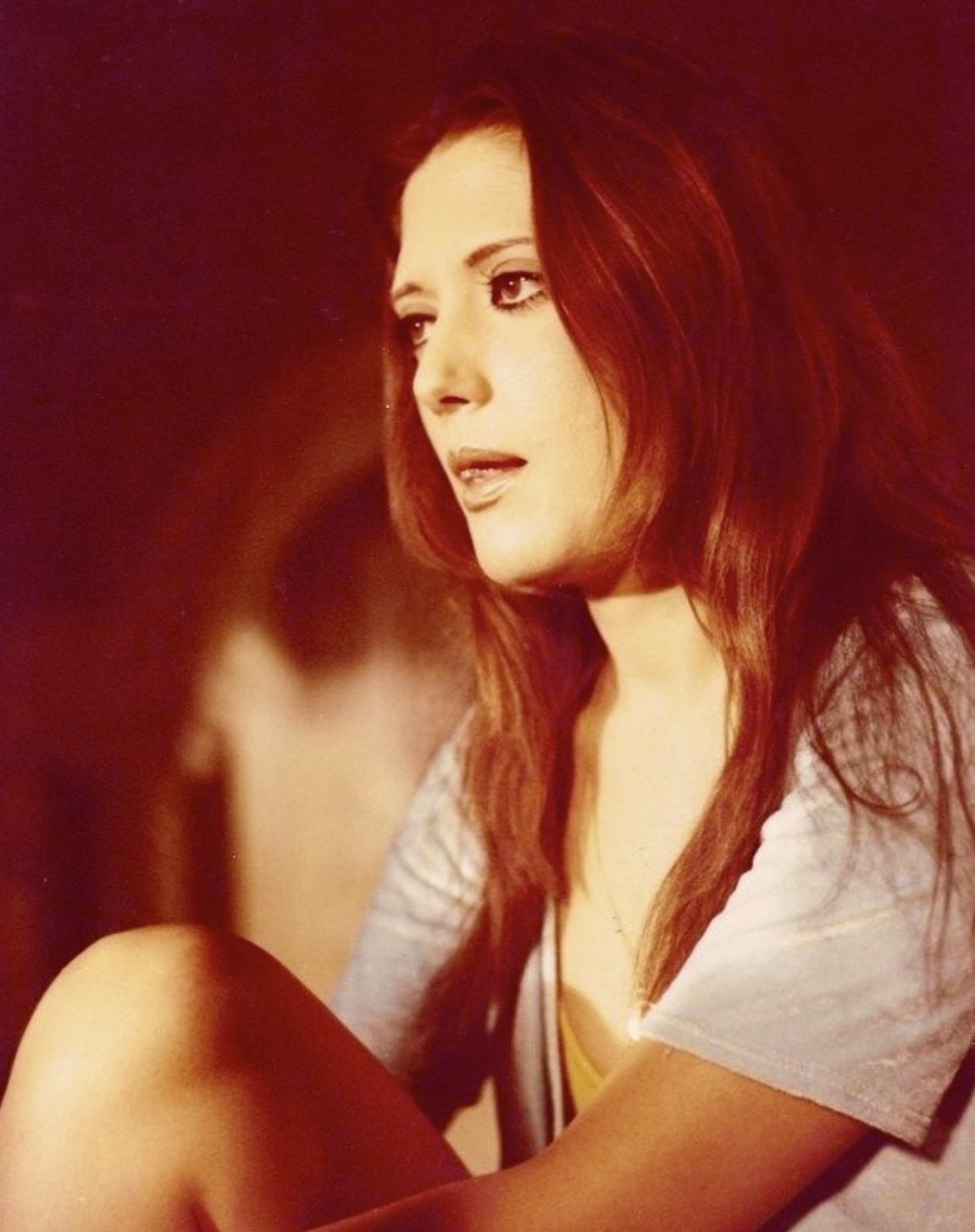
al-Baroudi in Malatily Bathhouse (1973)

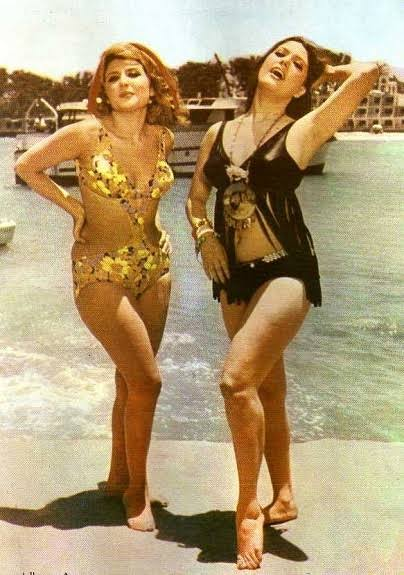
al-Baroudi (right) with Soheir Ramzi in the 1970s

After marriage to fellow actor Hassan Youssef in 1972, the couple started to work in cooperation until al-Baroudi decided after Umrah in 1982 to quit cinema and wear the hijab. At that time Youssef was still filming Two on the Road (اثنين على الطريق) and after al-Baroudi's unexpected retirement, the film could only be completed and released by 1984.

== After retirement ==
In 2001, Nourah Abdul Aziz Al-Khereiji of the Arab News interviewed al-Baroudi in the 2001 Al-Madinah Festival. Al-Baroudi described her acting era as "the time of ignorance," the name Muslims use to refer to the pre-Islamic era. As of 2004, she was wearing a niqab and her sole television appearances were on religious satellite channels. By 2008, she stopped wearing the niqab and only wore the veil.

Lisa Anderson used al-Baroudi as an example of an increase in social conservatism in Egyptian society.

== Personal life ==
Elbaroudi married Saudi prince Khalid bin Saud in 1969, and divorced after 13 months. Since 1972, she is married to actor Hassan Youssef. One of their sons, Omar H. Youssef is also an actor. Her niece, Reem El is also an actress.

== Selected filmography ==
Filmography for al-Baroudi
Date	Title	Role	Notes
1966	The Last-Born, "Akher el ankud"		
1970	Things Not to Buy, "Ashiaa la toshtra"		
1971	Pleasure and Suffering, "al-Mutât wal-Âzab"		
1973	Malatily Bathhouse, "Ĥamam al-Malaṯily"		
1973	The Other Man, "Al Rajul Al Akhar"	Salwa	
1973	A Woman With a Bad Reputation, "Imraah sayiah al-samah"	Hanaa	This film is also known as "Notorious Woman".
1978	The Criminal, "El-Mugrem"		

== See also ==
- Cinema of Egypt
