= Salah Abu Seif =

Egyptian film director (1915–1996)

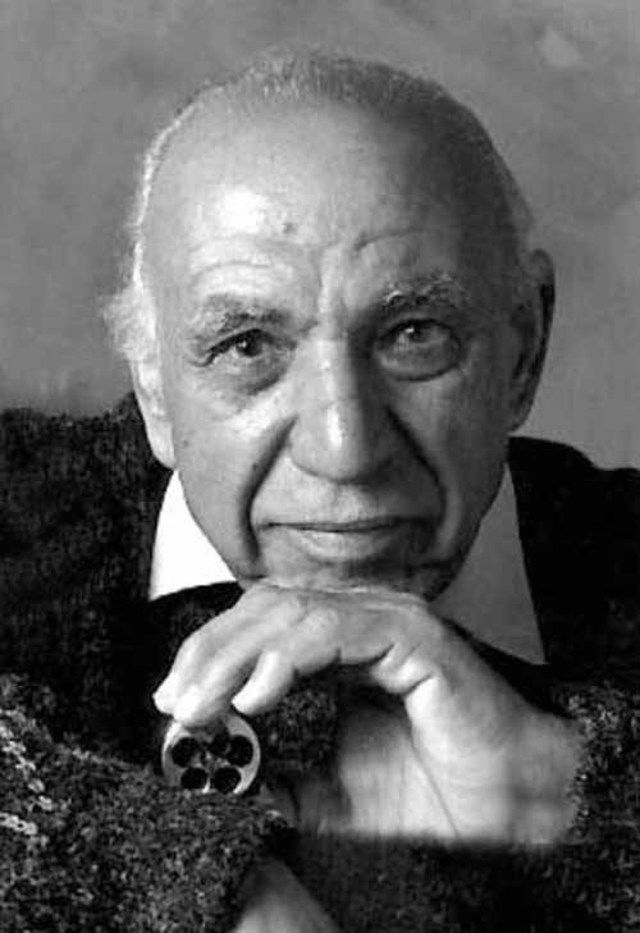
- Born: May 10, 1915; Cairo, Sultanate of Egypt
- Died: June 23, 1996 (aged 81)
- Occupations: Film director, screenwriter

Salah Abu Seif (Arabic: صلاح أبو سيف, Ṣalāḥ Abū Sayf) (May 10, 1915 – June 23, 1996) was a prominent Egyptian film director and screenwriter. He is considered to be the godfather of Neorealist cinema in Egyptian cinema.

Many of the 41 films he directed are considered Egyptian classics; eight of them rank in the Bibliotheca Alexandrina’s list of 100 Greatest Egyptian Films, the most of any director. Another 1997 Top 100 ranking by Egyptian film critics lists eleven of Abu Seif's films, right behind Youssef Chahine with twelve films.

His film The Beginning and the End (1960) was the first adaptation of a novel by Nobel Prize winner Naguib Mahfouz. In 1977 he was a member of the jury at the 10th Moscow International Film Festival.

== Early life ==
Abu-Seif was born in 1915, in Cairo's ancient quarter of Boolaq, to landowning parents from Upper Egypt. He was 12 years old when he saw the first full- length feature film made by an Egyptian, in 1927, at a local movie-house - earlier films were imports accompanied by Egyptian narrations, or made by Europeans living in Egypt. As the son of a conservative family, Abu-Seif graduated from the Cairo College of Commerce and Economics in 1932, while at the same time working as a freelance reporter following movie stars. But it was at his day job as a clerk in a factory that he met the Egyptian film-maker Niazy Mustapha, who was on a shoot there. Mustapha made him a film editor.

In 1939, Abu-Seif won a scholarship to study film in Paris. Within five years of his return in 1942, he had established himself as one of the most avant-garde second generation film-makers in the country. He pioneered shooting on location - though he also used reconstructions - in places none of his predecessors had dared to visit, like ghurza (the equivalent of old Chinese opium dens), brothels and impoverished areas whose existence had never been officially acknowledged.

== Career ==
Abu Seif began his career as a film editor in films such as Aydah (1942), before making his feature directorial debut with the film Always in my Heart (1946).

Many of his films had political implications. The Case '68 and Malatily Bathhouse were influenced by the Six-Day War. Both films dealt with the changing social climate of post-war Egypt. They experienced troubled production and release history, including protests against their release by the Arab Socialist Union.

== Style ==
His style was initially influenced by the works of Egyptian director Kamal Selim.

Abu Seif first encountered neorealism on a trip to Rome, and adopted techniques used by Italian filmmakers, such as dubbing over dialogue to ensure the quality of the audio. He employed several distinct techniques in his films, such as the use of popular music, realistic characters and storylines, and location shooting. When locations were not available to him for filming, he reconstructed sets with great detail to render them as accurate as possible to their real world counterparts.

Abu Seif’s preference for realistic stories and settings allowed him to form a close relationship with his audience, who would have seen themselves represented in his films. He was described as “the artist of the Egyptian people” due to the reflective and observational nature of his work.

== Filmography ==
Year	Title	Arabic Title	Notes
1946	Always in My Heart	Dayman fi Qalbi دايماً في قلبي	
1947	The Avenger	Al-Muntaqim المنتقم	
1948	The Adventures of Antar and Abla	Mughamarat Antar wa Abla مغامرات عنتر وعبلة	Nominated for "Grand Prize of the Festival" at the 1949 Cannes Film Festival
1948	Street of the Acrobat Sharia	al-Bahlawan شارع البهلوان	
1950	The Falcon	Al-Sakr الصقر	
1950	Love is a Problem	Al-Hob Bahdala الحب بهدلة	
1951	Your Day Will Come	Lak Yawm Ya Zalem لك يوم يا ظالم	
1952	Foreman Hassan	Al-Osta Hassan الأسطى حسن	
1953	Raya and Sekina	Raya wa Sekina ريا وسكينة	
1954	The Monster	Al-Wahsh الوحش	Nominated for "Grand Prize of the Festival" at the 1954 Cannes Film Festival
1956	A Woman's Youth	Shabab Emraa شباب إمرأة	Nominated for "Golden Palm" at the 1956 Cannes Film Festival
1957	The Tough	Al-Fetewa الفتوة	Nominated for "Golden Bear" at Berlin Film Festival
1957	The Empty Pillow	Al-Wessada al-Khalia الوسادة الخالية	
1957	Sleepless	La Anam لا أنام	
1958	Criminal on Holiday	Mugrem fi Agaza مجرم في إجازة	
1958	The Barred Road	Al-Tarik al-Masdud الطريق المسدود	
1958	This is the Love	Haza Howa al-Hob هذا هو الحب	
1959	I Am Free	Ana Horra أنا حرة	
1959	Between Heaven and Earth	Bayn al-Samaa wa al-Ard بين السماء والأرض	
1960	Agony of Love	Lawet al-Hob لوعة الحب	
1960	The Girls and the Summer	Al-Banat wa al-Saif البنات والصيف	
1960	The Beginning and an End	Bidaya wa nihaya بداية ونهاية	Nominated for "Grand Prix" at the 2nd Moscow International Film Festival
1961	The Sun Will Never Set	La Tutf'e al-Shams لا تطفىء الشمس	
1962	Letter from an Unknown Woman	Ressala Min Emraa Maghoula رسالة من إمرأة مجهولة	
1963	No Time for Love	La Wakt lil Hob لا وقت للحب	
1966	Cairo 30	Al-Qahira 30 القاهرة 30	
1967	The Second Wife	Al-Zawga al-Thaniya الزوجة الثانية	
1968	Three Women	Thalath Nisa ثلاث نساء	
1969	Case 68	Al-Qadia 68 القضية 68	
1969	A Bit of Suffering	Shia min al Azab شيء من العذاب	
1971	Dawn of Islam	Fajr al-Islam فجر الإسلام	
1973	Malatily Bathhouse	Hammam al-Malatily حمام الملاطيلي	
1975	The Liar	Al-Kadab الكداب	
1976	First Year Love	Sana Oula Hob سنة أولى حب	
1977	She Fell in the Honey Sea	Sakatat fi Bahr al-Asal سقطت في بحر العسل	
1977	The Water-Carrier Is Dead	Al-Saqqa Mat السقا مات	Won "Best Film of the Year" at Egyptian Film Association
1978	The Criminal	Al-Mugrem المجرم	
1982	The Qadisiya	Al-Qadisiya القادسية	Nominated for "Golden Prize" at the 12th Moscow International Film Festival
1986	The Beginning	Al-Bidaya البداية	
1991	The Egyptian Citizen	Al-Moaten Masry المواطن مصري	Nominated for "Golden St. George" at the 17th Moscow International Film Festival
1994	Mr. Kaaf	Al-Sayed Kaaf السيد كاف	

== See also ==
- Kamal El Sheikh.
- Hassan Al-Imam.
- Mahmoud Zulfikar.
