= Soheir Ramzi =

Egyptian actress (born 1949)

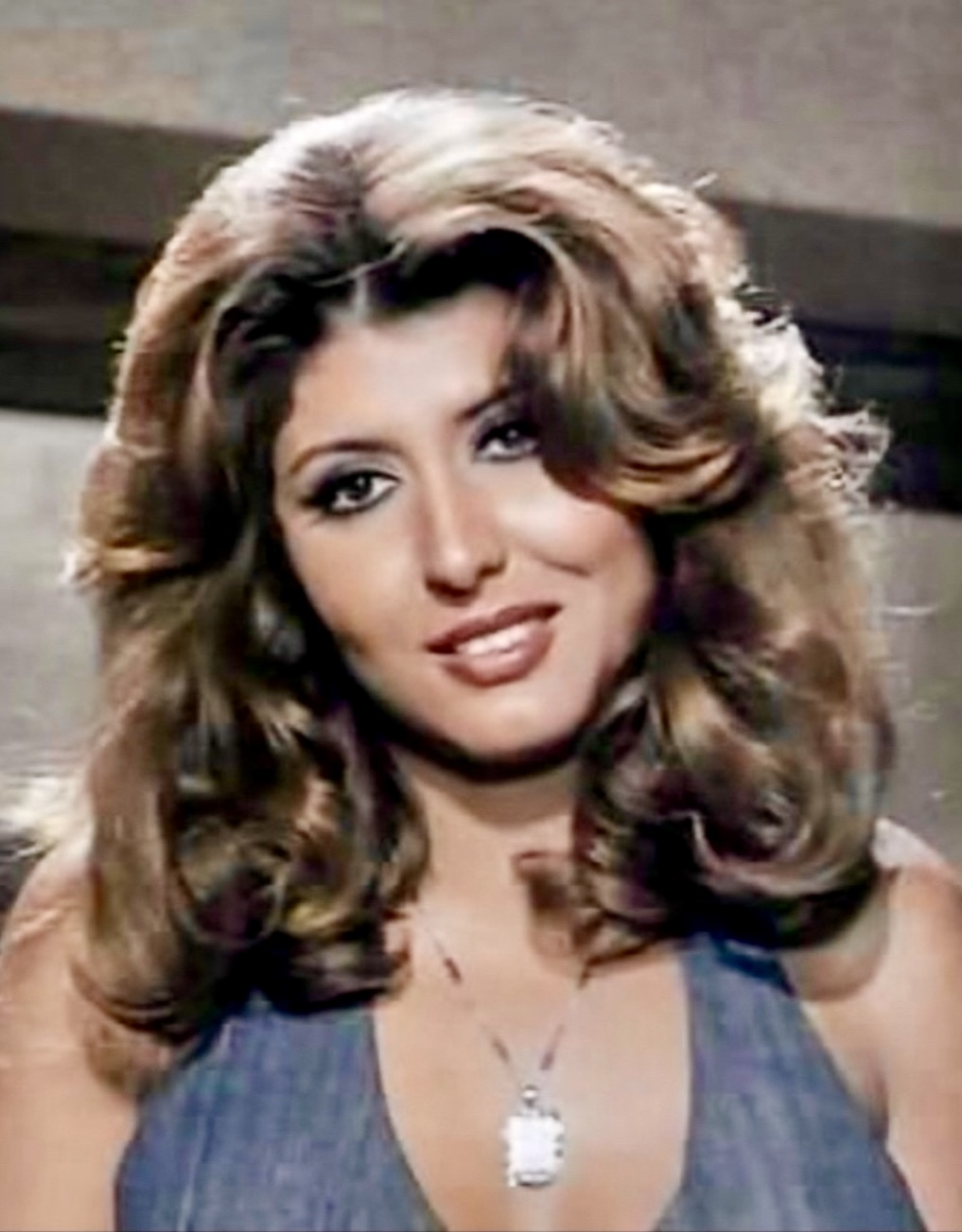
- Soheir Ramzi in the 1970s
- Born: Soheir Mohamed Abdelsalam Ramzi; 2 March 1949 (age 77); Port Said, Egypt
- Occupations: Actress, model, air hostess
- Years active: 1956–present
- Spouses: Ibrahim Khan; Prince Khalid bin Saud bin Abdulaziz Al Saud; Sayed Motwali; Mohamad Al Mula; Hilmi Bakr; Farouk Al-Fishawy; Alaa Sherbini; Mahmoud Kabil

Soheir Ramzi (Arabic: سهير رمزي; born 2 March 1949) is an Egyptian actress.

== Early life ==
Soheir Mohamed Abdelsalam Ramzi was born in Port Said. Her mother is Dorreya Ahmed, who is also an actress.

== Career ==
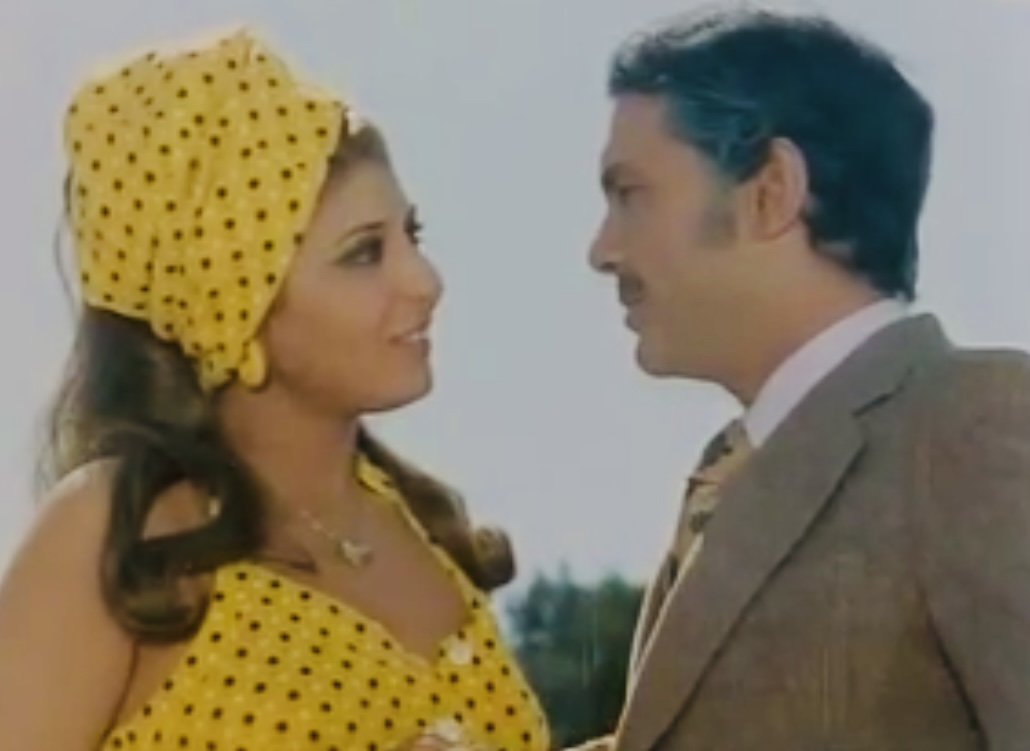
Soheir Ramzi with Salah Zulfikar in The Guilty (1975)

Ramzi's first appearance in the cinema when she was approximately six years old, through their appearance in the movie "Sahefet Sawaba" in 1956, but she decided to stop. She worked as an air hostess and then as a model.

She returned to cinema in 1969. Ramzi acted in Elnas elly Gwa, Pleasure and Suffering, The Guilty, A Girl Named Mahmoud, Chitchat on the Nile. The last role for her was in series Habeeb El roh in 2006, she wore a hijab and retired after that.

== Personal life ==
Ramzi married many times. Her first husband was the artist Ibrahim Khan, who lived with her for a year. She also married the Saudi Prince Khalid bin Saud bin Abdulaziz Al Saud, who was famous for his many marriages to actresses and remained with her for a year, then they separated. She married an Egyptian businessman, the owner of Al-Masry SC, Sayed Motwali, then Kuwaiti businessman Mohamad Al Mula with whom she lived for 5 months. She also married composer Hilmi Bakr, who was granted the privilege to guarantee his rights, but did not last long with him as the reason behind their divorce stuck to her work in the field of representation after a marriage that lasted for four years. She also married Farouk Al-Fishawy. Currently she is married to Egyptian businessman Alaa Sharbini.

== Filmography ==
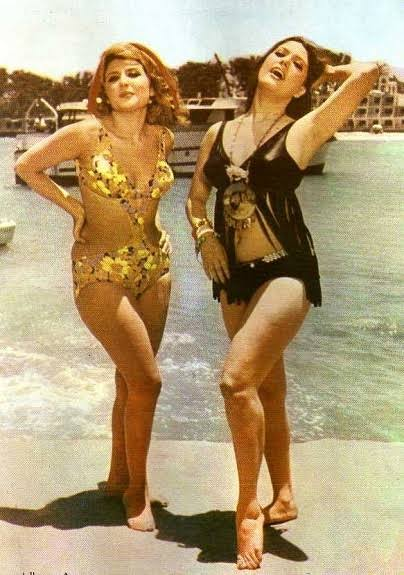
Ramzi (left) and Shams al-Baroudi in the 1970s

- 2006 Habeeb El roh (miniseries)
- 1993 A Citizen Under Investigation
- 1993 Aqwa Al Rejal (as Aliyah)
- 1991 Forbidden wife (as Suham)
- 1990 The Servant (as Soheir Ramzy)
- 1988 The Devil lines (as Najwa)
- 1987 El Badron (as Roqaya)
- 1987 El Kharteet (as Warda)
- 1986 Time of Love (as Badreya)
- 1984 The Lost plane (as Soheir Ramzy)
- 1984 The Guard dogs
- 1984 As Not to Fly the Smoke (as Saneya)
- 1982 The Trail (as Salwa)
- 1980 The girls what want (as Layla)
- 1980 Not Demons not Angels (as Kawthar)
- 1980 Man lost his mind (as Suzy)
- 1978 A Woman Is a Woman
- 1977 Where Will You Run? (as Sohier Ramzy)
- 1977 With my love and misses (as Nadiah)
- 1976 Rehlat Al-Ayyam (as Yasmeen)
- 1976 Al karawan have lips (as Soheir Ramzy)
- 1976 A World of Chirldren (as Nadia)
- 1976 Wa Belwaleden Ehsana (as Lola)
- 1975 A Girl Named Mahmoud (as Hamida/Mahmoud)
- 1975 Mamnou Fi Laylat El-Dokhla (as Mona)
- 1975 Al Mothneboon (as Sanaa Kamel)
- 1974 24 Saa'a Hob (as Mona)
- 1973 Al-mokhadeun (as Soheir Ramzy)
- 1972 The World in the Year 2000 (as Sohier Ramzy)
- 1971 Danger life (as Soheir Ramzy)
- 1971 Pleasure and Suffering (as Ilham)
- 1971 Chitchat on the Nile (as Layla)
- 1969 Al-Raqam Al-Maghool (miniseries)
- 1956 Sahefet Sawabeq
