= Gamal Salama =

Egyptian songwriter (1945–2021)

Gamal Salama (Arabic: جمال سلامة; 5 October 1945 – 7 May 2021) was an Egyptian songwriter and melodist. He studied at the Tchaikovsky Conservatory in Moscow in 1976 and returned to Egypt to write music for television.

== Career ==
Salama was born in Alexandria. In 1980, he composed music for Sabah for the film Layla baka fiha al-qamar, including his popular song Saat Saat collaborating with poet Abdel Rahman el-Abnudi. He then composed the song Ehki ya Scheherazade for Samira Said in 1981. Other artists he had composed for include singer Majida El Roumi and for poet Nizar Qabbani. Since he was experienced in composing patriotic music, he also wrote the song Shabab al-'ahd for the Tunisian singer Sofia Sadeq.

In the 1980s, he composed a great deal of music for Egyptian films and television series, including such favorites as the series; Al-Ansar, and Al-hub was ashia' ukhra and the films, such as I Want a Solution (1975), Karnak (1975), The Guilty (1976), Mouths and Rabbits (1977), Habibi da'iman (1980), I'm Not Lying But I'm Beautifying (1981), and The Black Tiger (1984). Active in the field of Islamic music as well, Salameh was noted for his unique style, which differed from traditional religious music in that it was less reliant on the daf. He worked with the religious singer Jasmin al-Khaim on the productions Muhammad rasool Allah (Muhammad the Prophet of Allah) starring Salah Zulfikar and Sa'a walid al-hada, among others.

== Death ==
On 7 May 2021, he died at Al Haram Hospital in Giza from complications related to COVID-19 at age 75.
