= The Other Man (1973 film) =

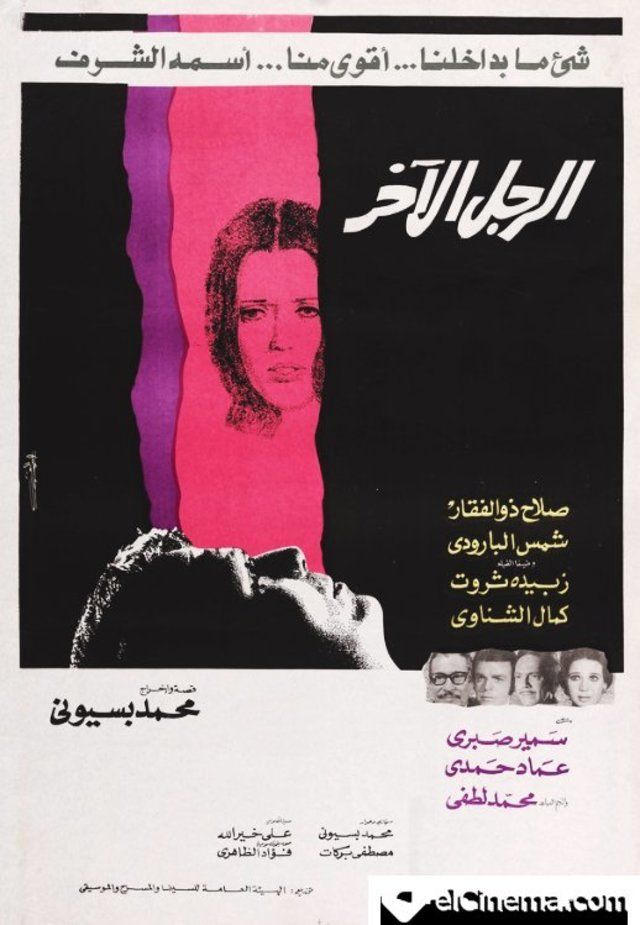
- Film poster
- Egyptian Arabic: الرجل الآخر
- Directed by: Mohammed Bassiouny
- Written by: Moustafa Barakat
- Produced by: Salah Zulfikar (Executive producer)
- Starring: Salah Zulfikar; Shams El Baroudi; Zubaida Tharwat
- Cinematography: Ali Khairallah
- Edited by: Said El Sheikh
- Music by: Fouad El Zahery
- Production companies: General Egyptian Corporation for Cinema and Television
- Distributed by: General Egyptian Corporation for Cinema and Television
- Release date: 1973
- Running time: 90 minutes
- Country: Egypt
- Language: Egyptian Arabic

The Other Man (Arabic: الرجل الآخر translit.: Al Rajul Al Akhar) is an Egyptian drama film released in 1973 and directed by Mohammed Bassiouny. It features an ensemble cast that includes Salah Zulfikar, Shams El Baroudi, Zubaida Tharwat, Kamal El-Shennawi and Emad Hamdy.

== Plot ==
The couple, Adel the journalist (Salah Zulfikar) and Salwa (Shams El Baroudi) are happily married and living a quiet and smooth life, looking for how to find happiness for the each other. One day, the kitchen gets broken, and the plumber comes to fix some pipes, and while the plumber (Ezzat Abdel-Gawad) is working, he finds himself in a state of lust. For this wife Salwa, he decides in a satanic moment to attack her and succeeds in that, and the balance becomes lost in the relationship of the spouses after a rift occurred in their relationship. It is a moment of weakness on the part of the plumber and her failure to resist him until she loses her strength and she has no fault in that to start a long line about the concept of honor and its importance and how to deal with it through peers and that doubt has no place, but that there are things that make it impossible for us to treat peers as a written model, but life sometimes Some situations, not all of them, are imposed on us as long as there is a conviction that the act took place by force and not with the consent of the other party.

== Main cast ==
- Salah Zulfikar as Adel Abdel Hamid
- Shams El Baroudi as Salwa
- Zubaida Tharwat as Anonymous lady
- Kamal El-Shennawi as Ismail Raafat
- Emad Hamdy as Shaker
- Samir Sabri as Ramzy
- Mohamed Lotfy as Journalist
- Ezzat Abdel Gawad as Plumber
- Fathia Shaheen
