= Hassan Youssef (actor) =

Egyptian actor and director (1939–2024)

- حسن يوسف
- Born: 14 April 1934; Sayyidah Zainab, Cairo, Kingdom of Egypt
- Died: 29 October 2024 (aged 90); Heliopolis, Cairo, Egypt
- Occupations: Actor and director
- Years active: 1959–2024
- Spouse(s): Lebleba (m. 1964; div. 1972) Shams al-Baroudi (m. 1972)
- Children: 4

Hasan Yousef (Arabic: حسن يوسف; 14 April 1934 – 29 October 2024) was an Egyptian actor and director.

== Career ==
Youssef performed in many films from the 1960s, and indicated that he made fifteen films with the famous Egyptian actress Soad Hosny, all of which were successful at the box office. He acted in several dramatic series in early 1980s such as Dalia the Egyptian. He also acted in the famously drama series Layaly El Helmeya in mid 1980s.

Youssef was amongst the five Egyptian cinema figures honoured at the 20th National Cinema Festival held in October 2016 in Egypt.

In January 2024, he announced his retirement from acting, following the drowning and death of his son in July 2023.

== Personal life ==
Youssef was married to actress Lebleba from 1964 to 1972. He later married former actress Shams al-Baroudi from 1972. They have four children, including a son, Omar H. Youssef.

On 11 July 2011, a group of thugs attacked Hassan on the road between Cairo and Alexandria. Hassan said that revolutionaries should help protect the road rather than demonstrate in Tahrir Square.

Youssef died on 29 October 2024, at the age of 90.

== Selected filmography ==
=== Films ===
No.	Year	Movie	Role
1	1961	Fi baitina rajul	
2	1966	Thalath Losoos	
3	1968	Hekayet thalass banat	
4	1971	Rehla Laziza	
5	1971	Khamsa share' al-habaib	
6	1973	Al-mokhadeun	

=== Television series ===
No.	Year	Movie	Role
1	1982	Dalia the Egyptian	
2	1985	Layaly El Helmeya	
