= Nour El-Sherif =

Egyptian actor

- نور الشريف
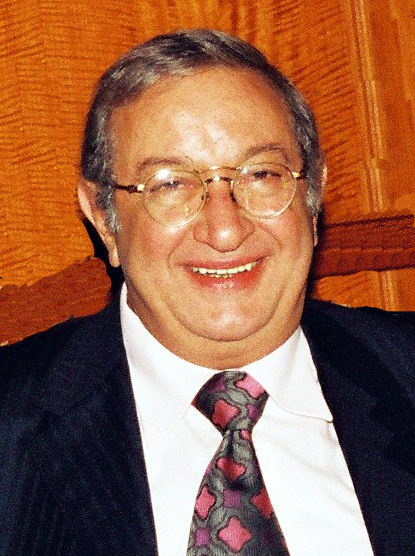
- El-Sherif in 2007
- Born: Mohamad Geber Mohamad Abd Allah; 28 April 1946; Cairo, Egypt
- Died: 11 August 2015 (aged 69); Cairo, Egypt
- Occupation: Actor
- Years active: 1965–2013
- Spouse(s): Poussi (m. 1972; div. 2006) and (2015)
- Children: 2

Nour El-Sherif (Arabic: نور الشريف; 28 April 1946 – 11 August 2015), born Mohamad Geber Mohamad Abd Allah (Arabic: محمد جابر محمد عبد الله) was a prominent Egyptian actor. He has 6 films in the Top 100 Egyptian films list.

Over the course of his 47-year career, El-Sherif starred in and contributed to some of the most acclaimed Arabic films and television productions. His film credits included Youssef Chahine’s *Hadouta Masreya* (*An Egyptian Story*) (1982) and *Al Massir* (*Destiny*) (1997), as well as the 2006 adaptation of Alaa Al-Aswany’s novel *A’amaret Yacoubian* (*The Yacoubian Building*), followed by *Masgoon Transit* (*Prisoner in Transit*) and *Leilat Al Baby Doll* (*Night of the Baby Doll*) in 2008.

El-Sherif was equally prominent on television, where his series attracted audiences throughout the Arab world. Among his most notable television roles were in *Haroon Al Rasheed*, *Omar Bin Abdel Aziz*, *A’aeilat Al Hag Metwally* (*The Family of Haj Metwally*), and *Lan A’aeesh Fe Gelbab Aby* (*I Will Not Live in My Father’s Shadow*).

== Biography ==
El-Sherif was born in the working-class neighbourhood of Sayeda Zainab in Cairo. El-Sherif was married to Poussi (1972–2006) and together they had two daughters, Sarah and Mai. He got divorced from Poussi in 2006 and they reunited in early 2015 during the difficulty of his illness. He also played soccer before choosing acting as a career. Nour El-Sherif is sometimes credited as Nour El Cherif, Nour El-Cherif or Nour Al-Sharif. He died on August 11, 2015, Cairo, Egypt.

== Career ==
After graduating from high school, Nour El-Sherif initially enrolled in the Faculty of Commerce before transferring to the Higher Institute for Theatrical Arts. He was introduced to Sa’ad Ardash, who recommended him for a small role in the play *Shaware’ al-Khalifa* (*The Streets of al-Khalifa*). Director Kamal E’id later cast him in *Romeo wa Juliet*. While rehearsing for the production, Nour met Adel Imam, who introduced him to director Hassan Imam. This led to his role in the film *Qasr al-Shawq* (*Fort of Passion*), for which he received his first special honor.

El-Sherif subsequently built an extensive career across film, television, and theater. His television credits included *Al-Qahira wa al-Nas* (*Cairo and its People*), *Adeeb* (*The Scholar*), *Lan A’eesh fee Galbab Abby* (*I Will Not Live in My Father’s Robes*), *Al Tha’lab* (*The Fox*), *U’mar bin A’bd Al A’zeez*, *Haroun al-Rasheed*, *Ibn Rushd*, *A’ailat al-Hajj Metwally* (*The Household of al-Hajj Metwally*), *Al A’ttar wa al-Bannat al-Sab’* (*The Perfumer and the Seven Girls*), and *Ragol al-Aqdar* (*Man of Destiny*). He also hosted the television program *Shouf Bakhtak* and appeared in stage productions including *Kont Feen Ya ‘Aly* (*Where Were You, Aly*) and *Al-Muttafael* (*The Optimist*).

During the 2000s and at the height of his career, El-Sherif continued working with prominent directors, including Marwan Hamed on *The Yacoubian Building* (2006), Sandra Nashaat on *Transit Prisoner* (2008), Adel Adib on *The Night of the Baby Doll* (2008), and Amir Ramses on *Cairo Time* (2015).

Nour made his directorial debut at Al-Hanajir Theatre with *Al-Kahin* (*The Priest*). He received numerous honors throughout his career, including recognition for *Qitt’a A’la al-Nar* and awards for films such as *Ya Rab Tawba*, *Da’ Al U’mr Ya Walady*, *Habeeby Daeiman*, *Al Karnak*, *Hadouta Massriyah* (*An Egyptian Tale*), *Al Taouss* (*The Peacock*), *Al A’ar* (*The Shame*), and *Ahl al-Qimma* (*Those of the Summit*). He also won an award at the New Delhi Film Festival for *Sawwaq al-Autobis* (*Bus Driver*) and the 1996 Cairo Cinema Festival Award for Best Actor for *Leyla Sakhina*. In 2001, he directed the film *Al-A’ashiqan* (*The Two Lovers*).

Cairo Time marked his final film appearance. Following the film, El-Sherif experienced an ongoing health crisis before his death on 11 August 2015.

El-Sherif’s contributions to Egyptian cinema continued to receive recognition toward the end of his career. In 2014, the Alexandria International Film Festival, with which he had been associated since its establishment, honored him with a Lifetime Achievement Award. The same year, he was also honored at the 11th edition of the Dubai International Film Festival.

His lasting influence was further recognized after his death. In 2016, the 9th edition of the National Theatre Festival was named in his honor. Five years later, in 2021, Google marked what would have been his 75th birthday with a Google Doodle celebrating his career and achievements.

== Death ==
Nour El-Sherif died from lung cancer in Cairo at the age of 69 in 2015 after a severe struggle with the disease.

== Acting style ==
Nour El-Sherif was known for an acting style characterized by realism, emotional depth, and versatility. Rather than relying on superficial performances, he carefully immersed himself in his characters, portraying their psychological and emotional complexities with sincerity and restraint. He frequently chose roles that explored social issues, family relationships, corruption, ambition, and moral conflict, using his performances to reflect the realities of Egyptian society.

His versatility allowed him to convincingly portray a wide range of characters, from historical and religious figures to self-made businessmen, fathers, working-class men, and politically powerful figures. In roles such as Abdel Ghafour El-Borai in *Lan A’ish Fi Gilbab Aby* and Yehia in *Al-Ragol Al-Akhar*, he demonstrated his ability to balance strength with vulnerability and authority with humanity. His performances were often praised for making his characters feel authentic and relatable, allowing audiences to connect with them on an emotional level.

El-Sherif also distinguished himself through his preference for meaningful, socially conscious projects. His approach combined entertainment with deeper commentary on society, while his collaborations with prominent writers and directors further strengthened the intellectual and emotional quality of his work. His ability to fully inhabit contrasting roles established him as one of the most versatile and respected actors in Egyptian television and cinema.

== Filmography ==
=== Selected works ===
Year	Title	Arabic Title	Notes
1967	Kasr El Shawk		
1968	Bint Min el Banat		
1970	Ashiaa la toshtra		
1971	Pleasure and Suffering	al-Mutåt wal-Âzab	
1971	My Wife and the Dog		
1973	Medinet al-Samt		
1974	In Summer We Must Love	Fel Saif Lazem Nihib	
1975	Leqa ma al-madi		
1975	Hello, I'm the Cat	Alo, ana al-ghetta	
1975	Karnak Cafe	Al-Karnak	
1975	Bloody Sunday	Youm El-Ahad El-Damy	
1976	La Waqt Lil Demoue		
1977	Ota Ala Nar		
1977	Sonya and the Madman		
1978	Journey Inside a Woman	Rehla Dakhel Emraa	
1978	Darbet Shams		
1978	The Time has gone my Son	Wa da al-omr ya waladi	
1978	The Last Confession	Al-Eeteraf al-Akhir	
1978	The Other Woman	Maraa Al-Okhra	
1980	Desire	Al-Raghba	
1981	Al-Akmar		
1981	People on the Top	Ahl El Qema	
1981	Al-Shaytan Yaez		
1982	The Bus Driver	Sawak Al-Utubis	
1982	An Egyptian Story	Hadduta Misrija	
1982	Bariq Ayneyk		
1982	The Peacock	Al-Tawous	
1984	Beit al-qadi		
1984	Streets of Fire	Imam	
1985	The Vagabonds	Al-Sa Alik	
1986	The Train	El-Ketaar	
1986	The Age of Wolves	Ahmed	
1987	Kaher el-zaman		
1989	Seraa al ahfad		
1989	Hellfire	Inar gahined	
1990	The Search of Sayed Marzouk	Al-Bahths an Al-Sayyid Marzuq	
1991	Nagi El-Ali		
1992	The Cry	Al-Sarkha	
1992	Ayoun Al Sakr		
1994	A Hot Night	Leila Sakhina	
1995	I Won't Live in My Father's Robes	Lan A3ish Fi Gelbab Abi	TV series
1997	Destiny	Massir	
1997	The Mushroom	Mostafa	
1998	Disappearance of Gaafar El-Masry	Ikhtefaa Gaafar El-Masry	
1999	The Other Man	El Ragol El Akhar	TV series
2001	Haj Metwali's Family		TV series
2002	El Attar we el saba3 banat		TV series
2004	Eish Ayamak		TV series
2005	Dam El Ghazal		
2006	The Yacoubian Building	Omaret Yakobean	
2008	Transit Prisoner	Masgoon Transit	
2008	The Baby Doll Night	Laylat El-Baby Doll	
2015	Cairo Time	Betawqeet El-Qahira	

== See also ==
- List of Egyptians
- List of Egyptian films of the 1980s
- List of Egyptian films of the 1990s
