= Raya and Sekina (play) =

Egyptian musical comedy play

- Original title: ريا وسكينة
- Based on: Raya and Sakina
- Characters: Shadia; Soher El Bably; Abdel Moneim Madbouly; Ahmad Bedair
- Original language: Egyptian Arabic
- Genre: musical; comedy

Premiere
- Date premiered: 1980

Raya Wa Sekina (Arabic: ريا وسكينة) is an Egyptian musical comedy play. The theatrical production commenced its run in 1980 at the Freedom Theater in Cairo, and then it was performed at Alexandria, Egypt in the summer of 1982, marking a significant departure for renowned artist Shadia, as it was her sole venture into the realm of theater. Despite her initial reservations, she took on a leading role in the play. Then, the play was performed for many years in the 1980s. The play is helmed by director Hussein Kamal, with the script penned by writer Bahgat Kamar, and It starred well-known Egyptian figures such as Shadia, Soher El Bably, Abdel Moneim Madbouly, Ahmed Bedier, Naeem Issa, and Amal Salem. Set against the backdrop of Cairo, the show offered a blend of humor and music, drawing audiences into its narrative. Among the cast, Saeed Saleh took on the role of a radio broadcaster. The play unfolds over the course of three acts, comprising a total of eight scenes. It unfolds over a duration of 3 hours and 50 minutes. Some critics said that the play is based on the 1953 film and true story of two Alexandrian serial killers, directed by Salah Abu Seif.

The play's narrative is anchored in the real-life tale of Raya and Sakina, yet it takes a comedic turn with the introduction of a humorous characters. The storyline centers on two impoverished sisters, Raya and Sakina, who resort to murdering their stepmother, Amouna, when she attempts to coerce them into returning to their homeland. Following Amouna's death, the sisters seize her gold and devise a plan to conceal the crime. Raya enters into marriage with Hasab Allah, while Sakina weds Abd El-'Al, an officer in the police department, in an effort to deflect suspicion. This scheme becomes a pattern for them, as they lure unsuspecting women into their home, subsequently killing them and pilfering their gold.

Shadia, renowned for her prowess in other artistic domains, had adamantly steered clear of theatrical ventures until director Hussein Kamal proposed an unconventional approach. Initially hesitant, fearing a potential dent in her established reputation should she falter on stage, Shadia reluctantly agreed to peruse the script. However, upon immersing herself in the narrative, she found herself drawn to the lead role, prompting her to take a daring leap into the world of theater. As the curtains rose on the play's debut in Alexandria in the summer of 1982, tensions flared between Shadia and fellow actor Hamdy Ahmed, leading to him ultimatum for his exclusion from the production. Her demand was met, and Ahmad Bedair assumed the role, ensuring the seamless continuation of the play's run for several years thereafter.

== Plot ==
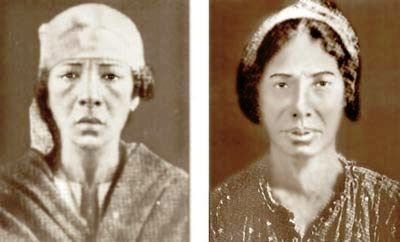
A picture of the real Raya and Sekina, who serve as the focal point of the play.

The play commences by introducing Abd El-'Al (Ahmad Bedair), a new officer in the urban area who hails from a distant village and struggles to adapt to city life. Shortly thereafter, Amouna, the stepmother of Raya (Shadia) and Sekina (Soher El Bably), enters the scene. The two sisters, grappling with poverty, resort to murdering Amouna after she pressures them to return to their homeland, seizing her gold in the process. To dispose of the body, Raya weds Hasaballah (Abdel Moneim Madbouly), who assists in burying Amouna in the basement.

Subsequently, the trio embarks on a spree of killings in the El Labban neighborhood, targeting women. As reports of missing women escalate, suspicions arise within the police force. To allay these suspicions, Sekina marries Abd El-'Al, and unbeknownst to him, the trio continue their gruesome activities without Abd El-'Al's knowledge. The missing women, often adorned with gold jewelry and carrying substantial amounts of money, are frequently last seen in the company of the sisters. Despite repeated questioning, Sekina manages to evade suspicion until the truth is ultimately revealed to Abd El-'Al and the authorities, leading to their execution.
