= Rayya and Sakina =

Egyptian duo serial killers

- رَيّا وسكينة
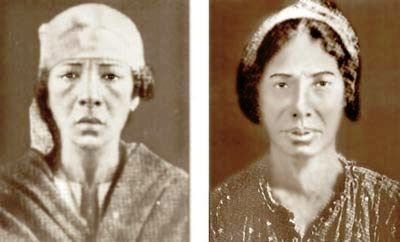
- Sakina (left) and Rayya (right).
- Died: 21 December 1921; Al-Hadra Prison, Alexandria, Egypt
- Cause of death: Execution by hanging
- Known for: First women to be executed by the modern state of Egypt
- Spouse(s): Hasb-Allah and Abd El-'Al
- Children: Badia
- Status: Executed
- Conviction: Serial killing
- Penalty: Death

Details
- Victims: 17 women
- Date: 20 December 1919 to 12 November 1920
- Location: Labban neighborhood of Alexandria
- Target: Women

Rayya and Sakina (Arabic: رَيّا وسكينة) were two Egyptian serial killers in early 20th-century Egypt. The two were sisters who were, alongside their husbands and two accomplices, convicted of killing 17 women in the Labban neighborhood of Alexandria from 1919 to 1920. The gang was apprehended in November 1920, tried in May 1921 and executed in December of the same year. Rayya and Sakina are known for being the first women executed in modern Egyptian history, and their case has inspired numerous depictions in the media.

== Background ==
Little is known about the two sisters' childhood. It is believed the older sister, Rayya, was born around 1875 in a village in upper Egypt, Sakina was born ten years later, around 1885. The family moved around few times until Sakina moved to Alexandria,1913 and her sister followed 3 years later.

Rayya's first husband died while she was pregnant with her first child, she was remarried to Hasb-Allah, her husband's younger brother, who likely married her out of duty to raise his nephew. Rayya had 6 children, but all except one died in their infancy. Hasb-Allah had a history of stealing and was imprisoned for 6 months around 1912. Rayya herself was also imprisoned for six months in 1916 for taking the fall for one of her husbands crimes.

Sakina's first husband divorced her 2 years into their marriage, after the death of her daughter, she started working in prostitution, which was accepted but heavily regulated in Egypt at the time. Few months later she fell sick, likely with an STD, and ended up staying for an extended time in the hospital where she met and fell in love with a nurse named "Ahmed Rajab" and the two escaped to Alexandria where they got married. Their arrival in the city was meant to be a new start for both of them, but the breakout of World War I caused a financial crisis and caused Ahmed to leave his wife and go find work with the allies war effort. Sakina had to go back to work in prostitution, this time unlicensed, and to stealing and selling rotten meat from British army barracks. After leaving prison Rayya and her family moved in with Sakina, and soon the entire family began running a secret brothel in their house.

By 1919, Sakina had divorced her husband and married her lover Abd El-'Al. The two sisters and their husbands were involved in running brothels and had two bouncers in their employee, Orabi Hassan and Abd El-Razik Yossef, Yossef was known to have an extensive criminal history. However, business had begun to dwindle after the war, due to the outbreak of revolution against the British. The gang attempted to hire teenage girls as sex workers and participate in trafficking some girls to make up for their lost revenue but that only lasted a while and put them in direct competition with some of their previous allies and contacts.

== Crimes ==
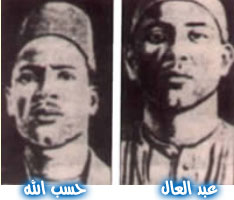
Hasb-Allah (Left) and Abd El-'Al (Right)

The six criminals Rayya and her husband Hasb-Allah, Sakina and her husband Abd El-'Al, Orabi Hassan and Abd El-Razik Yossef murdered 17 women Between 20 December 1919 and 12 November 1920. Majority of the victims were prostitutes who used to work in the brothel that was managed by Raya and Sakina. The women were usually targeted for wearing expensive jewelry. After the sisters lure a victim to one of four homes rented by the gang, they would offer her wine and liquor until she became inebriated. The four men would then attack the victim and constrain her movement. They would then hold down the victim and suffocate her by placing a wet cloth over her mouth. They would then steal her jewelry, money, and clothes. Afterwards, the men would remove the tiles of the floor, dig a hole, bury the corpse in it, and reset the tiles.

The two sisters sold the stolen jewelry to a local jeweler, Ali Hasan, and divided the money among the six criminals.

The gang was accused of the murder of 17 women according to their confessions, but only some of them were identified, they are:

1. Khadra bint Muhammad al-Lami (خضرة محمد اللامي) - Alleged to be the first victim, killed 21 December 1919, and buried in house No. 38 Ali Bey Elkebeer Street.
2. Nazla Abu al-Layl (نظلة أبو الليل) - A woman in her 20s, was reported missing by her mother on 15 January 1920 ten days after she went missing.
3. Aziza (عزيزة) — surname unknown, reportedly killed 3 weeks after the murder of Nazla, no missing report was filed for her.
4. Nabawiya (نبوية ) — surname unknown, reportedly killed on 9 February 1920, no missing report was filed for her.
5. Nabawiya bint Jum'a (نبوية بنت جمعة) - Killed on 13 February 1920, and reported missing by her husband on the same day.
6. Zanouba Musa (زنوبة موسى) - 28 year old woman, killed on 19 March 1920, she was reported missing by both her brother and husband. Her husband suspected she was kidnapped for the jewelry she was wearing and named Raya and Sakina as suspects in her disappearance.
7. Fatima (فاطمة) — surname unknown, likely killed between 19 March and 9 May 1920, no missing report was filed for her.
8. Anisa Radwan (أنيسة رضوان) - 25 year old divorced woman with a young daughter who she left with a friend before going missing on 1 July 1920. She was reported missing by her family.
9. Salimah al-Faqi (سليمة الفقي), a woman in her 60s who sold cooking and lighting gas to houses. She was killed on 18 August 1920, she was reported missing by her niece.
10. Nabawiya bint Ali (نبوية بنت علي), 45 year old woman killed the day after Salimah al-Faqi. Her husband, who initially thought she ran away, reported her missing 3 weeks after she went missing.
11. Zanouba bint Aliwa (زنوبة بنت عليوة)- 36 year old woman, killed on 3 October 1920 and reported missing the next day by her daughter, who named Raya and Sakina as the last people to see her.
12. Fatima 'Abd Rabbih (فاطمة عبد ربه) - 50 year old woman, killed on 20 October 1920 and reported missing 3 days later by her husband.
13. Firdous bint Fadlullah (فردوس بنت فضل الله) - Killed on 12 November 1920, only few days before the bodies were discovered, she was reported missing by her mother on 14 November.

The bodies of the dead women were discovered buried in 4 separate apartments:

- No. 5 Makoris Street, in Karmoz ally.
- No. 38 Ali Bey Elkebeer Street.
- No. 6 El Nejat Lane.
- No. 8 El Nehat Lane.

16 bodies were found in these four locations. Additionally, one woman's body, possibly that of Anisa Radwan, was found in an alley on 11 September 1920. According to later confessions of the gang, the body was first buried in No. 38 Ali Bey Elkebeer Street but moved to make place for another body, the coroner report placed the women's death 2 months before the body was discovered.

== Investigation and trial ==
In November 1920, the remains of a dead woman was found underneath a house in Alexandria while installing running water. This body is believed to be that of Nabawiya bint Ali who was killed 3 months earlier. This house had been previously rented by Sakina, which prompted the police's suspicion and all of Rayya and Sakina's houses were investigated. This resulted in the discoveries of seventeen total dead women. Many of these women were tied to the large amount of missing person reports that the police had been receiving. These dead bodies provided the only physical evidence regarding the murders in the Labban neighborhood. After investigation, it was found that Raya and Sakina had been renting a home beside El Labban police department, where the bodies were buried, at the time when the women and girls disappeared. Witnesses also came forward to say they saw many of the missing women with the two sisters before they went missing. Sakina's neighbor claimed she saw both Zanouba bint Aliwa, and Fatima 'Abd Rabbih with men she recognized as Hasb-Allah and Abd El-'Al in Sakina's apartment on the days they went missing. As the investigation continued, a seal owned by Hasb-Allah was found with the buried bodies and some items of the victims were found in the houses of Sakina and Orabi.

Rayya was the first to confess, though she tried to play down her own connection to the murder, her young daughter, Badi'a testified against the other members of the gang and also played down her mother's role. Sakina followed with her confession where she did take responsibility but attempted to protect her husband. The investigators struggled to piece together the conflicting account, but were able to build a case to prosecute 10 suspects.

Rayya, Sakina and their husbands were tried for murder alongside Orabi Hassan and Abd El-Razik Yossef. All six were convicted and were sentenced to death on 16 May 1921. Additionally, Ali Muhammad Hassan, a goldsmith who helped the gang sell the jewelry of the dead women, was sentenced to 5 years in prison. The 3 other suspects, were all acquitted for lack of evidence.

Rayya and Sakina became the first women to be executed by the modern state of Egypt, with their hangings taking place on 21 December 1921.

== In the media ==
=== Theatre ===
- Rayya and Sakina, a 1920s play, co-written, co-directed and starring Naguib el-Rihani.
- The Secret of the Serial killer Raya, a 1955 play starring Negma Ibrahim (who previously played the same role on film) directed by Abbas Younis.
- Raya and Sakina, a 1985 play that starred Sohair El Babli, Shadia, Abdel Moneim Madbouly and Ahmed Bedier.

=== Film ===
- Rayya and Sakina a 1953 film starring Negma Ibrahim, Zouzou Hamdy El-Hakim, Farid Shawki, Anwar Wagdi, Shoukry Sarhan, Samira Ahmed and Berlanti Abdel Hamid, and was directed by Salah Abu Seif.
- Ismail Yasin meets Raya and Sakina a 1955 film starring Ismail Yasin, Negma, Zouzou Hamdy El-Hakim, Abdel Fattah Qasri and Reyad El Kasabgy, and was directed by Hamada Abdel Wahab.
- Raya wa Sakina' a film from 1982 starring Sohair El Babli, Shadia, Abdel Moneim Madbouly and Ahmed Bedier.
- Rayya and Sakina' a 1983 film that starred Sharihan, Younis Shalabi and Hassan Abdeen.

=== TV ===
- Rayya and Sakina', a television series that aired in 2005 which stars Abla Kamel, Somaya El Khashab, Sami Al Adel, Ahmed Maher, Salah Abdallah, and Ryad El Khoury, and was directed by Gamal Abdel Hamid.
- Raya and Sakina, a 2008 television talk show presented by Hala Fakher and Ghada Abdel Razek and interviewing many celebrities.

== See also ==
- List of serial killers by country
- List of serial killers by number of victims
