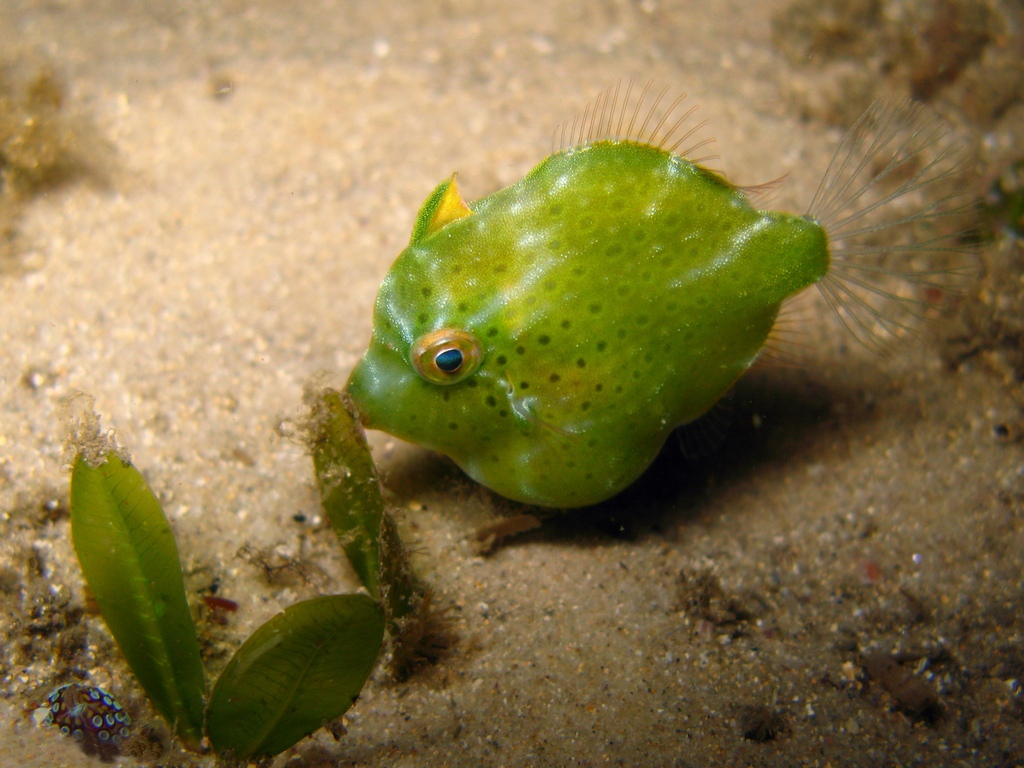
- Brachaluteres jacksonianus

Scientific classification
- Kingdom: Animalia
- Phylum: Chordata
- Class: Actinopterygii
- Order: Tetraodontiformes
- Family: Monacanthidae
- Genus: Brachaluteres; Bleeker, 1865

= Brachaluteres =

Genus of fishes

Brachaluteres is a genus of filefish of the family Monacanthidae. The genus name "Brachaluteres" is derived from the Greek brachys (meaning "short") and the Latin luteus (meaning "yellow"). Fish of the genus occur in the tropical waters of the Western Pacific Ocean.

== Species ==
There are currently 4 recognized species in this genus:

- Brachaluteres fahaqa E. Clark & Gohar, 1953
- Brachaluteres jacksonianus Quoy & Gaimard, 1824 (Pygmy leatherjacket)
- Brachaluteres taylori Woods, 1966 (Taylor's inflator filefish)
- Brachaluteres ulvarum D. S. Jordan & Fowler, 1902 (Japanese inflator filefish)
