= Hamed Gohar =

Egyptian TV presenter (1907–1992)

Hamed Abdel Fattah Gohar
- حامد عبد الفتاح جوهر
- Born: 15 November 1907; Cairo, Egypt
- Died: 17 June 1992 (aged 84); Alexandria, Egypt
- Occupation(s): Oceanographer, scientist and TV presenter
- Known for: Sea World

Hamed Abdel Fattah Goher (15 November 1907 – 17 June 1992) (Arabic: حامد عبد الفتاح جوهر) was an Egyptian oceanographer, scientist and TV presenter. He appeared for over 18 years in his program The World of the Seas.

He was unmarried and dedicated his life to the sea. Gohar initiated the first full-scale research in ocean studies in Egypt and the Arab countries. In 1931, he began research on Xenia, or soft corals of the Red Sea, finalized in 1939. In 1934, he published a study in the British journal, Nature, on "The Partnership between Fish and Anemone".

Gohar's eight-year research on the soft corals in Hurghada earned him a D.Sc. from Cambridge - considered the highest recognition open to unsupervised research.

== Early life and education ==
Hamed Abdel Fattah Gohar was born in Cairo on November 15, 1907. He received his primary education at the Islamic Charitable Society School, and his secondary education at the Royal Secondary School, from which he obtained his baccalaureate degree in 1925 (the year the Egyptian University was established).

Gohar first joined the Faculty of Medicine in Cairo University, and despite his excellent success in the preparatory year, he later chose to transfer to the Faculty of Sciences. From there, he obtained a Bachelor of Science with first class honors, and was appointed as a teaching assistant in the Department of Animal Sciences at the college.

In 1931, two years after his graduation, he submitted his first thesis to obtain a master's degree, the subject of which was "Micro anatomy and histology of the endocrine glands in the rabbit".

After that, Gohar moved to work at the Marine Biology Station in Hurghada, and continued scientific research in the creatures of the Red Sea, until he obtained a doctorate in science in this branch of knowledge, and perhaps - as Dr. Abdel Halim Montaser says - the first to obtain it in Egypt.

== Scientific contributions in Egypt and the Arab world ==
- Six decades ago, Hamed Gohar began the first extensive research study of marine studies in Egypt and the Arab world.
- Hamed Gohar took over the management of the marine life station in Hurghada since its inception and for forty years.
- He established a marine museum that includes collections of Red Sea animals and plants, as well as a library that includes most of the basic references for the study of the Red Sea.
- He established the Institute of Aquarium at Ataka in Suez, and set up another museum for the life of the Red Sea.
- He worked as an advisor for science and technology at the Arab League in 1970.
- Member of the Academy of the Arabic Language in Cairo in 1973.
- He participated in the Arabic scientific dictionaries issued by the Arabic Language Academy, most notably the Biology Dictionary in Biology and Agriculture, which took 8 years to prepare from 1976 to 1984, and some of the leading Arab scientists participated in it.

== His international contributions ==
- He was an advisor to the Secretary-General of the United Nations to organize the first International Conference on the Law of the Sea in Geneva in 1958.
- In 1959, the International Atomic Energy Agency chose him to head the Committee for the Disposal of Nuclear Waste in the Deep Sea.
- He was a member of the Advisory Committee of the Food and Agriculture Organization (FAO) of the United Nations.

== Membership of specialized scientific societies ==
- The first president of the Zoological Society of the Arab Republic of Egypt when it was established in 1958.
- President of the Egyptian Society of Marine Sciences
- Fellow of the Egyptian Academy of Sciences
- Vice President of the Egyptian Society for Scientific Culture
- Fellow of the International Zoological Academy of India
- Fellow of the International Academy of Fisheries Sciences in Rome
- Member of the Supreme Council for Fisheries since its inception

== The World of the Seas ==
Gohar had a famous weekly television program broadcast on Friday called The World of the Seas, and its broadcast lasted for 18 years, where he used to show films about various marine creatures and he commented explaining the picture and introducing the different factions, their habits and qualities. those years. He always started his program with the phrase “Good evening,” and he uttered this phrase in a strong and distinctive way. The late artist Saeed Saleh imitated him in the play Al Ayal Kibrit (The Kids Have Grown Up) during his phone call to his father, Ramadan Al-Sukari, to inform him of the kidnapping of his son Atef.

== Honours and awards ==
- State Appreciation Award in Science 1974.
- The Order of Merit, first class, 1975.
- Google Doodle, 2022.
