= Lime (color) =

Shade of yellow-green

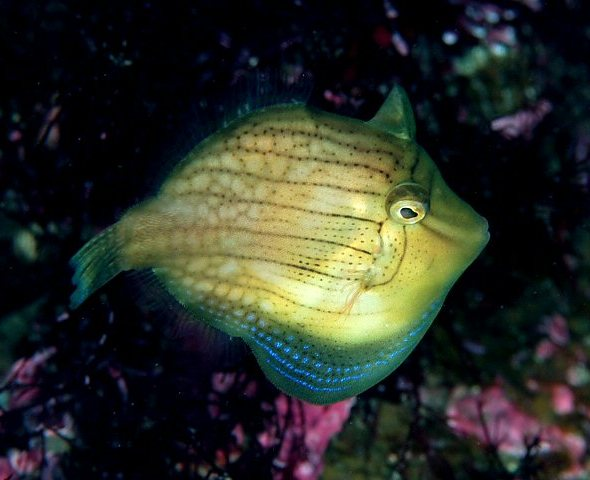
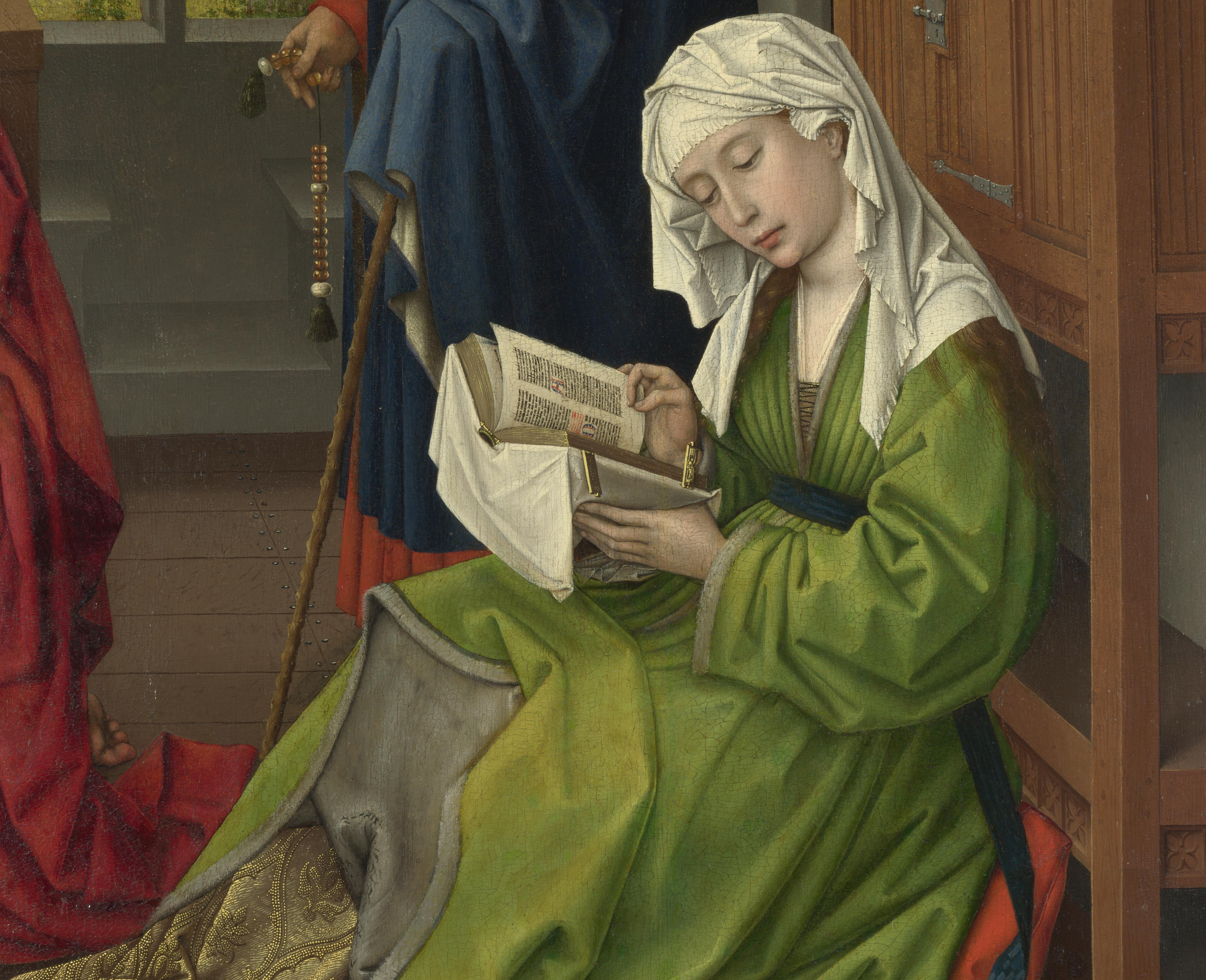
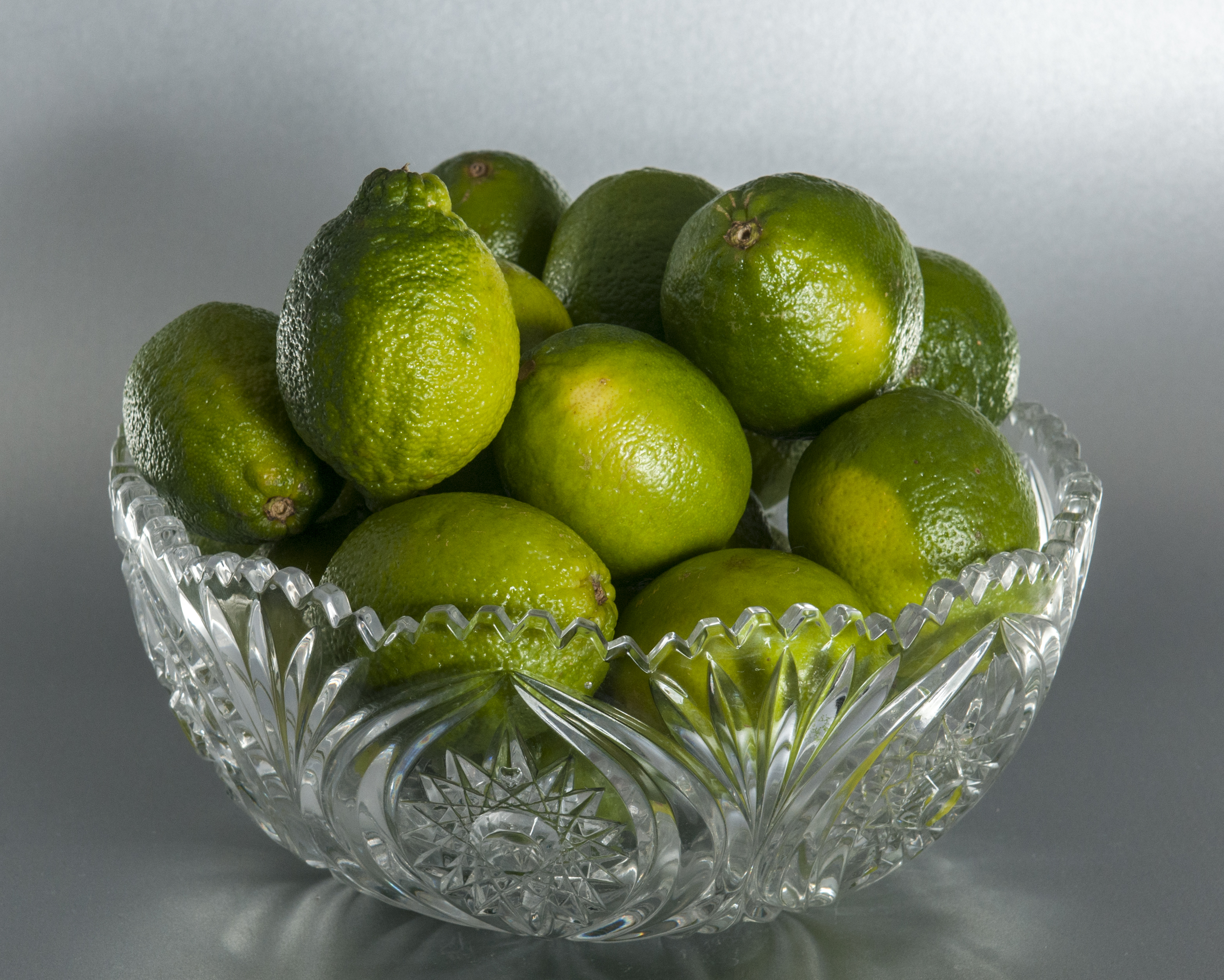
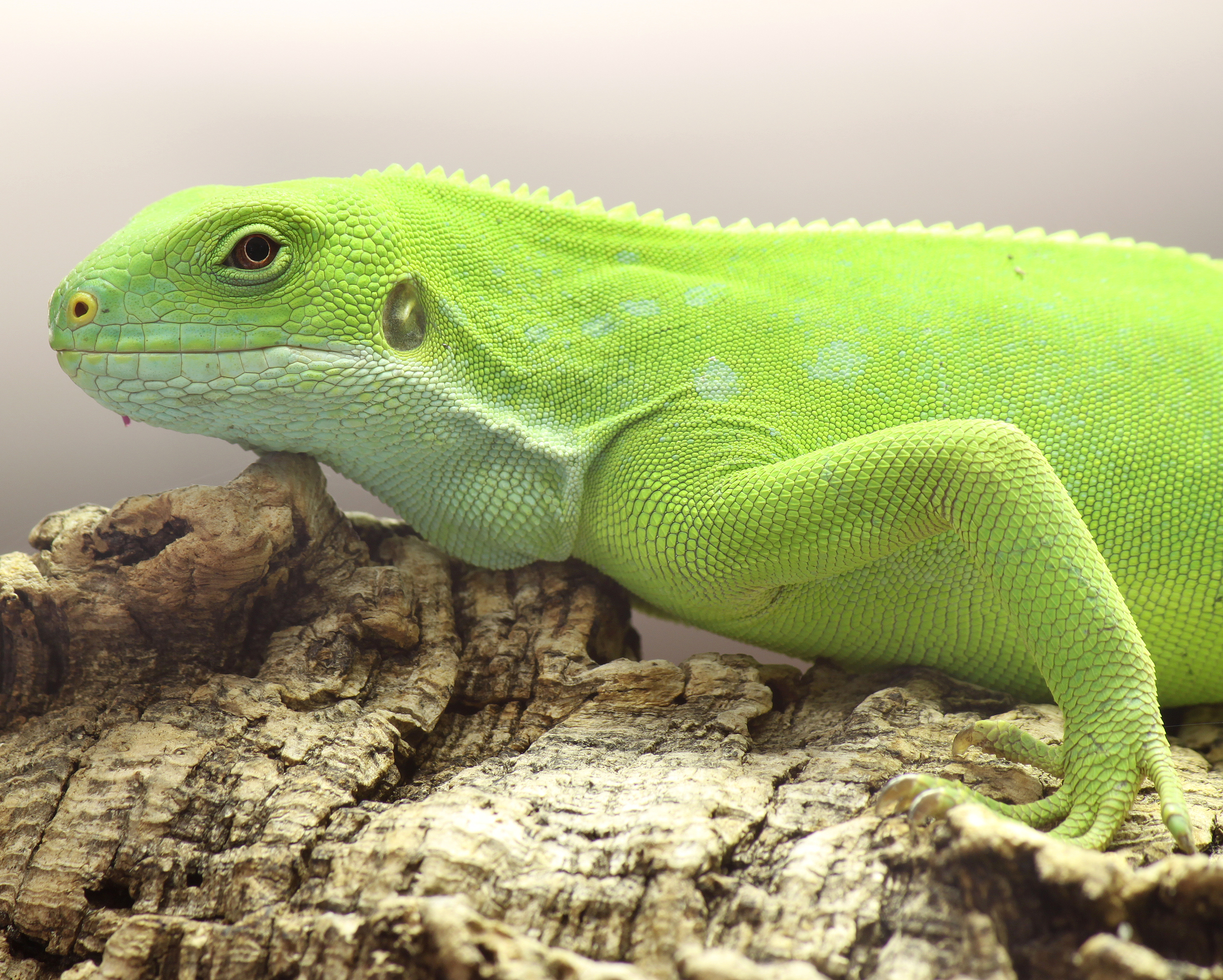
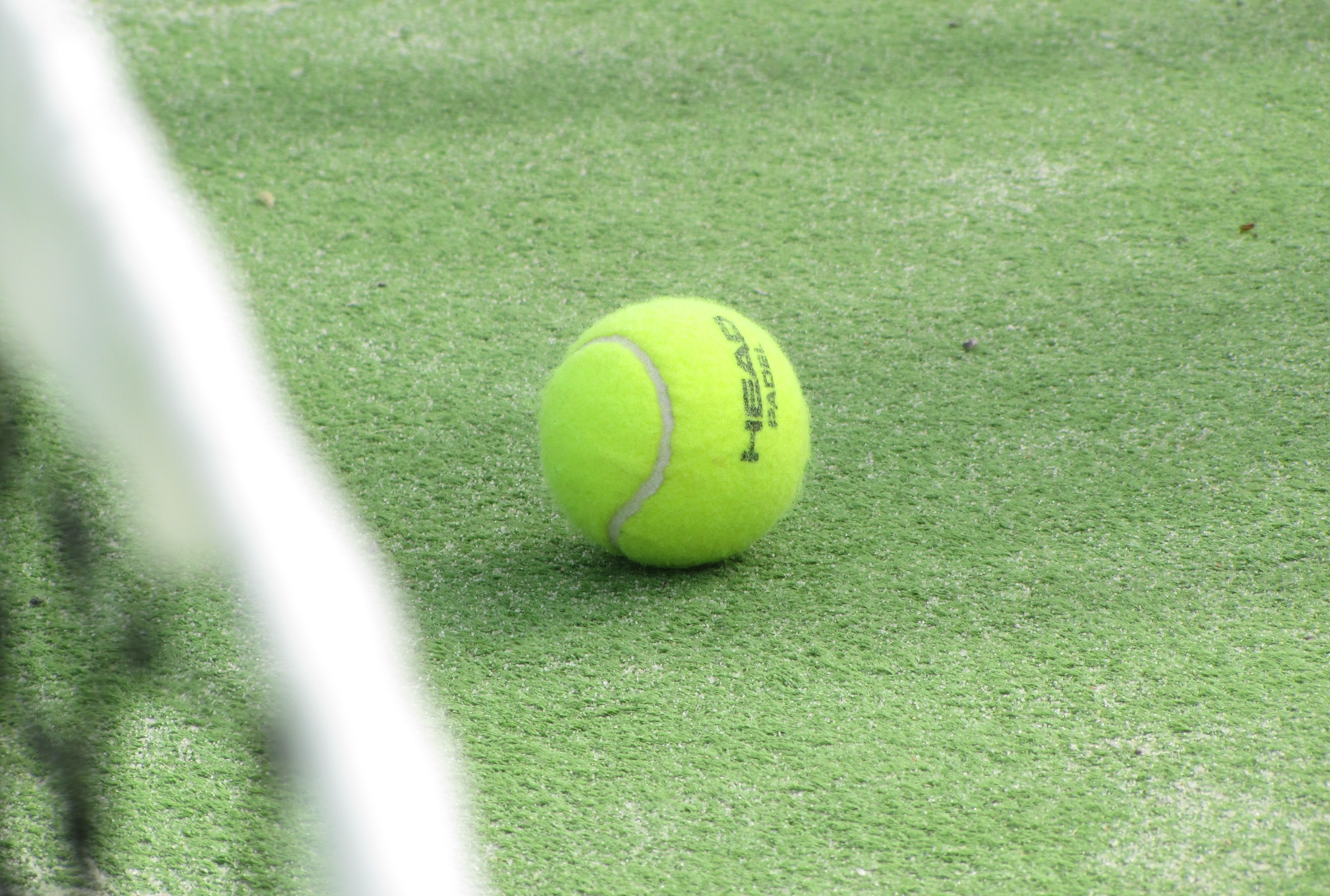
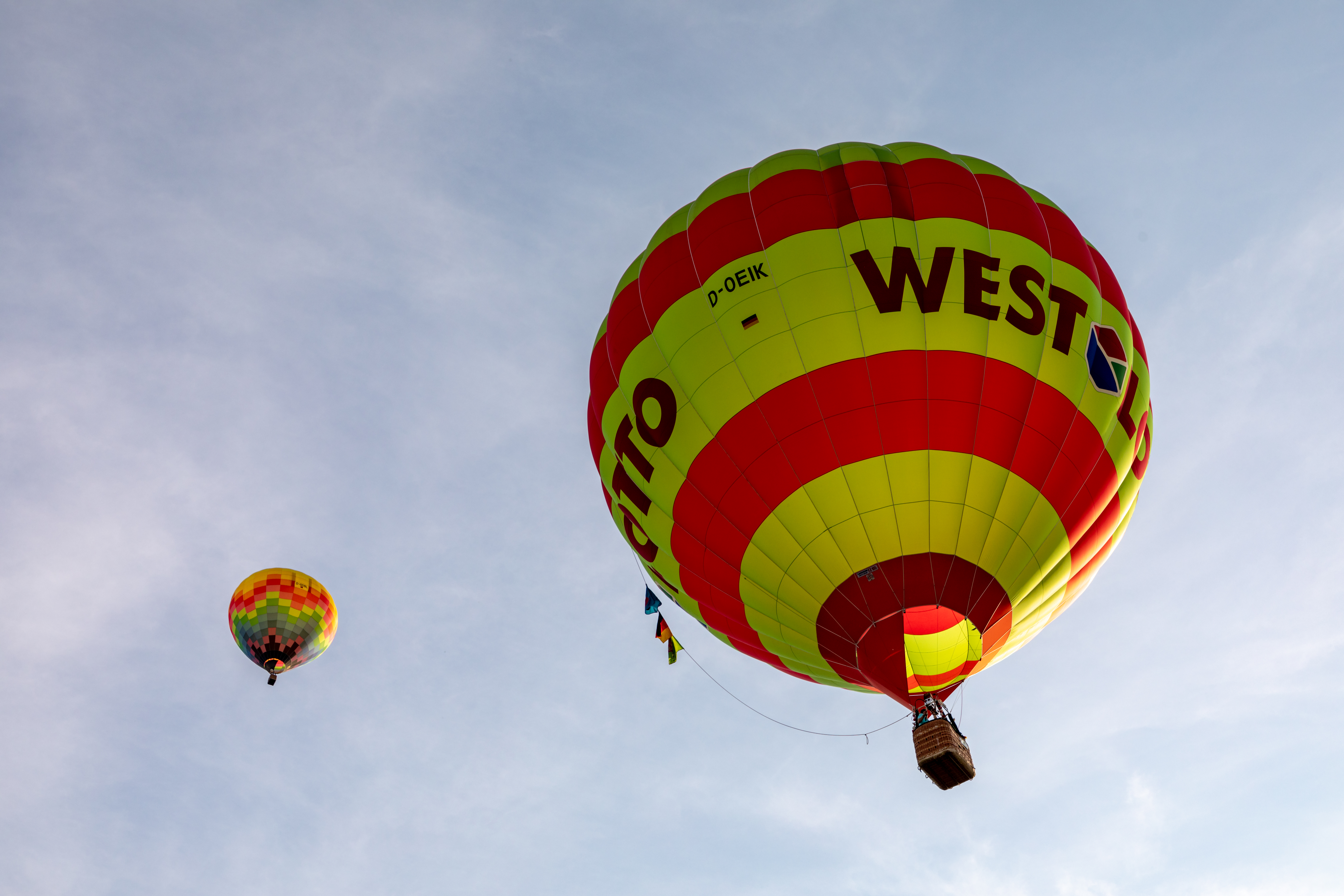
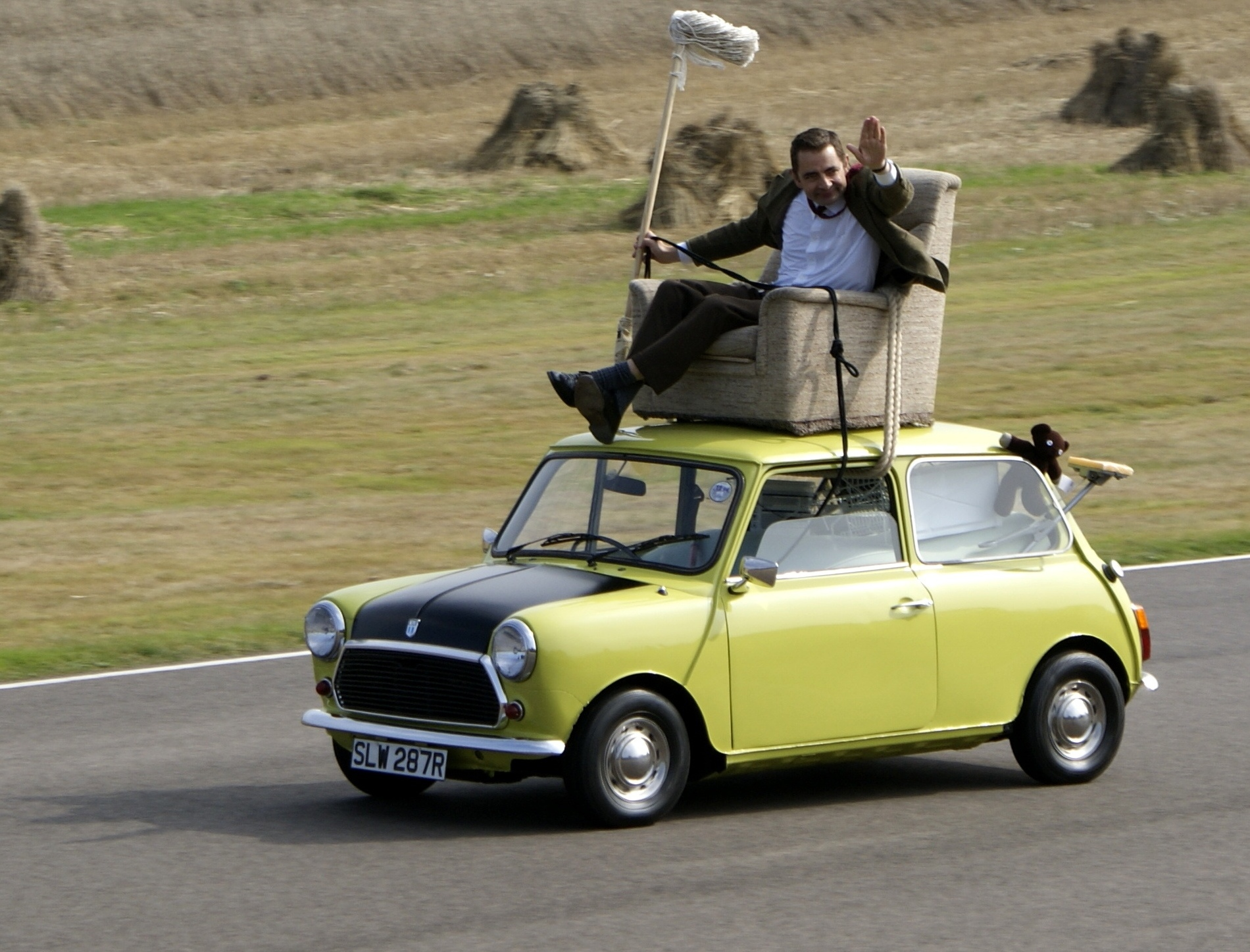
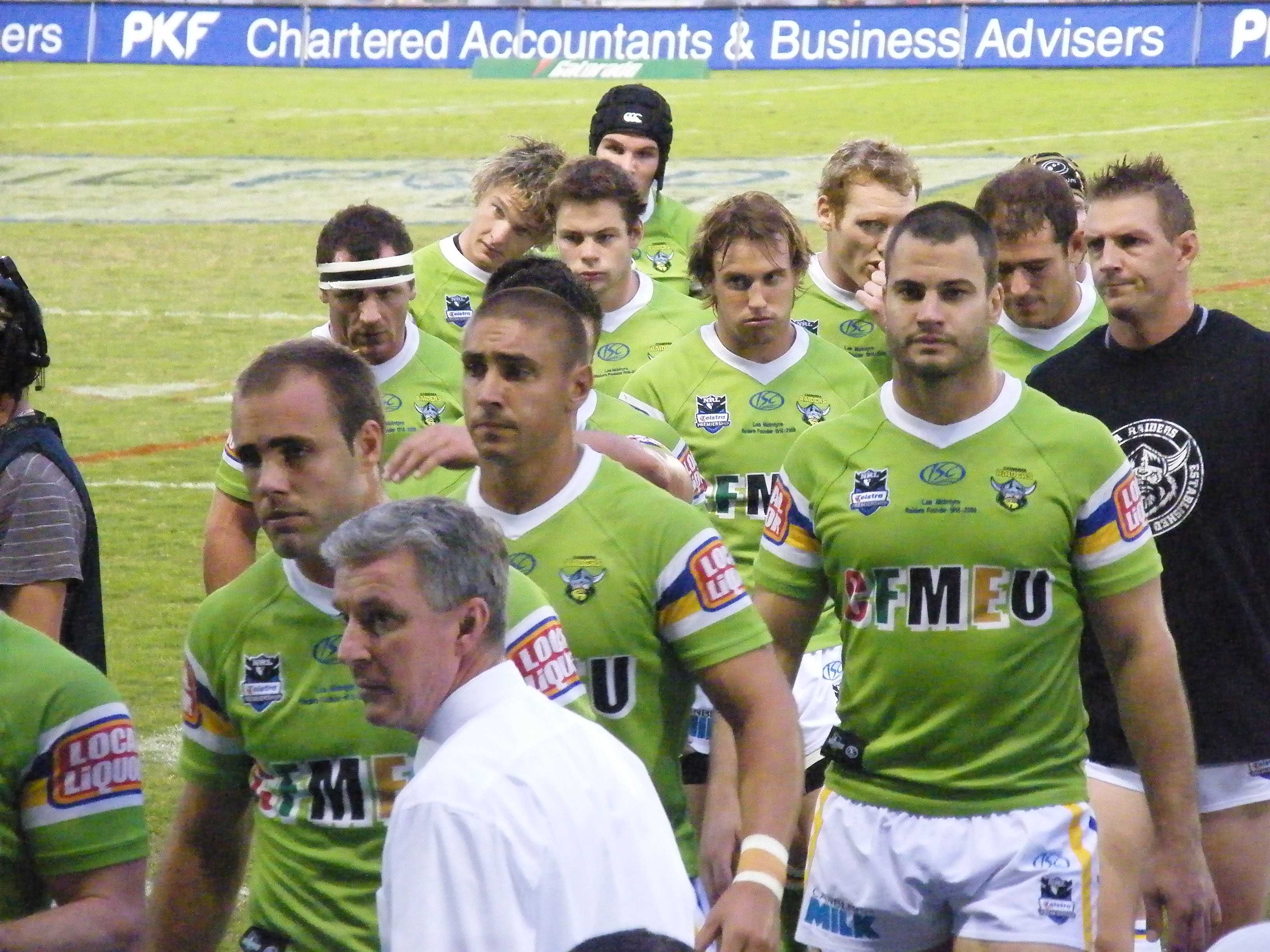
- Clockwise, from top left: Brachaluteres ulvarum; The Magdalen Reading by Rogier van der Weyden; Brachylophus fasciatus; Hot air balloons at the 49th Montgolfiade in Münster; Canberra Raiders team in 2009; Rowan Atkinson on a Mini at Goodwood Circuit; Tennis ball; Bowl of limes.

Color coordinates
- Hex triplet: #BFFF00
- sRGB^{B} (r, g, b): (191, 255, 0)
- HSV (h, s, v): (75°, 100%, 100%)
- CIELCh_{uv} (L, C, h): (93, 111, 107°)
- Source: RGB color system
- ISCC–NBS descriptor: Vivid yellow green
- B: Normalized to [0–255] (byte); H: Normalized to [0–100] (hundred)

Lime is a color that is a shade of yellow-green, so named because it is a representation of the color of the citrus fruit lime. It is the color that is in between the web color chartreuse and yellow on the color wheel. Alternate names for this color included yellow-green, lemon-lime, lime green, or bitter lime.

The first recorded use of lime green as a color name in English was in 1890.

Lime (color hex code #C0FF00) is a pure spectral color at approximately 564 nanometers on the visible spectrum when plotted on the CIE chromaticity diagram.

== Usage ==
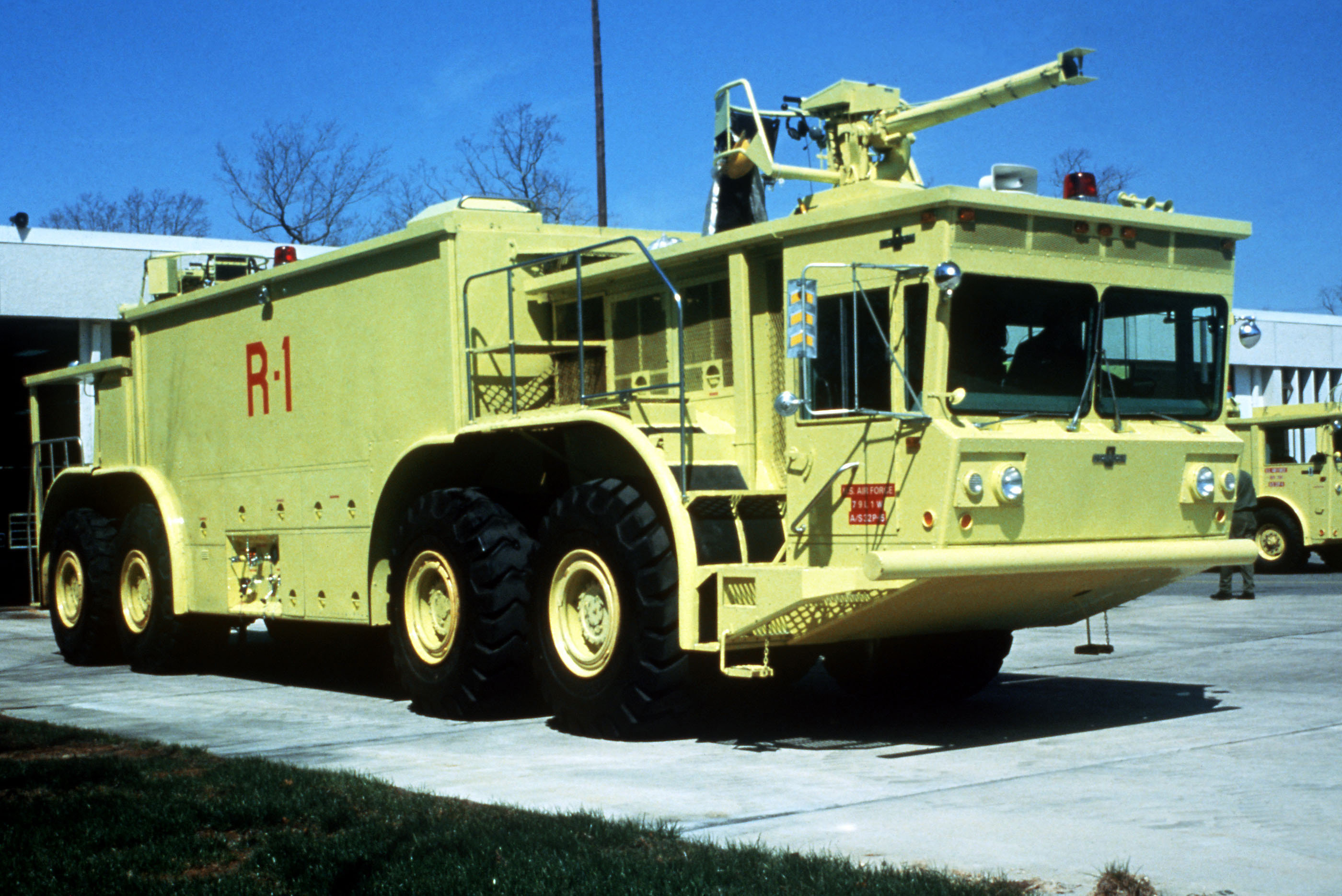
A lime yellow Oshkosh P-15 fire truck

During the 2000s, lime green was a very popular aesthetic, particularly with products, throughout the entirety of the decade and eventually saw a resurgence during the early 2020s. Famous examples include Song Airlines, Crocs shoes, and the Seattle Seahawks.

Some fire engines in the United States are lime yellow rather than red due to safety and ergonomics reasons. A 2009 study by the U.S. Fire Administration concluded that fluorescent colors, including yellow-green and orange, are easiest to spot in daylight.

The National Rugby League team Canberra Raiders uses lime green as one of its main colors, as does the National Football League's Seattle Seahawks, which utilizes a color officially named Action Green, which strongly resembles lime green.

== Variations ==
=== Key lime ===
Key lime

Color coordinates
- Hex triplet: #E8F48C
- sRGB^{B} (r, g, b): (232, 244, 140)
- HSV (h, s, v): (67°, 43%, 96%)
- CIELCh_{uv} (L, C, h): (93, 68, 92°)
- Source: Crayola Key Lime Pearl (Pearl Brites)
- B: Normalized to [0–255] (byte)

Key lime is a light lime color that is named after a Crayola Pearl Brites crayon.

=== Lemon-lime ===
Lemon-lime

Color coordinates
- Hex triplet: #E3FF00
- sRGB^{B} (r, g, b): (227, 255, 0)
- HSV (h, s, v): (67°, 100%, 100%)
- CIELCh_{uv} (L, C, h): (95, 107, 96°)
- Source: Sprite
- ISCC–NBS descriptor: Vivid yellow green
- B: Normalized to [0–255] (byte)

Lemon-lime is a fluorescent chartreuse color that is named after carbonated soft drinks such as Sprite, 7 Up, and Sierra Mist. The red value to this neon color is almost to yellow.

=== Arctic lime ===
Arctic lime

Color coordinates
- Hex triplet: #D0FF14
- sRGB^{B} (r, g, b): (208, 255, 20)
- HSV (h, s, v): (72°, 92%, 100%)
- CIELCh_{uv} (L, C, h): (94, 108, 102°)
- Source: Crayola
- ISCC–NBS descriptor: Vivid yellow green
- B: Normalized to [0–255] (byte)

The color Arctic lime is close to electric lime, and was named in 2009. This is one of the colors in Crayola's eXtreme colors ultra-bright colored pencils.

=== Peridot ===
Peridot
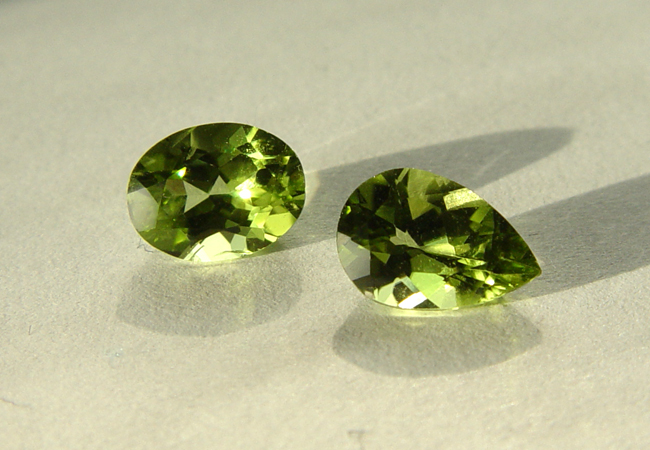
- Peridot gemstones

Color coordinates
- Hex triplet: #E6E200
- sRGB^{B} (r, g, b): (230, 226, 0)
- HSV (h, s, v): (59°, 100%, 90%)
- CIELCh_{uv} (L, C, h): (88, 96, 84°)
- Source: Encycolorpedia
- ISCC–NBS descriptor: Vivid greenish yellow
- B: Normalized to [0–255] (byte)

The color peridot is a shade of lime with lemon undertones, which represents the color of the peridot gemstone. Peridot is the birthstone for those born in August.

=== Volt ===
Volt
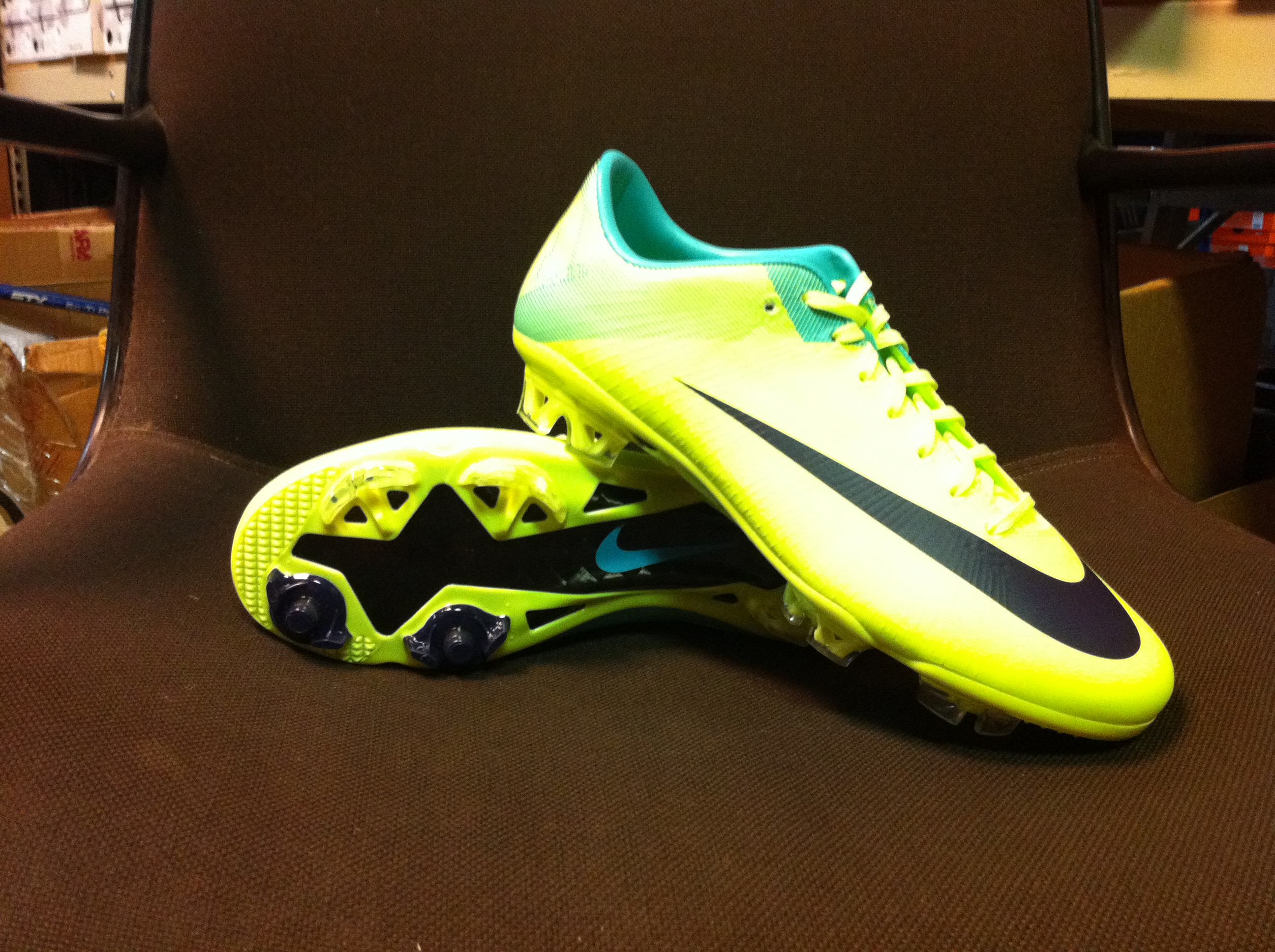
- Nike sneakers, mostly colored volt

Color coordinates
- Hex triplet: #CEFF00
- sRGB^{B} (r, g, b): (206, 255, 0)
- HSV (h, s, v): (72°, 100%, 100%)
- CIELCh_{uv} (L, C, h): (94, 109, 102°)
- Source: Complex
- ISCC–NBS descriptor: Vivid yellow green
- B: Normalized to [0–255] (byte)

The color Volt is used by Nike in several of their athletic products, most notably their Air Max 90 Hyperfuse sneakers, which were introduced in 2011. This color is similar to electric lime.

=== Electric lime ===
Electric lime

Color coordinates
- Hex triplet: #CCFF00
- sRGB^{B} (r, g, b): (204, 255, 0)
- HSV (h, s, v): (72°, 100%, 100%)
- CIELCh_{uv} (L, C, h): (94, 110, 103°)
- Source: Crayola
- ISCC–NBS descriptor: Vivid yellow green
- B: Normalized to [0–255] (byte)

Electric lime is a Crayola color created in 1990. This tint of lime is popular in psychedelic art.

=== French lime ===
French Lime

Color coordinates
- Hex triplet: #9EFD38
- sRGB^{B} (r, g, b): (158, 253, 56)
- HSV (h, s, v): (89°, 78%, 99%)
- CIELCh_{uv} (L, C, h): (91, 111, 115°)
- Source: Pourpre.com
- ISCC–NBS descriptor: Vivid yellow green
- B: Normalized to [0–255] (byte)

The color French lime is the shade of lime called "lime" in the Pourpre.com color list, a color list widely popular in France.

=== Web color "lime" (X11 Green) ===
Lime (HTML/CSS); Green (X11)

Color coordinates
- Hex triplet: #00FF00
- sRGB^{B} (r, g, b): (0, 255, 0)
- HSV (h, s, v): (120°, 100%, 100%)
- CIELCh_{uv} (L, C, h): (88, 136, 128°)
- Source: HTML/CSS
- ISCC–NBS descriptor: Vivid yellowish green
- B: Normalized to [0–255] (byte)

The web color named "lime", in the CSS color scheme maintained by the World Wide Web Consortium (W3C), has the identical normalized color coordinates as the color green, as found in X11 color names formulized over 1985–1989. The web color lime / X11 color green match the green primary color of the RGB color model.

The W3C web color named green is darker than the color named green in X11, using the HTML color code #008000 as compared to the color code #00FF00 in X11. This lime versus green issue is one of the very few clashes between web and X11 colors in the CSS color scheme.

=== Lime green ===
Lime green

Color coordinates
- Hex triplet: #32CD32
- sRGB^{B} (r, g, b): (50, 205, 50)
- HSV (h, s, v): (120°, 76%, 80%)
- CIELCh_{uv} (L, C, h): (73, 103, 128°)
- Source: X11
- ISCC–NBS descriptor: Vivid yellowish green
- B: Normalized to [0–255] (byte)

Lime green is a vivid yellowish green web color.

=== Bright lime ===
Bright lime

Color coordinates
- Hex triplet: #72FE00
- sRGB^{B} (r, g, b): (114, 254, 0)
- HSV (h, s, v): (93°, 100%, 100%)
- CIELCh_{uv} (L, C, h): (89, 125, 121°)
- Source: color-name.com
- B: Normalized to [0–255] (byte)

Bright lime is a luminous vivid chartreuse green web color.

== See also ==
- Lists of colors
