= Omar Al-Hariri =

Egyptian actor (1926–2011)

Omar El-Hariri
- Born: February 12, 1926; Abdeen, Cairo, Egypt
- Died: October 16, 2011 (aged 85); Cairo, Egypt
- Education: Higher Institute of Cinema
- Occupation: Actor
- Years active: 1937–2011
- Notable work: The Empty Pillow (1957); Sukkar hanem (1960); River of Love (1960); Saladin the Victorious (1963); Shahed Ma Shafsh Haga (1976); Lion of the Desert (1981, Arabic dub of Mussolini); Al-Wad Sayed Al-Shaghal (1985)

Omar El-Hariri (Arabic: عمر الحريري, his full birth name Omar Mohamed Saleh Abdel Hadi El-Hariri; 12 February 1926 – 16 October 2011) was an Egyptian actor whose career in cinema, television and theatre spanned more than seven decades. He is considered to be one of the most prolific supporting and character actors of Egyptian cinema's "golden age" and the decades that followed. He is remembered for his versatility across comic, dramatic and historical roles, for playing King Philip II of France in Youssef Chahine's epic Saladin the Victorious (1963), for helping found Libya's National Theatre in Benghazi in the early 1970s, and for the affectionate nickname "Abu El-Banat" ("Father of the Daughters"), which he was said to have embraced with pride.

== Early life ==
Omar El-Hariri was born on 12 February 1926 in the Abdeen district of Cairo. Some later sources have given his birth year as 1922, although 1926 is the date reported by most biographical sources. He appeared briefly as a child actor in the 1937 film Salama Fi Khair, starring Naguib el-Rihani.

El-Hariri studied at the Higher Institute of Arabic Acting and graduated in 1947. He was in the same graduating class as Shoukry Sarhan. He later worked with several actors from his generation, including Kamal El-Shennawi, Salah Zulfikar and Ahmed Mazhar.

== Career ==
=== Stage beginnings ===
After graduating, El-Hariri joined the Ramses theatrical troupe, which was headed by actor and theatre director Youssef Wahbi. He made his stage debut in 1948 in El-Ghira ("Jealousy"), playing Ehsan. He later worked with the Egyptian National Theatre and appeared in television theatre productions.

=== Film career ===
El-Hariri made his adult film debut in 1950 in El Avocato Mediha ("Lawyer Mediha"), alongside Madiha Yousri and Youssef Wahbi. He went on to appear in films throughout the following decades, often in supporting roles. Among his credits were The Empty Pillow (1957), with Abdel Halim Hafez and Lobna Abdel Aziz; Lady of the Palace (1958), with Faten Hamama and Omar Sharif; Sokkar Hanem (1960), with Kamal El-Shennawi and Samia Gamal; River of Love (1960), with Omar Sharif and Faten Hamama; and The Traitress (1965), with Nadia Lutfi.

In 1963, El-Hariri appeared in Youssef Chahine's historical film Saladin the Victorious, playing King Philip II Augustus of France opposite Ahmed Mazhar, who played Saladin. He continued appearing in films during the 1970s and 1980s, including Said Marzouk's The Guilty (1976), The Judge and the Executioner (1978), Desire and Price (1978), People of the Summit (1981) and The Spider's Threads (1985). He also supplied the Arabic dubbed voice of Benito Mussolini for the Arabic-language version of Moustapha Akkad's Lion of the Desert (1981). His later film appearances included Ma'ali al Wazir (2002), in which he appeared with Ahmed Zaki.

=== Television ===
El-Hariri was among the established Egyptian film actors who began working in television as the medium developed in Egypt. His television credits included the sitcom Saken Osady, in which he played Kamal El-Hamrawy in several related productions from 1990 onward. He also appeared in Dreams of the Flying Boy (1978), alongside Adel Imam, as well as My Aunt Safeya and the Monastery, several productions in the One Thousand and One Nights series, the historical drama The Hilali Epic (1997), and Omar ibn Abdel Aziz (1994), in which he portrayed the Umayyad caliph Abd al-Malik ibn Marwan.

In 2010, El-Hariri appeared opposite Yehia El-Fakharany in Sheikh El-Arab Hammam ("The Last Kings of Upper Egypt"), playing Sheikh Youssef, an elder of the Hawara tribe. His final television appearance was in the 2011 Ramadan series Samara, which was broadcast several months before his death.

=== Work in Libya ===
In 1968, El-Hariri left Cairo to help establish Libya's National Theatre in Benghazi. He remained in Libya until 1974, working as an instructor in acting and directing and contributing to the establishment of the country's Popular Theatre. He later spoke positively about his time in Libya and reportedly declined a proposal to name the Popular Theatre after him.

=== Later stage work ===
El-Hariri appeared in several successful stage productions during the following decades. His credits included The Witness Who Saw Nothing (1976), in which he played Lieutenant Colonel Ahmed Abdel Salam, Al-Wad Sayed Al-Shaghal (1985), and Manawar Ya Basha (1993). The first two productions starred Adel Imam.

In 2010, El-Hariri returned to the story of Sokkar Hanem, having played the young suitor Farid in the 1960 film. In the stage adaptation, he played Qadri, the father of Nabil, alongside Lobna Abdel Aziz, Talaat Zakaria and Ahmed Rizk. His final stage appearance was in the children's play Hadiqat El-Azkiyaa ("The Garden of the Clever") in 2011, in which he played Amm Hakim.

== Personal life ==
El-Hariri was married three times and had three daughters, Nevine, who died before him, Merit, and Beri. He had no sons. He was sometimes known by the nickname "Abu El-Banat" ("Father of the Daughters"). His mother was a sister of actresses Zouzou Shakib and Mimi Chakib, who were both active in Egyptian cinema.

== Illness and death ==
In 2007, El-Hariri was diagnosed with bone cancer.

In October 2011, while performing in the children's play Hadiqat El-Azkiyaa, El-Hariri collapsed and was taken to Al-Gala Military Hospital in Cairo. He remained there for about a week and died on 16 October 2011, aged 85.

== Awards and recognition ==
El-Hariri received several honors during his career. These included the Shield of the Libyan Arab Jamahiriya, the Shield of the Hashemite Kingdom of Jordan, an award from Sudanese television, certificates of appreciation from Egypt's Ministry of Immigration and Egyptians Abroad and from an Egyptian cultural festival in the United States, and the Zaki Tolaimat Shield from the Academy of Arts. He was also honored by the Cairo International Festival for Experimental Theatre in 2004 and by the Free Theatre Festival. In 2003, he was among the actors honored at the 9th Egyptian National Film Festival.

A biography of El-Hariri's life and career, Omar El-Hariri... A Rainbow, was written by film critic Zeinab Aziz.

== Selected filmography ==
Year	Title	Role	Notes
1937	Salama Fi Khair	Child role	Film debut, as a child
1950	El Avocato Mediha	—	Adult film debut
1957	The Empty Pillow	Fouad	With Abdel Halim Hafez
1958	Lady of the Palace	Dr. Mustafa	With Faten Hamama, Omar Sharif
1959	Love Even to Worship	Engineer Ahmed Fahmy	With Salah Zulfikar, Taheyya Kariokka
1960	Sokkar Hanem	Farid Abu Warda	With Kamal El-Shennawi, Samia Gamal
1960	The River of Love	Mamdouh	With Omar Sharif, Faten Hamama
1963	Saladin the Victorious	King Philip II Augustus	With Ahmed Mazhar
1965	The Traitress	Shaker El-Damanhoury	With Nadia Lutfi
1976	The Guilty	Investigator Hussein Sedik	Directed by Said Marzouk
1978	The Judge and the Executioner	Kamal	
1978	Desire and Price	—	With Salah Zulfikar
1979	Qatel Ma Qatalsh Had	Rushdy, deputy prosecutor	
1981	People of the Summit	Zaghloul Raafat	With Nour El-Sherif
1981	Lion of the Desert	Mussolini (Arabic dub)	Directed by Moustapha Akkad
1985	The Spider's Threads	Abdel Azim El-Damanhoury	
2002	His Excellency the Minister	Prime Minister Hussein El-Ahmadi	With Ahmed Zaki

Selected television and stage credits include the television productions Saken Qsady, Dreams of the Flying Boy (1978), Omar ibn Abdel Aziz (1994), The Hilali Epic (1997), Sheikh El-Arab Hammam (2010) and Samara (2011), as well as the stage productions El-Ghira (1948), The Witness Who Saw Nothing (1976), Al-Wad Sayed Al-Shaghal (1985), Manawar Ya Basha (1993) and Sokkar Hanem (2010).
