= Karima Mokhtar =

Egyptian actress (1934–2017)

- Born: Attyat Mohamed Al Badry; 16 January 1934; Asyut, Kingdom of Egypt
- Died: 12 January 2017 (aged 82); Cairo, Egypt
- Occupation: Actress

Karima Mokhtar (Arabic: كريمة مختار, born Attyat Mohamed El Badry; 16 January 1934 – 12 January 2017) was an Egyptian stage, television and film Actor whose career spanned for more than fifty years, and was considered as the "Mother of Egyptian Drama".

== Life ==
Karima was born in Asyut, and graduated with a bachelor's degree in dramatic arts. She was married to actor and director Nour Eldemerdash, and they were the parents of television presenter Moataz Eldemerdash. She started her acting career in the radio show Baba Sharou, and continued in other radio shows, notably alongside movie star Salah Zulfikar in the 1963 serial Seven Letters. Her film and stage career lasted for more than fifty years. She has been labeled an iconic "mother figure" in Egyptian film, often playing "the mother" in films and television shows, such as in The Kids Have Grown Up and The Grandson (El Hafeed).

== Awards ==
In recognition of her contributions, she received numerous awards and recognitions. In 2007, Karima was named Best Television Actress at the Cairo Media Festival in Cairo, Egypt. Karima Mokhtar's 89th birthday was celebrated by a Google Doodle on 16 January 2023.
