= Madraset El Moshaghbeen =

The School of Mischievous
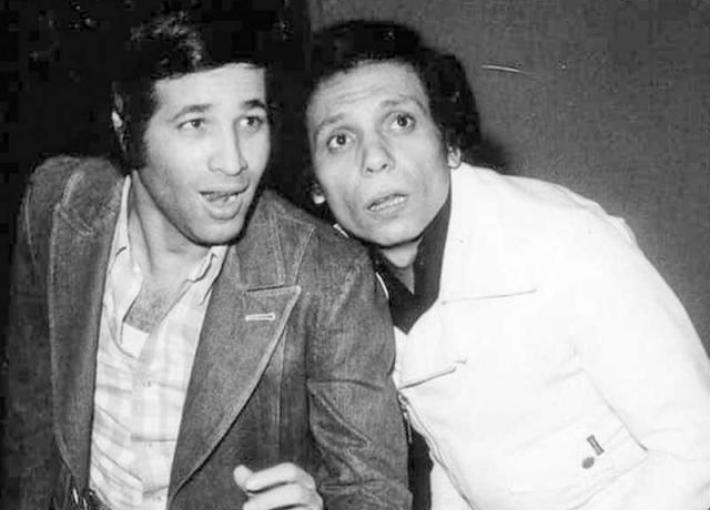
- Adel Imam and Saeed Saleh gathering behind the stage during the performance of Madrast Al-Mushaghebeen in 1973
- Directed by: Galal El Sharkawy
- Written by: Ali Salem
- Starring: Soher El Bably; Adel Emam; Saeed Saleh; Hady El Gayar; Hassan Moustafa; Younes Shalaby; Ahmad Zaki
- Music by: Sayed Mekawy and Abdel Rahman Shawqi
- Release date: 20 October 1971
- Running time: 252 minutes
- Country: Egypt
- Language: Egyptian Arabic

Madraset El Moshaghbeen (Arabic: مدرسة المشاغبين; English: School of the Rowdies) is a classical Egyptian comedy play written by Ali Salem and directed by Galal El Sharkawy. It is a loose retelling of To Sir with Love. It starred a cast of newcomers like Adel Emam, Saeed Saleh, Younes Shalaby, Ahmad Zaki, and Hasan Mustafa. The play was first televised on 24 October 1973.

== Overview ==
Unlike the original film, which is a drama dealing with racial and social issues in an inner city school, the Egyptian remake is primarily a comedy about five most notoriously bad students in the country who keep failing and retaking their last year of high school whose previous teachers were all led to mental breakdowns due to their pranks.

Madraset el-Moshaghbeen starred a cast of relatively new actors at the time, but due to its major success in Egypt and the Middle East it led the actors into stardom. Adel Imam was praised for his comedy and kicked started his career as one of the most popular comedic actors in the Middle East. Ahmad Zaki was highly praised for his role as Ahmed" and later did more serious roles in film.

== Plot ==
The story takes place in a school that consists of five rebellious students grouped together in one class, who have failed, for over a decade, to graduate school. The principal decides to hire a new female teacher, thinking that she can improve the behavior of these students. Effat, the new female teacher, takes on the task, meeting with little initial success. The plot concerns the back and forth between the students and their teacher's attempts at working with them.

== Legacy ==
The play is considered a classic, and is an Eid favourite. It was released on Netflix in 2020. In 2021, after decades in black and white, the play began streaming in colour, after sponsoring by the Saudi General Entertainment Authority.

== Cast ==
- Mervat Amin as Teacher Afaf
- Suhair El-Babili as Ms Effat
- Adel Emam as Bahgat Al-Abasiri
- Saeed Saleh as Morsi Al-Zanati
- Younes Shalabi as Mansour El-Moati
- Hadi El-Gayyar as Lotfy
- Ahmad Zaki as Ahmad
- Hassan Moustafa as Abd El-Moati the Principal
- Nazeem Sha'rawi as Bahgat's father
- Abd Allah Farghali as Allam El Malawani
- Samir Waly El Din as Jaber

== See also ==
- Rubabikia
- El Eyal Kebret
- Shahed Ma Shafsh Haga
