= Shahed Ma Shafsh Haga =

Shahed Ma Shafsh Haga (Arabic: شاهد ما شافش حاجه, lit. 'A Witness Who Saw Nothing') is a classical comedy play starring Adel Emam, Omar Elhariri and Nahed Gabr. June 1976

== Synopsis ==
Imam plays Sarhan Abdelbasir, a naive young man who presents a local children's television program and in his spare time he visits the zoo to feed rabbits which are his favorite animals. Madiha, his co-star is deeply in love with him and she tries to win his affection but he does not care about women or relationships. When his neighbour Enayat, a belly dancer is found murdered in her apartment, the police led by Inspector Ahmed Abdel-Salam (played by Omar Al-Hariri) investigate the crime scene as they suspect that Sarhan has something to do with the murder. They wait for Sarhan when he arrives home, and shock him with the news to which he innocently responds that he does not know anything and pleads his innocence.

In the second part, Ahmad informs Sarhan that he must go to court to testify after the real killer is arrested. Sarhan feels nervous as a witness and throughout the trial he gives ridiculous responses to every question he is asked. The judge advises him to overcome his fears which are crippling his life.

After the trial, he learns from his ordeal and realizes that he had lived his life like a rabbit; always afraid of everything, and decides to change his character and become a lion. He smokes, drinks alcohol and hangs pictures of women on the walls of his apartment instead of rabbits. Madiha notices how much Sarhan has changed and finds him repulsive after he suggests to her that she should work as a belly dancer. When Ahmed pays him a visit, he encourages him to be himself before the trial and entertain children again to which Sarhan refuses because it had made him a coward for years. The inspector brings his two children to meet Sarhan and gradually changes his mind when he realizes how much they like him.

== Actors ==
- Adel Emam as Sarhan Abdel-Baseer
- Omar Al-Hariri as Inspector Ahmed Abdel-Salam
- Nahed Jabr as Madiha
- Nazeem Sharawi as the Judge
- Badr Nawfal as Khalifa Khalaf Allah the defense lawyer
- Shawki Shamekh as the TV director
- Saeed Tarabeek as Kassem the prosecutor
- Sameer Waley Eddine as Officer Hussain
- Nasr Saif as Metwalli Marzouk the suspect

== See also ==
- El Eyal Kebret
- Madraset El Moshaghbeen
