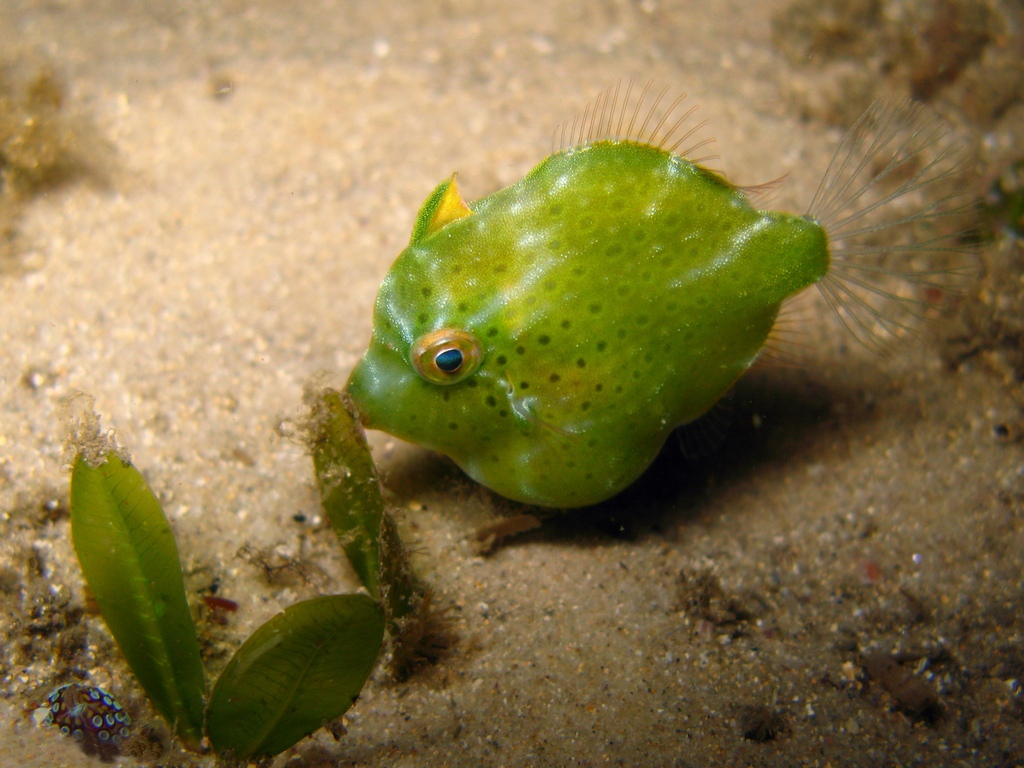

Scientific classification
- Kingdom: Animalia
- Phylum: Chordata
- Class: Actinopterygii
- Order: Tetraodontiformes
- Family: Monacanthidae
- Genus: Brachaluteres
- Species: B. jacksonianus

Binomial name
- Brachaluteres jacksonianus (Quoy & Gaimard, 1824)

= Southern pygmy leatherjacket =

Species of fish

The Southern pygmy leatherjacket (Brachaluteres jacksonianus) is a filefish endemic to Australia, found in temperate coastal waters and reefs from southern Queensland around to south-west Western Australia, including Tasmania.

== Taxonomy ==
The species was described in 1824 by the French zoologist Jean René Constant Quoy and naturalist Joseph Paul Gaimard. The genus name "Brachaluteres" is derived from the Greek brachys (meaning "short") and the Latin luteus (meaning "yellow"). The species name "jacksonianus" refers to Port Jackson, the Sydney harbour where Quoy and Gaimard obtained samples of the fish for description.

== Description ==
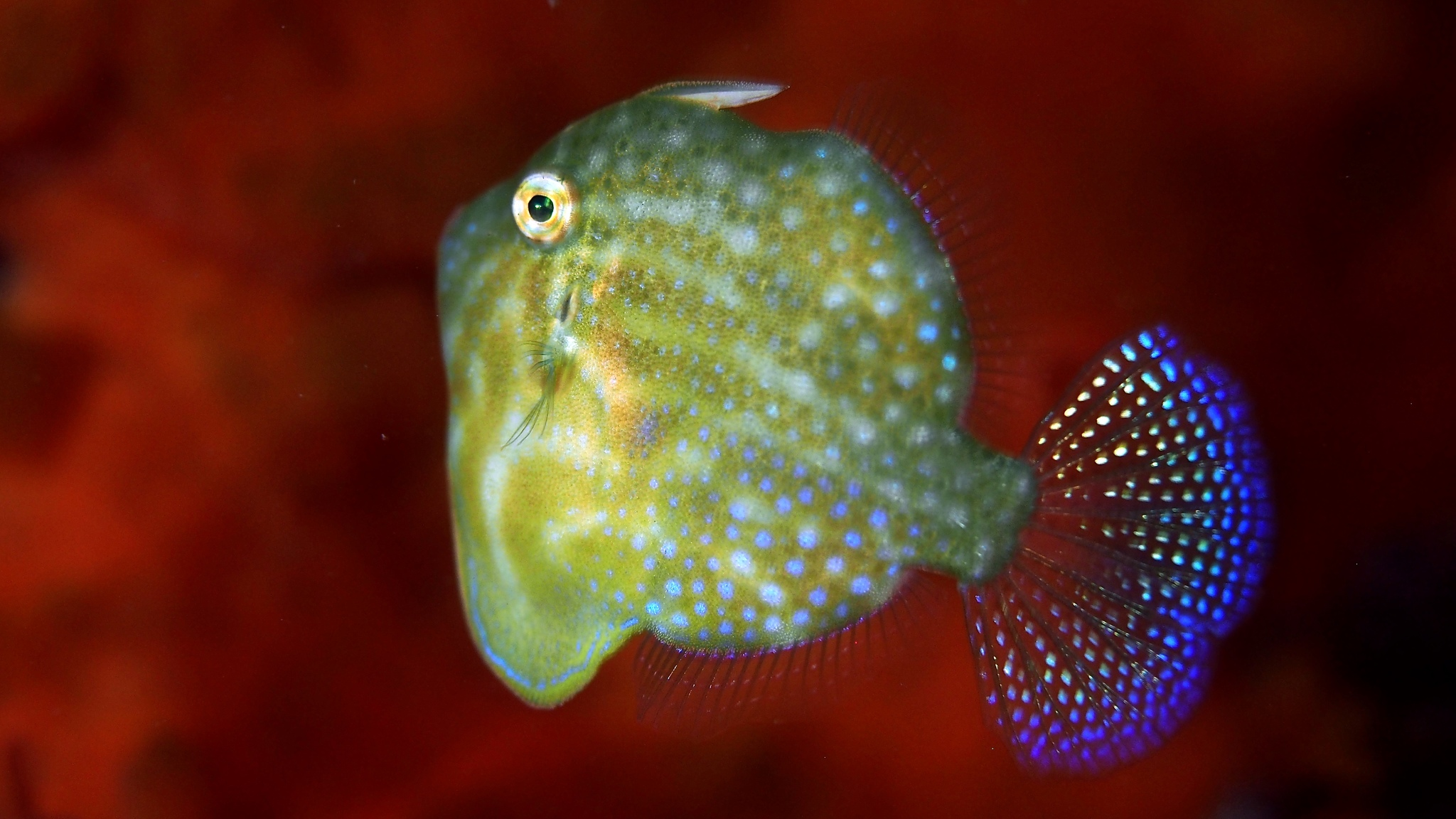

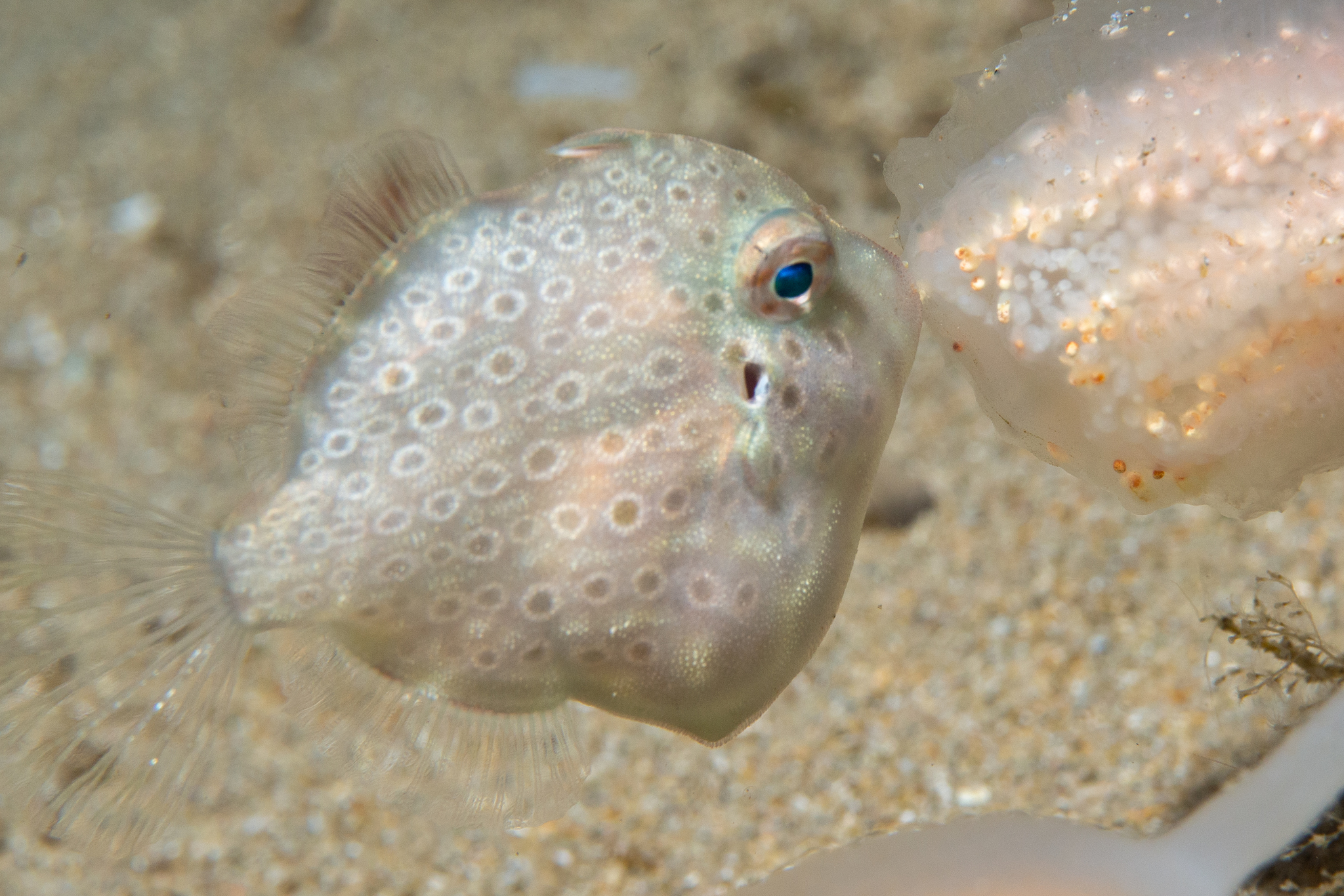

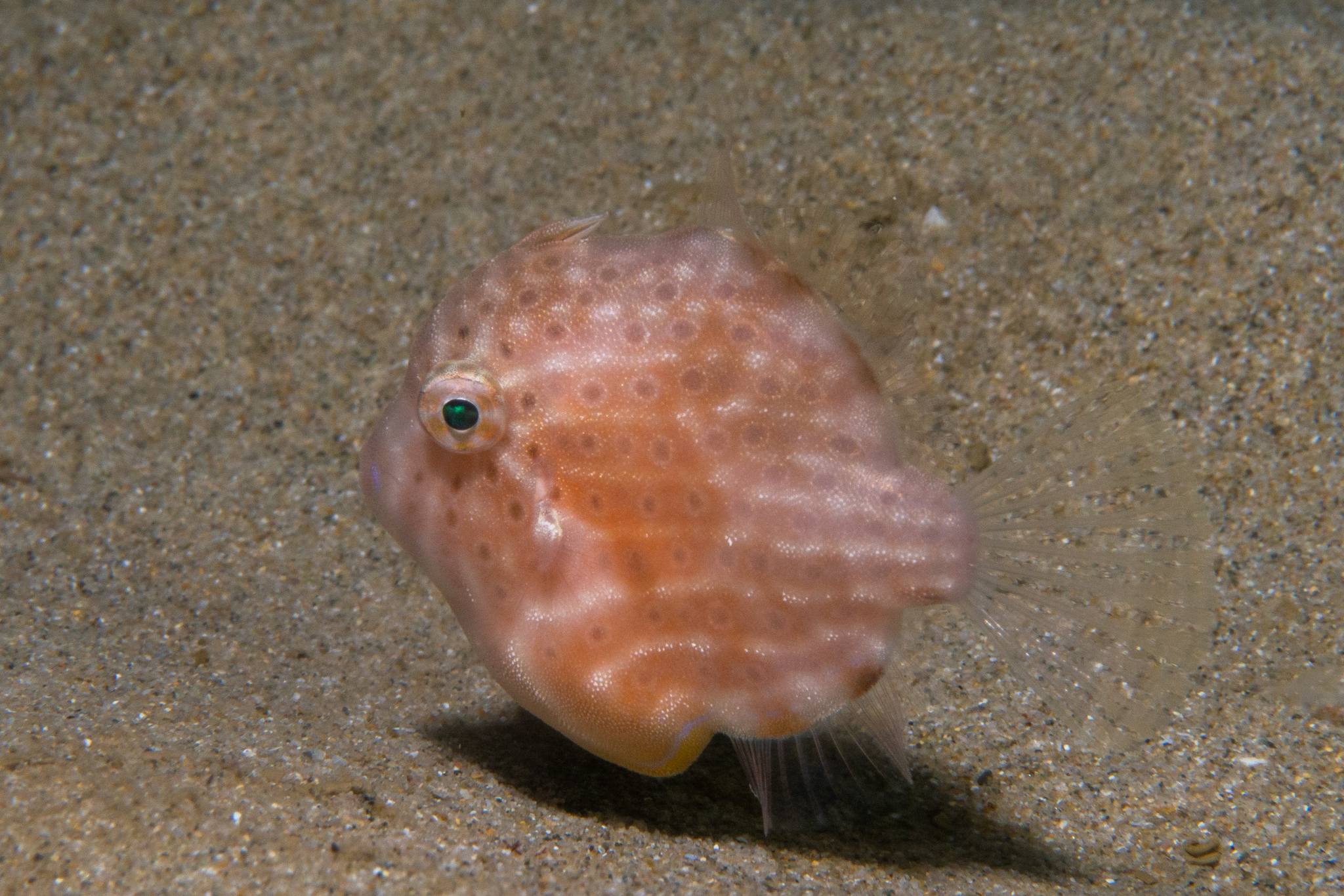

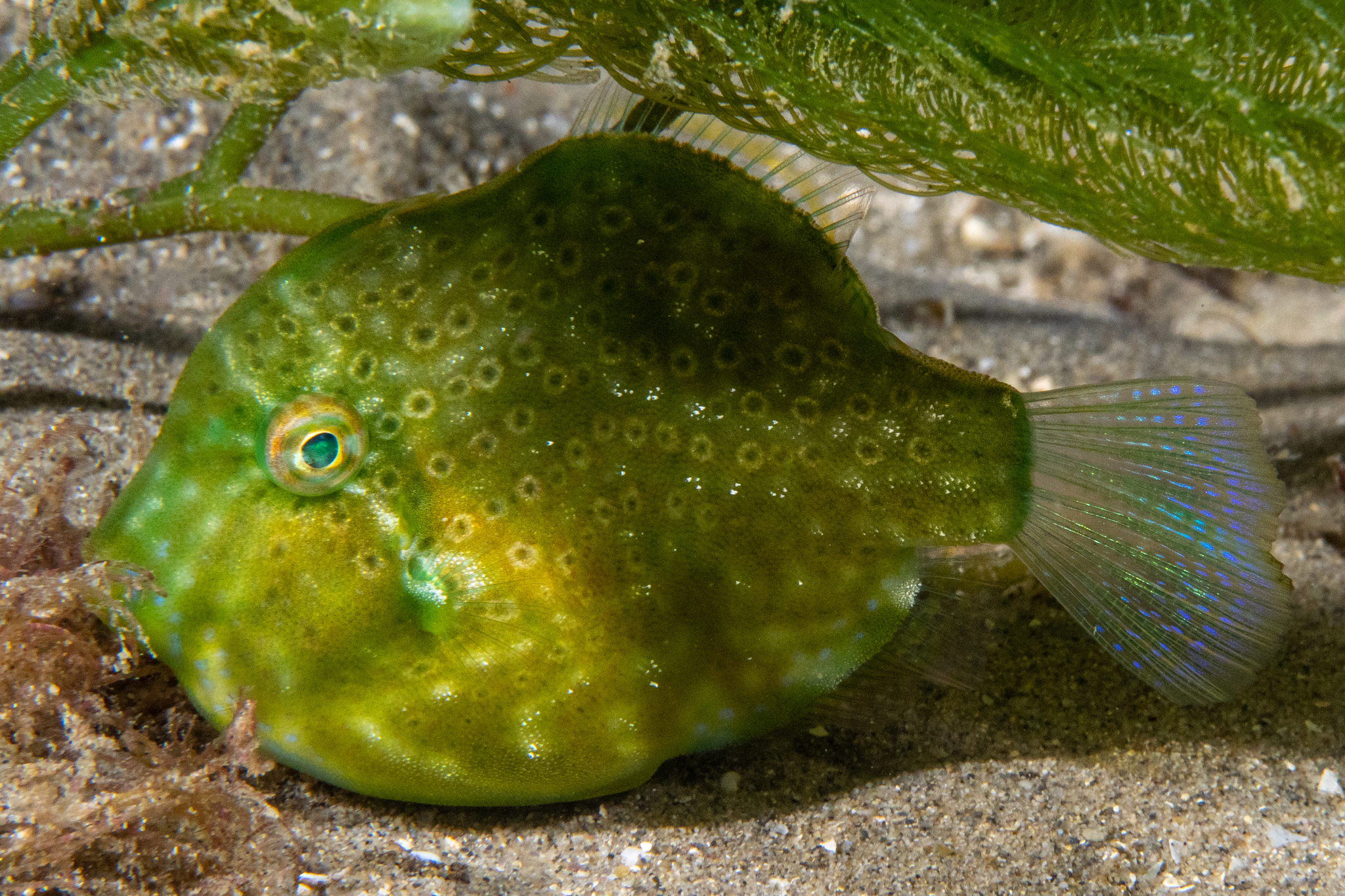

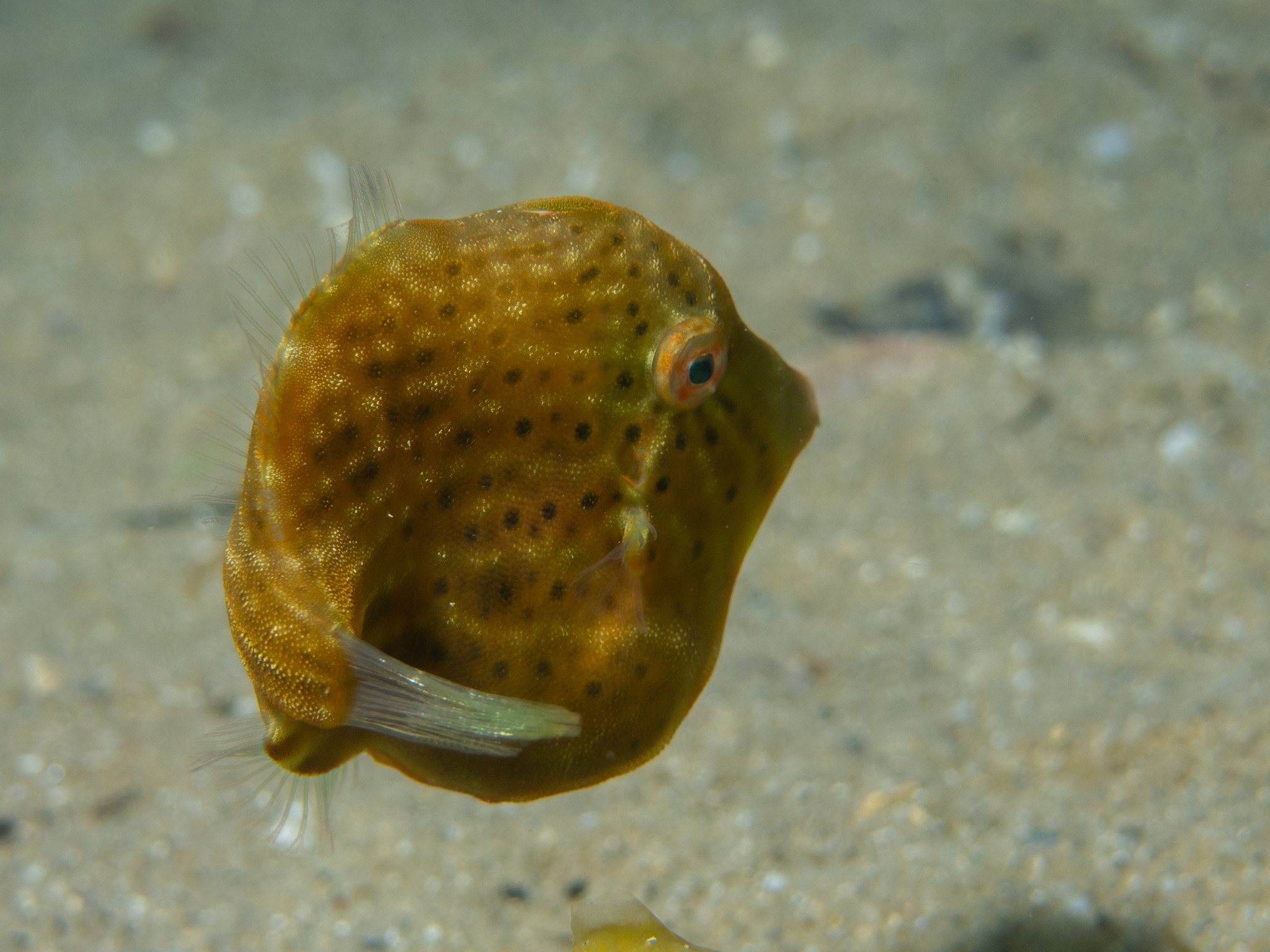

The fish is a small leatherjacket with a round, almost circular body, growing to a maximum of 9 centimetres (3.5 in). They are able to inflate their abdomen.

Colouration is highly variable, ranging from pale yellow-brown to dark green, and with numerous dark and light stripes, spots or ocelli. Colouration of a single fish can change during the courtship process.
