= Ahmed Bedier (actor) =

Egyptian actor

Ahmed Bdeir
- أحمد بدير
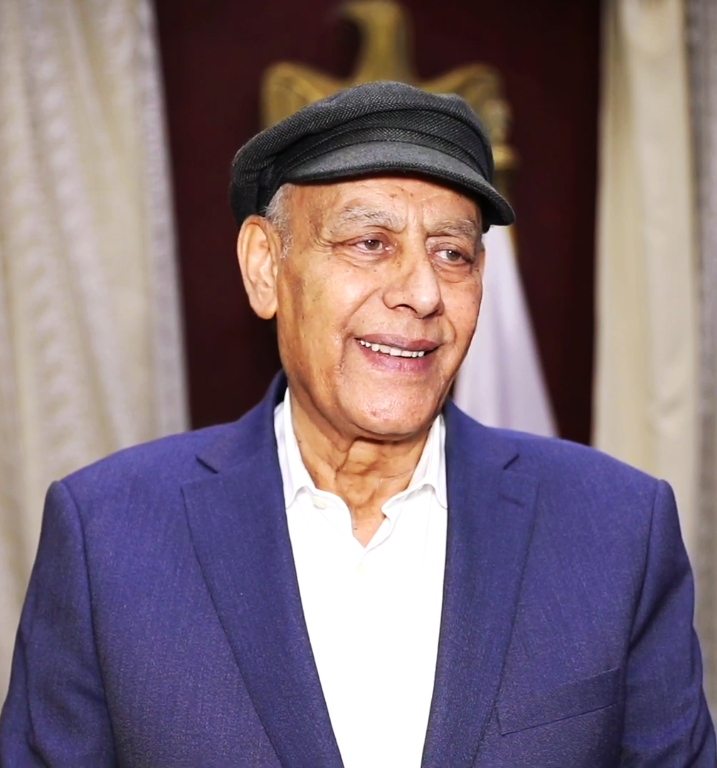
- Ahmed Bedir in 2022
- Born: June 20, 1945 (age 81); Qena Governorate, Kingdom of Egypt
- Occupations: Actor, comedian
- Years active: 1970–now
- Children: 2

Ahmed Bedier (Arabic: أحمد بدير; born on June 20, 1945) is an Egyptian actor who was born in the city of Qena in Upper Egypt.

== Early life ==
He graduated from high school in 1966, and after four years, he received his university degree in arts from Cairo University in 1970. He worked as an actor in youth center theaters before becoming a writer and director. He then worked as an actor in radio in several series, including (The Sad Nightingale, Al-Zini Barakat, The Dream of Night and Day, City Gates, Zizinya), and also worked in theater in many works, including (Raya and Sakina, Bachelor's in Ruling People, The Sa'idis Have Arrived, On the Sidewalk, Constitution, Our Lords). In cinema, he took on small roles, with works like (Karnak, Silence We Will Watch, Days of Terror, Sons and Killers, Hero of Paper) and others. He is married and has two daughters, Sarah and Dua'.

== Personal life ==
Ahmed Bedier is married and has two daughters, Sarah and Dua.

== Artistic journey ==
Ahmed Bedier enriched Egyptian art with many films, TV series, radio programs, and plays, totaling more than 220 works.

=== 1970s ===
His first work was a small role in the film "The Sparrow" (Arabic: العصفور) by Youssef Chahine in 1972.

His contributions in the 1970s were in the following works:

==== Radio series ====
- The Plains and the Hamoul

==== Films ====
- Alexandria... Why?
- The Last Confession
- The Love That Was
- The Respectable Husband
- Karnak
- The Game
- Sons of the Good
- The Bathhouse of Al-Malatyli
- Shafika and Metwally
- Take Me and I Will Take You
- The Return of the Prodigal Son
- A Kind of Women
- Behind the Sun
- Hepta as Abdel Hamid Taha

===== Plays =====
- Bachelor's in Ruling People
- Pension of Dreams
- Raya and Sakina
- The Sa'idi Have Arrived
- Husband and Walnut
- Fourth Floor, Apartment Nine

===== TV series =====
- Bitter Tongue
- The Giant
- Days of Misery
- The Dream of the Flying Boy
- The Tower of Luck
- Zainab and the Throne
- Women's Deception
- The Conqueror
- At the Gate of Zuwaila.

=== 1980s ===
During the 1980s, his career saw significant roles that impacted the audience, including his participation in the play "Raya and Sakina" with actress Shadia, Soher El Bably, Abdel Moneim Madbouly, and directed by Hussein Kamal.

His contributions in the 1980s were in the following works:

==== Films ====
- The Louts
- The Rebels
- The Women's Police
- The Tragedy of the Sun
- The World on the Wing of a Dove36
- The Man Who Sneezed246
- The Musician
- Mr. Qishta57
- Sergeant Hassan546
- Patience in the Salt Works
- The Lost AirplaneUI 4
- The Ring and Bracelet6U
- The Gang46UJ
- The Barge 70ART
- The Deadly JealousyRT
- The SharkJ
- The Liar
- The Fateful Night
- The Addict
- The Doomed One
- The Minister Is Coming
- The Insane Strike
- Rape
- Sons and Killers
- Rizq Ya Dunia
- Mothers in Exile
- I Am the Mad One
- Days of Challenge
- Days of Horror
- Paper Hero
- The Devil's Daughters
- Our Neighborhood Daughters
- Students of the Last Era
- Men of Bab Al-Shari'a
- Possession Case
- Love Above the Clouds
- Take Care of Your Mind
- The Artist's Path
- Extremely Confidential
- Orphaned Saad
- The Road Trip
- Hamza’s Furnace
- Birds in the Sky
- A Very Troublesome Family
- The Tin Village
- Dog Bite
- The Sign Means Wrong
- At the Gate of the Minister
- Antar Shakes His Sword
- Forest of Men
- The Poor Do Not Enter Heaven
- Names and Features
- How Sad You Are, Love
- I'm Not a Criminal
- The Night of Arresting Bekiza and Zaghoul
- A Life Journey
- Wanted Dead or Alive
- Maghaury in the College
- Samia Sharaawi’s File
- A File in the Arts
- The Hallucination Kingdom
- Who Killed This Love
- Who Is the Thief Among Us
- Wasted People and People Who Have No Life
- We Share Your Joy
- The Port Beasts

==== Plays ====
- The Sa'idi Have Arrived
- On the Sidewalk
- Honey and Sugar
- Raya and Sakina
- Coma
- Marsy Wants a Chair
- Your Health in the World
- Me, She, and the Computer
- Two in the Air
- Fourth Floor, Apartment 9
- Constitution, Our Lords
- Ten Stars
- Something in My Patience
- His Mother Brought Him
- Good Luck
- Bachelor's in Ruling People
- Pension of Dreams
- Yogurt Cabbage
- Husband and Walnut
- Do You Want to Catch Him?
- And Win, O Bag

==== TV series ====
- Al-Bashayer
- Al-Zanqloni
- Howa wa heya
- The Cave, the Illusion, and Love
- Who Has a Pound
- Escape to Prison
- City Gates - In Several Parts
- Days Not Wasted
- The Tower of the Elite
- Marry and Smile for Life
- Stories of Him and Her
- A Man Without a Past
- The Bangles
- There Is No God But God - Part Three
- Prophet Mohammad
- Fire and Smoke
- The Stormy Events Followed
- My Son
- Plays
- The Stars Hotel
- Run Run
- Wonderful - TV Evening

=== 1990s ===
During the 1990s, he participated in numerous works, and his contributions in the 1990s were in the following works:

==== Films ====
- Sons of Exile
- Assassination of Faten Tawfiq
- The Empress
- Professor
- Humiliation
- The Dancer and the Prisoner
- Speed Does Not Exceed Zero
- Those Who Danced on the Stairs
- The Mood
- The Millionaire Vagabond
- The Immigrant
- A Woman on Top
- Kill My Wife, And Here's My Regards
- Me and My Mother-in-Law and Time
- Foxes and Rabbits
- Hell 2
- A Crime Except Quarter
- Gamal Abdel Nasser
- Circle of Death
- Path of Fear
- Tears of the Great Lady
- Hear Hush
- Sheds
- The Teacher's Boys
- Soldier Lineup
- Knight of the City
- Fatima and the Mercedes
- In the Summer, Love Is Madness
- Congratulations, a Thousand Congratulations
- Huda and His Excellency the Minister

==== Plays ====
- Fourth Floor, Apartment 9
- Two in the Air.
- Me, She, and the Computer
- Win, O Bag
- Do You Want to Catch Him?
- Husband and Walnut
- Yogurt Cabbage
- On the Sidewalk

==== TV series ====
- Innocent in the Trap
- Al-Zini Barakat
- The Sunset Never Comes Secretly
- Deferred Dreams
- One Thousand and One Nights, Clever Hassan
- Zizinya - Part One
- Mr. Show
- A Bride is Wanted
- People, Sons of People
- And Time Is Still With Us

=== 2000s ===
==== Films ====
- Greenhouse Love, Green as My Heart, All Movies Are A
- Check-mate
- Arab City Police
- Artists Stop Action
- Nothing Is True
- Court Sessions
- Intimate Women

==== TV series ====
- Al-Shater
- Al-Saher
- The Director's Office
- The Beautiful City
- The Creative Writer
- In the Middle of the Street
- One Minute with Me
- Last Chance
- Partners in Crime
- The Elegant Wedding

=== 2010s ===
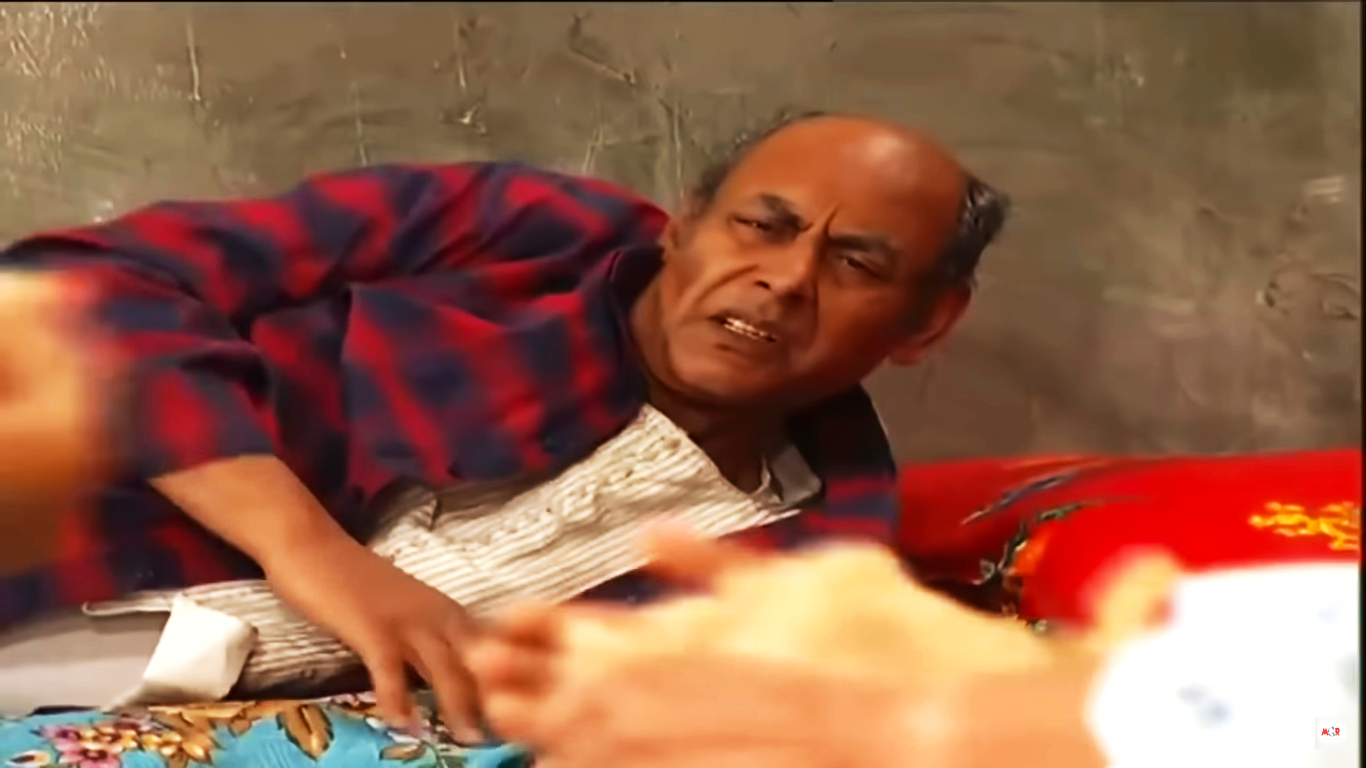
Bedir on the stage in 2008.

In the 2010s, Ahmed Bedier continued to engage in various works across television, cinema, and theater, often playing significant roles that received attention and appreciation.

==== Films ====
- The Power of the Heart
- The Great Love Story
- When a Crime Is Committed
- The Bitter Summer
- Return to Paradise
- Through the Clouds
- Love on the Edge of Time
- Behind Closed Doors
- When Fate Meets

==== TV series ====
- My Sister’s Eyes
- Aliya's World
- The City of Light
- We Were Never Meant to Meet
- The Black Knight
- A Tale of Hearts
- The Secret Behind the Mirror
- End of the Road

=== 2020s ===
In the 2020s, Ahmed Bedier has continued his legacy in the acting industry, showcasing his experience and range with roles in both television and film, cementing his place as one of Egypt's respected artists.

==== Films ====
- The Last Call
- The Battle of Faith
- Dreams of the Forgotten
- Silent Revolution

==== TV series ====
- Secrets of the Forgotten
- The River of Time
- The Hidden Treasure
- Rebirth of the Soul
