= Naeem Issa =

Egyptian actor (1933–2025)

- Born: 6 January 1933; Cairo, Egypt
- Died: 5 May 2025 (aged 92); Alexandria, Egypt
- Occupation: Actor
- Years active: 1970–2016

Naeem Issa (Egyptian Arabic: نعيم عيسى; 6 January 1933 – 5 May 2025) was an Egyptian film, television and stage actor.

== Life and career ==
Issa was born on 6 January 1933, in the Gamaleya neighborhood in Cairo. He was a worker in the theaters of cultural palaces in Alexandria, and the naval military theater he joined the Madbouly troupe and the Alexandria troupe at the beginning of his artistic career after which he participated in many plays, perhaps the most prominent of which was the role of Al-Wad Sayed Al-Shaghal.

Issa died on 5 May 2025 after contracting severe pneumonia. He was 92.
