= El Eyal Kebret =

Play by Bahgat Kamar (1979)

- Original language: Arabic Egyptian
- Genre: Play, Comedy

Premiere
- Place premiered: Egypt

El Eyal Kebret (Arabic: العيَال كبرت, lit. 'The Kids Have Grown Up') is a classical Egyptian comedy play, released in 1979, starring Saeed Saleh, Ahmad Zaki, Yunis Shalabi, and Nadia Shoukry as the children. Hassan Mustafa plays the role of the father with Karima Mokhtar playing the role of the mother. The play tells the story of the children trying to stop their father from leaving his family for another woman after one of them accidentally finds a love letter from an unknown woman to their father.

== Note ==
- This is the second play Sa'ed Saleh, Ahmad Zaki, Yunis Shalabi, and Hassan Mustafa starred in together since the play Madraset El Moshaghbeen.

== See also ==
- Madraset El Moshaghbeen
- Shahed Ma Shafsh Haga
