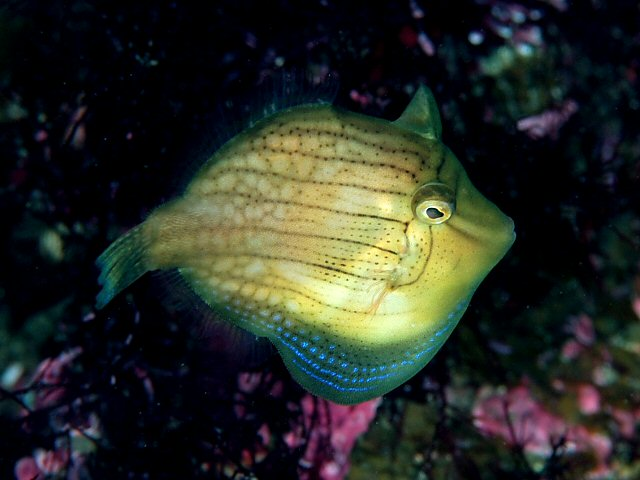

Scientific classification
- Kingdom: Animalia
- Phylum: Chordata
- Class: Actinopterygii
- Order: Tetraodontiformes
- Family: Monacanthidae
- Genus: Brachaluteres
- Species: B. ulvarum

Binomial name
- Brachaluteres ulvarum (Jordan & Fowler, 1902)

= Brachaluteres ulvarum =

Species of fish

Brachaluteres ulvarum, known commonly as the Japanese inflator filefish, is a species of marine fish in the family Monacanthidae.

The Japanese inflator filefish is an endemic species living in the south of Japan.

It's a small sized fish that can reach a maximum size of 7.5 cm in length.
