= Soher El Bably =

Egyptian actress (1937–2021)

- سهير البابلى
- Born: Soher Helmi Ibrahim El Bably; 14 February 1937; Faraskur, Kingdom of Egypt
- Died: 21 November 2021 (aged 84); Cairo, Egypt
- Education: Institute of Theatrical Arts
- Occupation: Actress
- Years active: 1957–2021
- Notable work: A Moment of Weakness

Soher El Bably or Soher Elbabli (Arabic: سهير البابلي; 14 February 1937 – 21 November 2021) was an Egyptian actress.

== Biography ==
After completing secondary school, El Bably attended the Institute of Theatrical Arts. She starred in the play Madraset El Moshaghbeen (1973), and also in a stage version of the life of Raya and Sakina with famous actress Shadia in 1985. She appeared in Mahmoud Zulfikar's The Unknown Woman (1959), the film was a good start in her cinematic career.

In the 1960s, El Bably co-starred in The Most Dangerous Man in the World (1967). She had a major role in The Passion and the Body (1972). In the 1980s, she co-starred in Moment of Weakness (1981), An Egyptian Story (1982) by Youssef Chahine and Busting Bakiza and Zaghlool (1988). She got married five times, and her second husband was Mounir Mourad.

== Selected filmography ==
=== Films ===
- 1959: The Unknown Woman
- 1961: Rendezvous with the Past
- 1965: Dawn of a New Day
- 1967: The Most Dangerous Man in the World
- 1972: The Passion and the Body
- 1981: A Moment of Weakness
- 1982: An Egyptian Story
- 1988: Busting Bakiza and Zaghloul

=== Stage ===
- 1973: Madrast Al-Mushaghebeen
- 1978: Masyadet Ragel Motazaweg
- 1983: Raya wa Sekina

=== Television ===
- 1977: The Truth..That Unknown
- 1986: Bakiza and Zaghloul
