= Al-Wad Sayed Al-Shaghal =

El-Wad Sayyed El-Shaghghal (Arabic: الواد سيد الشغال, lit. 'The Working Boy, Sayyed') is a comedy play consisting of eight scenes. The play was written by Sayyed Hegab and Samir Abdelazim. Also, It was directed by Hesin Kamal, and starring Adel Emam, Omar Al-Hariri, Mustafa Metwalli, Moshira Ismail, Ragaa Al Geddawy, and Youssef Dawoud. In the first three years of the play, the female lead was played by Sawsan Badr. The play was first performed on June 20, 1985, and it ran for two hours and 53 minutes. The important thing is that the play has been performed for eight years which made it in the second place in the list of plays with the longest performances on the stage, after Bodyguard. Adel Emam was accused of blasphemy and contempt for religions because of several scenes in which he had imitated religious sheikhs in a funny way.

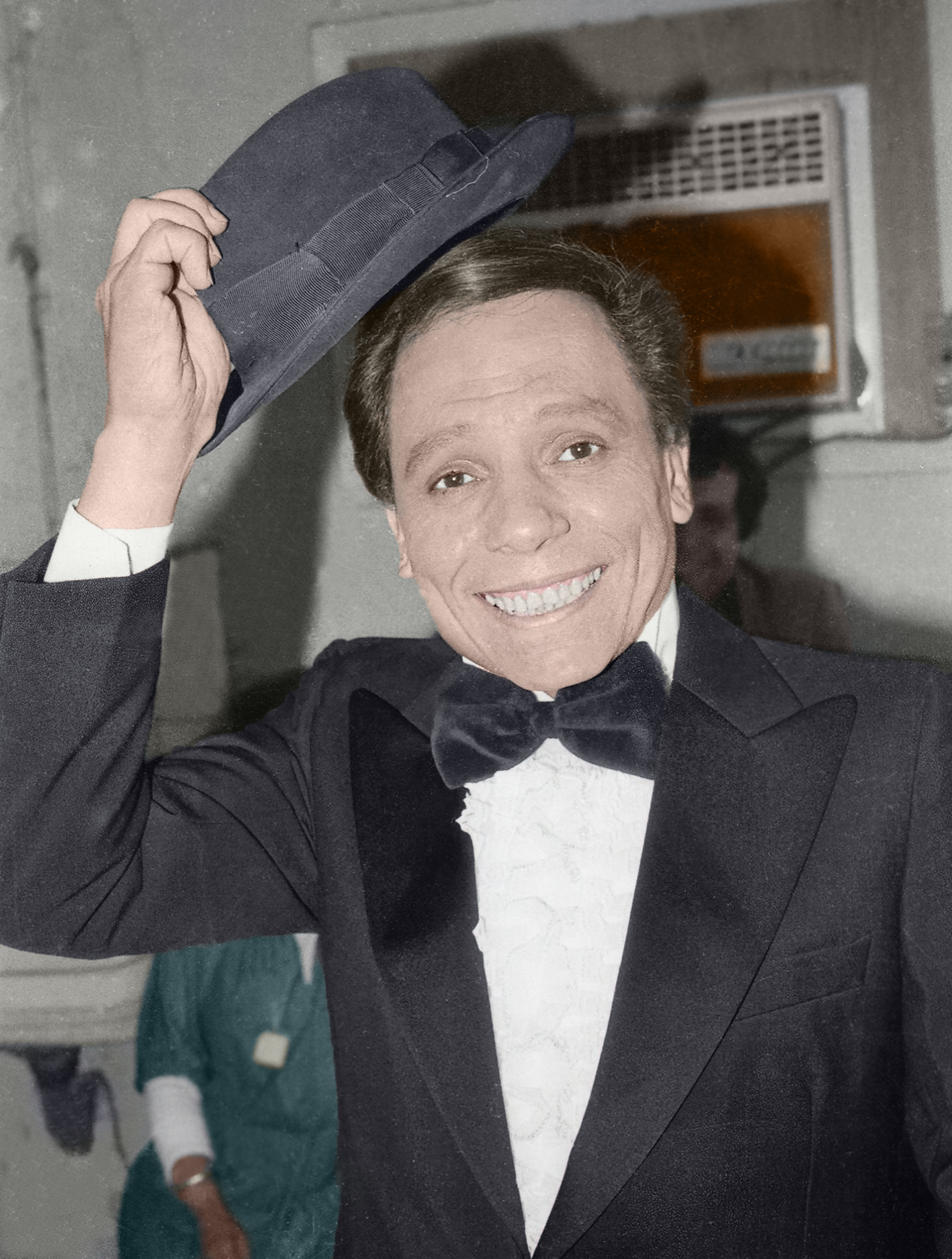
Adel Emam in the eighties

El-Wad Sayyed El-Shaghghal is one of the most successful plays of Adel Emam, which has become part of the Eid rituals over the years. Consequently, it became a classic play. Also, it is considered to be one of the most prominent plays in the Egyptian theatre since it includes symbolic and powerful sentences that indicate the difference between the classes of Arab society. In the play, Sayed escapes from his prison sentence after beating up a swindler. He goes to take shelter with his cook uncle, who works for a wealthy family, and hides from the police there. During his escape, he helps his uncle serve the family. Also, he gets to know the aristocracy, and begins a comedic comparison between the world of the rich and the world of the poor in Arab countries.

== Cast ==
- Adel Emam as Sayed Kawawi.
- Omar Al-Hariri as Mr. Asim.
- Sawsan Badr as Huda (The Early Years Shows), later Mushira Ismail.
- Ragaa Al Geddawy as Mrs. Doreya.
- Mustafa Metwalli as Sharif.
- Farouk Flakas as Milad.
- Badr Nofal as Maghawry.
- Youssef Dawoud as Jamlawi.
- Ahmed Abdel Hadi as Fikri Rustom Abdel Hamid.
