= Saeed Saleh =

Egyptian actor (1940–2014)

- سعيد صالح
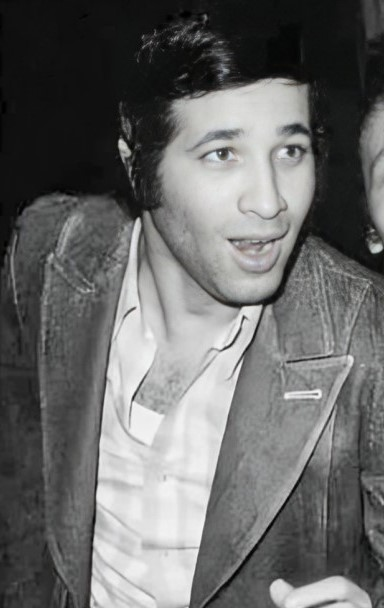
- Saeed Saleh behind the stage during the performance of Madraset El-Moshaghebeen in 1973
- Born: July 30, 1940; Majiria, Monufia, Kingdom of Egypt
- Died: August 1, 2014 (aged 74); Cairo, Egypt
- Burial place: Majiria, Monufia, Egypt
- Education: Cairo University
- Occupation: Actor
- Years active: 1958–2014

Saeed Saleh, also credited as Sa'eed Saleh Ibrahim (Arabic: سعيد صالح إبراهيم; July 31, 1940 – August 1, 2014), was an Egyptian comedian actor.

== Biography ==
Saleh earned his bachelor of arts degree from Cairo University in 1960. He is most famous for his theatre roles in Al Ayal Kibrit and Madraset El-Moshaghebeen, in addition to acting in almost one third of all Egyptian movies. In 1974, he acted with Salah Zulfikar in In Summer We Must Love.

He was imprisoned in November 1995 for one year, due to his possession of drugs. In 2010, he acted with Adel Emam in Alzheimer's film, while suffering from Alzheimer's disease. In 2011, Adel Emam vowed that he would pay all of Saleh's medical expenses, after hearing about his health crisis.

He died in 2014 and was buried in his hometown, Majiria, Monufia Governorate.

== Filmography ==
- Qasr El Shouq (1966)
- Witch (1971) – TV short
- In Summer We Must Love (1974)
- Dunya (1974)
- The Bullet is Still in My Pocket (1974)
- Where Is My Mind? (1974)
- Shouq (1976)
- Laiali Yasmeen (1978)
- Al Mashbouh (1981)
- Ala Bab El Wazeer (1982)
- Gabroat Imraa (1984)
- Nos Arnab (1985)
- Ibn Tahya Azouz (1986)
- Salam Ya Sahby (1987)
- Fatwat EL Salakhana (1989)
- El Sa'ayda Gom (1989)
- Almshaghebon Fe Noabae (1992)
- El Lee'b A'la El Makshouf (1993)
- Al-Suqout Fi Bir Sabe (1994)
- Belia We Demagho El Aliaa (2000)
- Ameer Al-Thalaam (2002)
- Zahaimar (2010)
- Metaab wa Shadya (2012)

== Plays ==
- Ka'abaloon (1985)
- Madraset Al-Moshaghebeen (1973)
- Al Ayal Kibrit (1979)
- Hallo Shalabi (1969)

== TV series ==
- Ahlam Alfata Altaaer (1978)
- Bel Alwan ElTabeaya (2009)
- 9 Gameat El Dowal (2012)
- Al Morafa'a (2014)

== See also ==
- List of Egyptians
