= Sahab =

Sahab may refer to:

== Given name ==
- Sahab Uddin Ahmed (born 1963), Indian politician
- Sahab Singh Chauhan (1950–2018), Indian politician
- Sahab Uddin Choudhury, Indian politician
- Sahab Singh Gurjar (born 1971), Indian politician
- Sahab Qazalbash (1926–2004), Pakistani actress and writer

== Surname ==
- Abbas Sahab (1921–2000) Iranian cartographer
  - Sahab Geographic and Drafting Institute, a cartographical institute in Iran
- Devi Sahab (1841–1919), a leader of the Sant Mat religious movement
- Maharaj Sahab (1861–1907), revered Sant Satguru of the Radhasoami faith
- Selim Sahab (born 1941), contemporary conductor and composer

== Other uses ==
- Sahab, Jordan, a district
  - Industrial City of Sahab
  - Sahab SC, a football club
- As-Sahab, the media wing of al-Qaeda

== See also ==
- Sahib, an honorific from Arabic
- Saheb (disambiguation), and Sahib
- Saab (disambiguation)
- Sahebabad (disambiguation)
- Companions of the Prophet, or Sahabah
