= Saab =

Saab or SAAB may refer to:

== Brands and enterprises ==
- Saab AB, a Swedish aircraft, aerospace and defence company, still known as SAAB, and together with subsidiaries as Saab Group
  - Datasaab, a former computer company, started as spin off from Saab AB
- Saab Automobile, a former Swedish automobile manufacturer, formerly a division of Saab AB
  - SaabO, a caravan (camper/travel trailer) produced by Saab Automobile from 1964 to 1968
- Saab-Scania, the former corporate group formed by Saab AB and Scania-Vabis

== People with the surname ==
- Alejandro Saab (born 1994), American voice actor
- Alex Saab (born 1971), Colombian businessman charged with money laundering
- Elie Saab (born 1964), Lebanese fashion designer
- Hassan Saab (1922–1990), Lebanese diplomat and political scientist
- Jocelyne Saab (1948–2019), Lebanese filmmaker
- Karin Saab (born 2001), Venezuelan footballer
- Tarek William Saab (born 1963), Venezuelan politician
- Tarek Saab (businessman), candidate on The Apprentice
- Valeska Saab (born 1984), Ecuadorian beauty queen and politician
- Jason Saab (born 1999), Australian rugby league player

== Other uses ==
- Student African American Brotherhood, a US student organization

== See also ==
- SAB (disambiguation)
- Sabb (disambiguation)
- Sahab (disambiguation)
