= Yamaha YM1 =

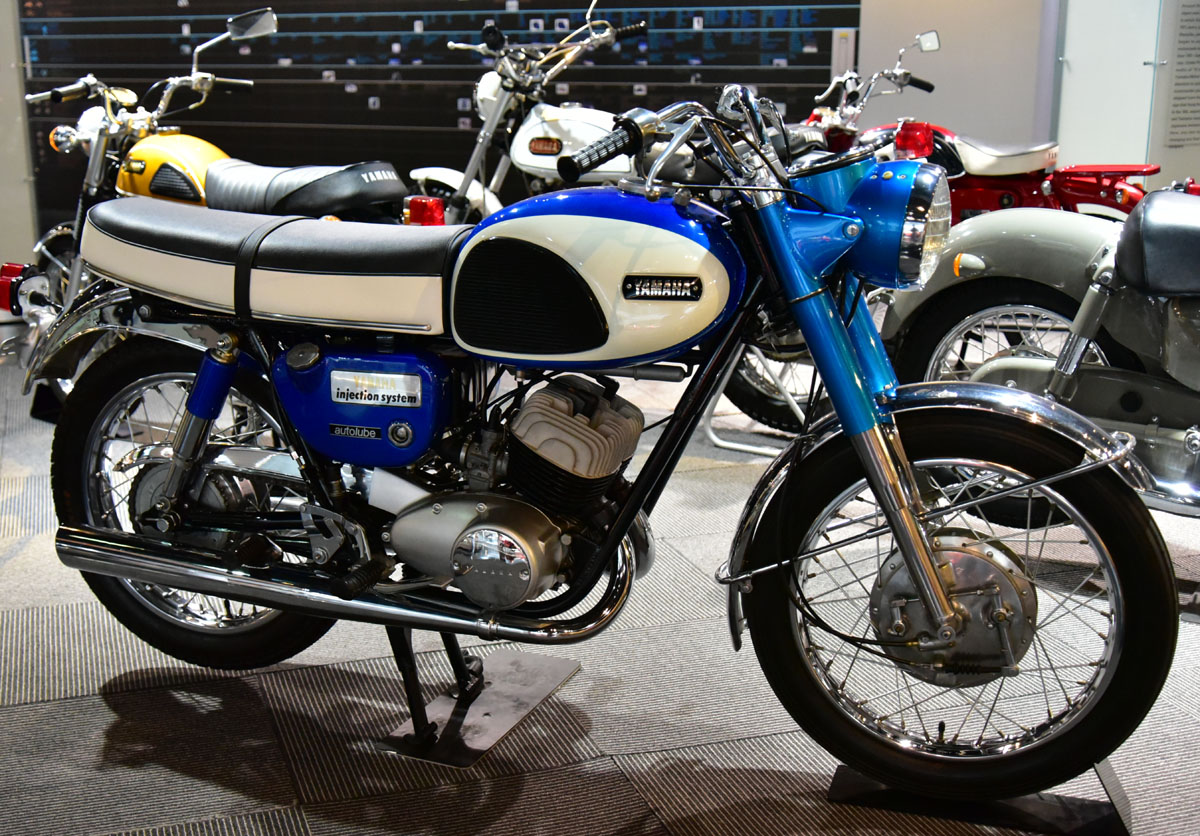
Yamaha YM1

The Yamaha YM1 is a motorcycle produced by Yamaha from 1964 to 1966. It used a 305 cc 2-stroke engine. It shared common parts with the 246 cc YDS3 and was virtually identical in all respects with the exception of bore and stroke.

The YM1 featured an oil-injection system that fed oil to the carburettor intake, the oil flow increasing as the throttle was opened. This gave the motorcycle sufficient lubrication for the crankshaft, cylinders, connecting rods, and pistons without requiring premixing of the oil and gas and with reduced use of oil.

Blue/white, red/white and black/white models were available for the YM1, which had a top speed of approximately 100 mph. The YM1 was an economical machine with high performance, being originally priced under $800 and capable of nearly 100mph, when such a speed was unusual for a small-capacity motorcycle.
