= 1972 Lebanese general election in Beirut III =

Voting to elect five members of the Lebanese parliament took place in the Beirut III district (one of three electoral districts in the city) in 1972, as part of the national general election of that year. Beirut III, consisting of the predominantly Muslim part of the city, had 4 Sunni Muslim seats and 1 Greek Orthodox seat (for more information about the Lebanese election system, see Elections in Lebanon).

The election in Beirut III was fiercely contested, with small margins between winning and losing sides. Two lists of candidates were in the fray in Beirut III, a list led by incumbent Prime Minister of Lebanon Saeb Salam and a list led by former Prime Minister Abdallah El-Yafi. There were also a number of independent candidates.

The election of Nasserist politician Najah Wakim, a leader of the Union of Working People's Forces, for the Greek Orthodox seat was one of the big surprises of the 1972 election. He did not run on any of the major lists, but Wakim unseated the veteran Greek Orthodox politician Nasim Majdalani. The Greek Orthodox community held a demonstration protesting against Wakim's election, arguing that he had been elected by Sunni voters.

== Results ==
Candidate	List	Votes	Sect	Elected?
Saeb Salam	Salam	18,425	Sunni	Yes
Zaki Mazboudi	Salam	16,489	Sunni	Yes
Najah Wakim	Independent	16,033	Greek Orthodox	Yes
Jamil Kibbi	Salam	13,300	Sunni	Yes
Uthman ad-Dana	El-Yafi	12,872	Sunni	Yes
Usama al-Fakhuri	El-Yafi	12,264	Sunni	
Shafik Wazzan	Salam	12,086	Sunni	
Nasim Majdalani	Salam	11,031	Greek Orthodox	
Mu'in Hamud	Independent	9,492	Sunni	
Muhammad Itani	El-Yafi	9,081	Sunni	
Abdallah El-Yafi	El-Yafi	8,734	Sunni	
Roger Assi	El-Yafi	7,503	Greek Orthodox	
Hassan Saab	Independent	5,217	Sunni	
Basim al-Jisr	Independent	4,165	Sunni	

In addition to the candidates in the table above, there were eight Sunni and three Greek Orthodox candidates that each received less than 4,000 votes.
