= Georgia Highlands College =

Public college in Rome, Georgia, US

- Other names: Georgia Highlands, Highlands, GHC
- Former names: Floyd Junior College (1970–1987); Floyd College (1987–2005)
- Motto: Take Charge of Your Future
- Type: Public college
- Established: 1970; 56 years ago
- Parent institution: University System of Georgia
- President: Mike Hobbs
- Students: 4,796
- Location: Four locations: Rome, Cartersville, Marietta, and Dallas, Georgia, U.S. 34.169757°N 85.207443°W
- Campus: Suburban, 200 acres (81 ha)
- Colors: Blue and orange
- Nickname: Chargers
- Sporting affiliations: NJCAA Division I, GCAA
- Mascot: Bolt
- Website: www.highlands.edu
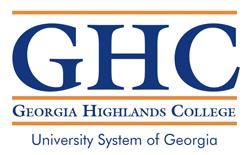

Georgia Highlands College (Georgia Highlands or GHC) is a public college in northwest Georgia. It has locations in Floyd County (near Rome), Cartersville, Marietta, and Dallas and serves the northwest parts of Georgia, as well as parts of east Alabama and southeast Tennessee. A member of the University System of Georgia, the college was originally a community college and has since expanded to also offer bachelor degrees. Between 5,700 and 6,100 students are enrolled at GHC in any given semester, representing 49 different countries. In 2020, the college had a record high number of graduates and an economic impact of over $181 million.

== History ==
Established in 1968 and opened in 1970 as Floyd Junior College, the school was originally named for Floyd County, of which Rome is the county seat, which was in turn named after John Floyd. It was later shortened to just Floyd College in 1987. In April 2005, the Georgia Board of Regents voted to change the school's name, and on August 1, 2005, the institution officially became Georgia Highlands College to reflect the regional nature of the population it serves. The college has expanded its service area by opening new instructional sites in 1994, 2005, 2009, and 2010.

== Academics ==
Georgia Highlands College currently offers associate degrees, and eight bachelor degrees, including Bachelor of Science degrees, and Bachelor of Business Administration degrees. The college provides over twenty associate pathways and bachelor programs entirely online. In 2020, the college completed an academic reorganization from Divisions to Schools within the college.

Georgia Highlands College is accredited by the Southern Association of Colleges and Schools Commission on Colleges. GHC's Associate of Science in Nursing degree and its Bachelor of Science in Nursing degree are accredited by the Accreditation Commission for Education in Nursing (ACEN). The dental hygiene program is accredited by the Commission on Dental Accreditation and the Associate of Science in Nursing is approved by the Georgia Board of Nursing.

=== Faculty ===
In 2016, GHC's full-time faculty was 57% female and 87% white. 73.2% of the GHC faculty was full-time and ranked Assistant, Associate, or full Professor, while 26.8% had the rank of Instructor. As of Fall 2016, 51% of the full-time faculty had tenure, 22% were on track for tenure, and 26.8% were not on the tenure track. All full-time faculty had a master's degree as required by SACS, and 30% additionally had a terminal degree such as a doctorate The full-time faculty to student ratio at GHC is 21:1.

== Campuses ==
Georgia Highlands College offers courses and services at the original campus and at four additional instructional sites.

=== Floyd Campus ===
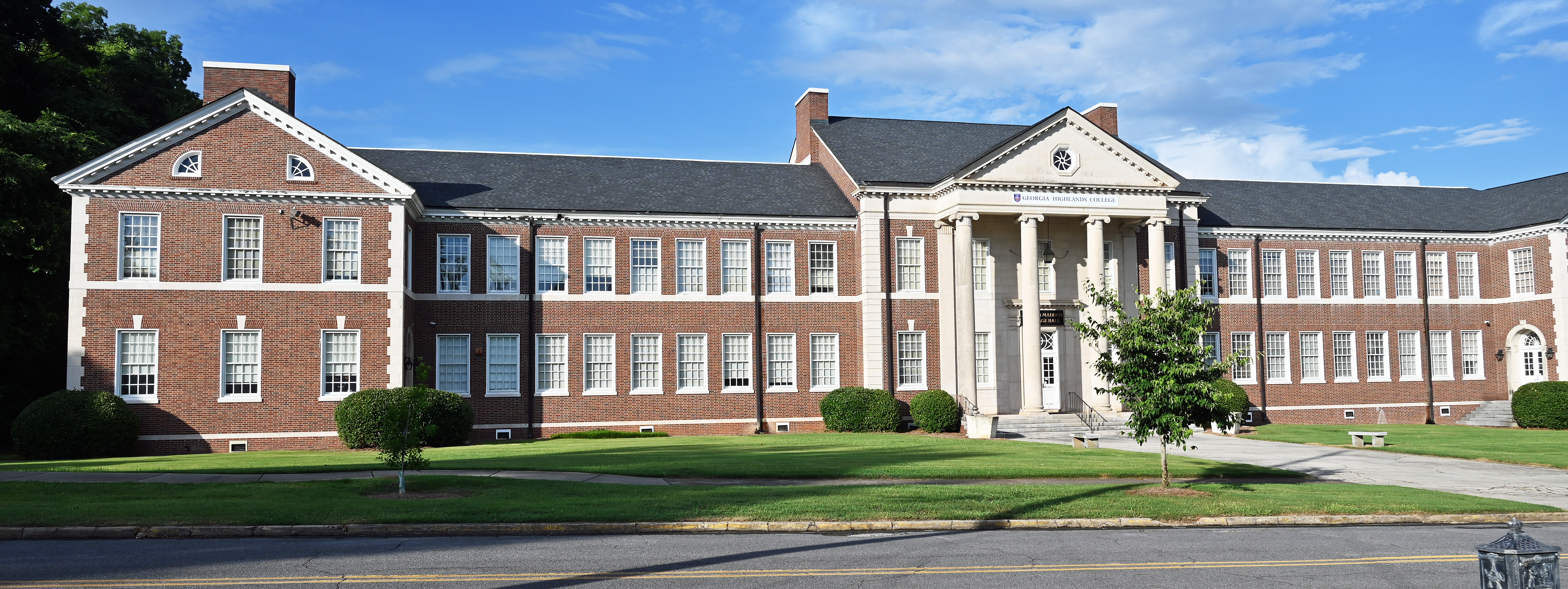
Heritage Hall, 415 E. Third Ave., Rome

GHC was founded as Floyd Junior College in 1970 in Rome, Georgia. The campus includes Bishop Observatory, a library, the Lakeview Auditorium building, the McCorkle and Walraven academic buildings, a tennis court, and fields for soccer, softball, and baseball. This site includes Paris Lake and has access to a 20-acre tract behind the campus that has been set aside as a protected natural wetland ecosystem, which includes a 1,200-foot boardwalk and two observation platforms. In 2015, the Floyd campus began housing a new Georgia Public Safety Training Center (GPSTC), offering training for law enforcement officers.

Off the main campus, in downtown Rome is the college's Heritage Hall.

=== Cartersville Instructional Site ===
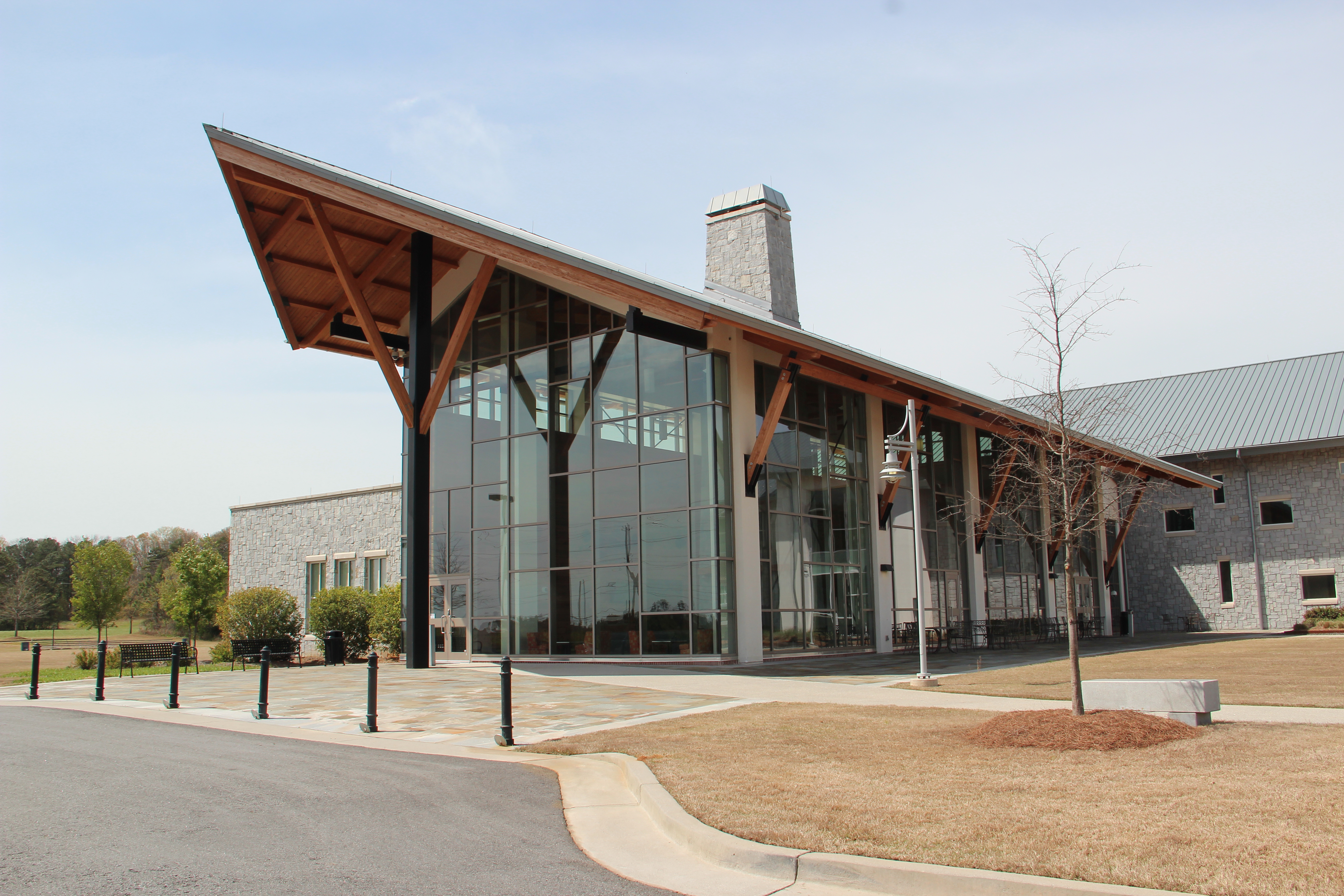
Georgia Highlands Cartersville campus

GHC began offering classes in a small space in downtown Cartersville, Georgia in the 1980s. The current Cartersville location was opened in 2005. The site includes a 55,000-square-foot student center designed with a mountain lodge feel that matches the original classroom building and has a two-story stone fireplace in the open-air student lounge as its centerpiece. Along with the campus bookstore, the center houses a small café, a game room, a weight and cardio room, two volleyball/basketball courts, and a suspended indoor running track.

In 2017, the University System of Georgia approved $17.7 million in funds to construct a new STEAM building at the Cartersville site. The building, which features new classrooms and lab rooms, opened to students in Spring 2019.

=== Heritage Hall Instructional Site ===
The James D. Maddox Heritage Hall Instructional Site, at 415 East Third Avenue in downtown Rome, Georgia, has been in operation by GHC since 1994 and houses the college's Division of Health Sciences nursing and dental hygiene programs. Heritage Hall also houses the GHC Foundation and the Marketing and Communications office. The Certified Nursing Assistant (CNA) program is also housed at the site.

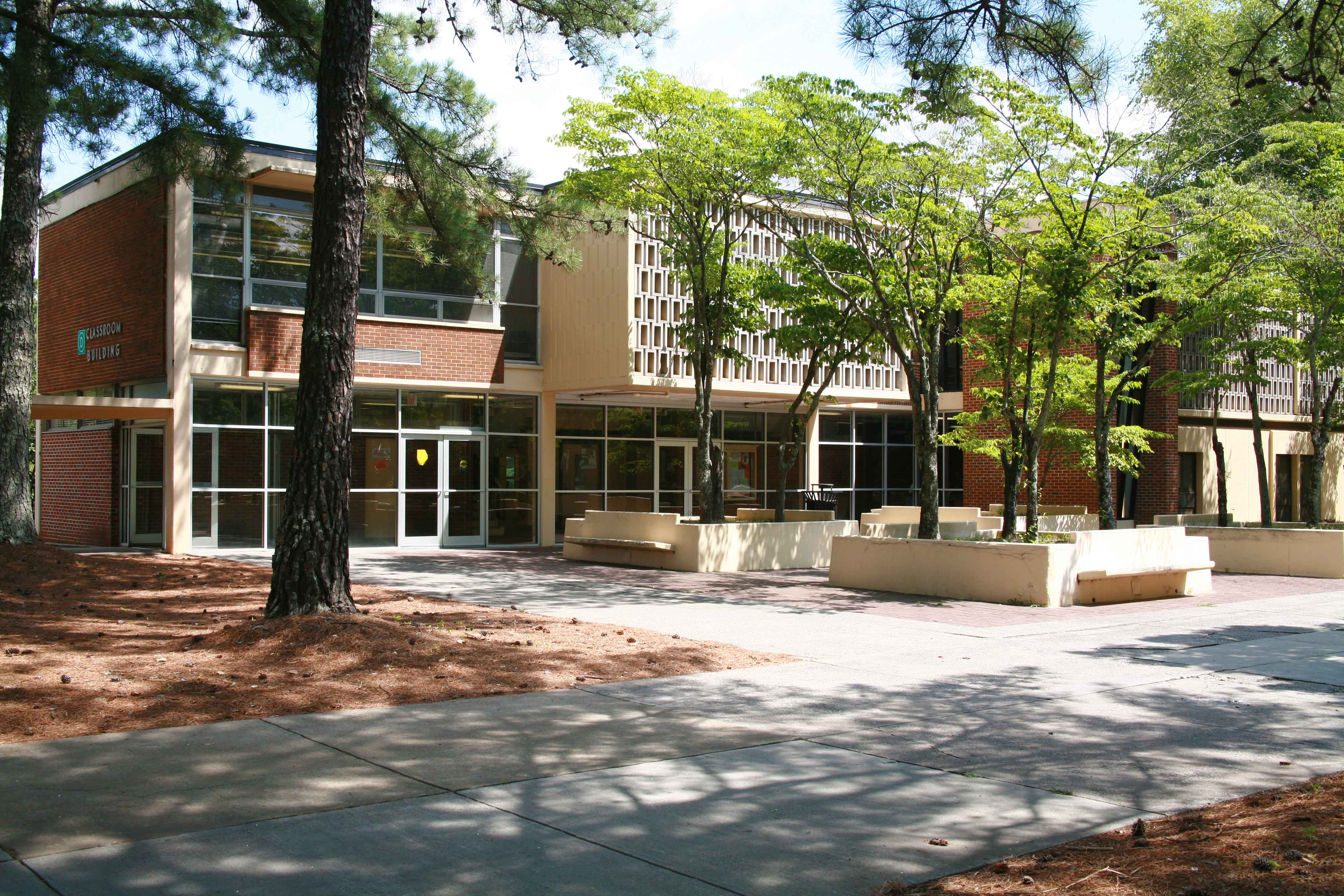
Marietta Site of GHC on the KSU Marietta campus

=== Marietta Instructional Site ===
The Marietta site opened in 2005. This location became GHC's third site, opening for classes on the campus of Southern Polytechnic State University (SPSU) (now Kennesaw State University (KSU)). In 2022, GHC relocated to 1090 Northchase Parkway, Suite 150 in Marietta. The site includes a lab, learning commons, and several classrooms.

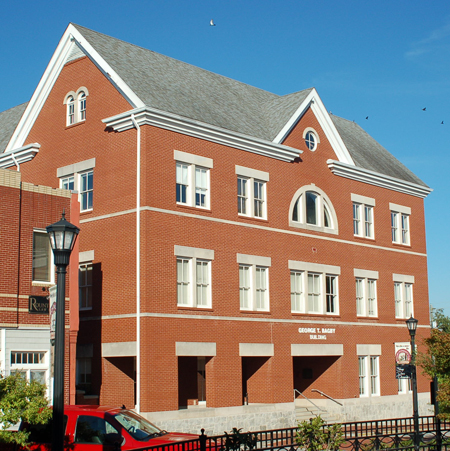
GHC Paulding Site at the Historic Douglas Country Courthouse

=== Paulding Instructional Site ===
The Paulding location in Dallas was opened in 2009. Administrative offices, classrooms, and the library are located in the Bagby building and the Winn building in the Dallas Town Square. Kennesaw State University and GHC have several active partnership programs available at the Paulding site, including degrees in Psychology, Elementary & Early Childhood Education, and Integrative Studies.

In 2018, the University System of Georgia approved $4.1 million in funds to renovate the buildings at the Paulding site. The renovations were to provide space for further course offerings, allowing more complete degrees at the Paulding site.

== Student life ==
Undergraduate demographics as of Fall 2023
Race and ethnicity	Total
White	56%
Hispanic	20%
Black	17%
Two or more races	4%
Asian	1%
International student	1%
Unknown	1%
Economic diversity
Low-income (Note: The percentage of students who received an income-based federal Pell grant intended for low-income students.)	43%
Affluent (Note: The percentage of students who are a part of the American middle class at the bare minimum.)	57%

=== Demographics ===
The student body at Georgia Highlands College is relatively diverse. Over 60% of students are female, and 24% are non-traditional age students (24–65 years old). The median student age is 23. 69% of students are white/Caucasian, 17% are black/African American, and 8% are Hispanic/Latino. GHC has an active veteran cohort of students, and was ranked a “Top School for Veterans” by Military Advanced Education in 2012, and from 2014 to 2018.

=== Clubs and organizations ===
The largest club at the college, Brother 2 Brother (B2B), encourages excellence among minority male students. B2B began as part of the Georgia Highlands African-American & Minority Male Excellence program (GHAME) in 2008. GHC B2B won outstanding chapter of the year several times at the 300+ member national Student African American Brotherhood Conference. GHC's chapter of the national academic organization Phi Theta Kappa (PTK) was recognized as Regional Top Distinguished Chapter Overall in 2016, 2017, and 2018.

The Six Mile Post, GHC's student newspaper, consistently wins awards for student articles, artwork, editing, photography, and advertising at the Southern Regional Press Institute and the Georgia College Press Association. For four decades, the college has published Old Red Kimono, an annual book of student artwork, poetry, and short stories. Since 2010, students at GHC can compete in a public speaking competition funded in part by the Rome Area Council for the Arts.

GHC also offers students business focused clubs such as Business Leaders of Tomorrow and Logistics and Supply Chain Management Association. These business clubs focus on developing relationships between students and local industry leaders as well as developing workforce related skills. The club membership is mainly filled with bachelor level students, but are open to all GHC students on all campuses regardless of major.

Student clubs and GHC Student Support Services began offering food pantry services in partnership with the Atlanta Food Bank in 2017 to students that are food insecure. Since 2005, the college has hosted Foundation Summer Camp, a free service for boys that includes STEAM and athletic activities.

Since 1997, GHC has offered geology field credit for summer trips to Wyoming. GHC partners with KSU to offer semester abroad trips with credit courses in Montepulciano, Italy. GHC regularly offers biology credit trips to Costa Rica and culture/business credit trips to European countries.

== Athletics ==
Georgia Highlands College, nicknamed the Chargers, is a Division I member of the Georgia Collegiate Athletic Association (GCAA) and Region XVII of the National Junior College Athletic Association (NJCAA). Men's sports include basketball and baseball. Women's sports include volleyball, softball, and cross country. The athletics program began play in the 2012-2013 season with men's and women's basketball, and added baseball and softball the following year (2014). Volleyball and cross country were added most recently (2025). The men's basketball team has won Regional Championships in 2015, 2016, and 2017. The women's basketball team won a regional title in 2016 and the women's baseball team won a regional title in 2017. The Charger mascot is named “Bolt”.
