= Balasaheb =

Balasaheb or Bala Saheb is an Indian (Marathi) title or male given name and may refer to:

- Balasaheb, or Hridaynath Mangeshkar (born 1937), Indian singer and composer
- Balasaheb Deoras, or Madhukar Dattatraya Deoras (1915–1996), third Sarsanghchalak (leader) of the Rashtriya Swayamsevak Sangh (RSS)
- Balasaheb Gangadhar Kher, or B. G. Kher, former chief minister of Maharashtra, India
- Balasaheb Thackeray, also known as Bal Thackeray (1926-2012), founder and leader of the political party Shiv Sena
- Balasaheb Vikhe Patil (1932–2016), 14th Lok Sabha member

== See also ==
- Bala (disambiguation)
- Saheb (disambiguation)
- B. R. Ambedkar (1891–1956), known as Babasaheb, Indian jurist, economist, politician and social reformer
- Babasaheb (title)
