= Zaki Mazboudi =

Lebanese politician, lawyer and economist (1920–2000)

Zaki Mazboudi (Arabic: زكي مزبودي; 1920–2000) was a Lebanese politician, lawyer and economist. He served as government minister twice and represented the third constituency of Beirut in the Parliament of Lebanon 1972–1992.

== Education and career ==
He was born in 1920.

Mazboudi studied at the Faculty of Law at Sorbonne. Moreover, he obtained a PhD in Economics from the University of Paris in 1951. Mazboudi worked at the Ministry of Finance between 1948 and 1966. He represented the Lebanese government abroad on multiple occasions; he was a member of Lebanese delegations to the Arab League Economic Council between 1961 and 1965, headed the Lebanese delegation in talks with the French government over a Double Taxation Agreement and in 1963 he negotiated an agreement with the UAR government on Lebanese properties that had been nationalized in Egypt. In 1963 he was included in a committee dedicated to study relations between Lebanon and the European Economic Community. In 1964 he co-founded the Development Studies Association along with Charles Rizk and Hassan Saab; an organization that promoted multi-disciplinary approach to planning issues in Lebanon and was active until 1988.

Between 1966 and 1972 he served as the Secretary General of the Agriculture, Industry and Real Estate Development Bank. As of 1965 he served as General Financial Inspector of the Beirut Municipality.

Mazboudi served on the Makassed Board between 1966 and 1973.

== Entry into politics ==
Mazboudi entered politics in 1968, standing as an independent candidate for one of the Sunni seats in the 1968 Lebanese general election in Beirut III. He was not elected, having obtained 9,396 votes.

He again contested the 1972 Lebanese general election in Beirut III, as a candidate on the list of Saeb Salam. He was elected to parliament, having received 16,489 votes.

== Parliamentarian and minister ==
Mazboudi served as minister of planning 1974–1975. Mazboudi was one of four cabinet ministers that resigned from the government on May 12, 1975, along with Joseph Skaff (Defence), Adel Osseiran (Justice) and Suleiman Ali (Agriculture). In the midst of the Lebanese Civil War, he served as Special Envoy of President Elias Sarkis 1976–1982.

He was a member of the Islamic Gathering, Islamic Encounter, Democratic Parliamentary Front and the Independent Parliamentary Gathering factions in the Lebanese parliament. He took part in the Taif Agreement talks.

Mazboudi served as Minister of National Education and Fine Arts in the 1992 cabinet of Rachid Solh. He lost his parliamentary seat in the 1992 Lebanese general election. Following the election, Mazboudi retired from politics.

Mazboudi died from a heart attack on December 3, 2000.
