= Saheb (disambiguation) =

Saheb or Sahib is an Arabic honorific title.

Saheb or Sahib may also refer to:

== Arts and entertainment ==
- Saheb (1981 film), an Indian Bengali-language sports drama
  - Saaheb, a 1985 Indian Hindi-language remake
- Saheb (2019 film), an Indian Gujarati-language political drama

== People ==
- Saheb Bhattacharya (born 1985), Indian actor
- Saheb Chatterjee (born 1978), Indian actor
- Saheb Ramrao Khandare (born 1962), Indian author
- Sahib Shihab (1925–1989), American saxophonist

== Places ==
- Saheb, Iran
  - Saheb Rural District

== See also ==
- Sahab (disambiguation)
- Sahebganj (disambiguation)
- Sahebabad (disambiguation), or Sahibabad
- Saheba (disambiguation)
- Sahebpur, a town in West Bengal, India
- Sahebpur Kamal, a town in Begusarai district, Bihar, India
- Sahiba Mahal, a Mughal empress
- Sahibaan, a 1993 Indian film
- Sahibi River, in India
- Babasaheb (title), an Indian title
- Balasaheb (disambiguation), an Indian title
- B. R. Ambedkar (1891–1956), known as Babasaheb, Indian jurist, economist, politician and social reformer
