= Honorific titles of Indian figures =

Popular figures of India have often been conferred with an honorific title by fans and followers. These generally include those that are not formally recognised. Many titles were given to various Indian leaders during Indian independence struggle.

== List ==
Honorific	Full Name	Notes	Portrait
Acharya	Vinayak Narahari Bhave	Translates to 'respected teacher'.	Vinoba Bhave
Azaad	Chandra Shekhar Tiwan	"The Freed Soul" (Urdu)	Chandra Shekhar Tiwan
Babasaheb	Bhimrao Ramji Ambedkar	"The Respected Father" (Marathi). "Baba" = "father" and "Saheb" = "sir"	B. R. Ambedkar
Babuji	Jagjivan Ram	A term of respect for one's father	Jagjivan Ram
Bahadur	Sam Hormusji Framji Jamshedji Manekshaw	Meaning 'the Brave'. Bahadur is an honorific title bestowed upon princes and victorious military commanders by Mughal emperors, and later by their British successors.	Sam Manekshaw
Bihar Kesari	Shri Krishna Sinha (Singh)	"Lion of Bihar" ( Hindi/Sanskrit) "Bihar" = "Bihar state" and "Kesari" = "Lion"	Shri Krishna Sinha (Singh)
Bihar Vibhuti	Anugrah Narayan Sinha	"Gem of Bihar" (Hindi). "Bihar" = "Bihar state" and "Vibhuti" = "Gem"	Anugrah Narayan Sinha
Buddha	Gautama	In Buddhism, means 'awakened one'	The Buddha
Deen Bandhu	Charles Freer Andrews	"Friend of the Poor" (Bengali). "Deen" = "poor" and "Bandhu" = "friend".	Charles Freer Andrews
Desh Bandhu	Chittaranjan Das	"Friend of country" (Bengali). "Desh" = "country" and "Bandhu" = "friend".	Chittaranjan Das
Desh Nayak Netaji	Subhash Chandra Bose	"Leader of the country" (Bengali) (Hindi). "Desh" = "country" and "Nayak" = "Leader". "Respected leader" (Bengali) (Hindi). "Neta" = "leader" and "ji" = an honorary title.	Subhas Chandra Bose
Desh Ratna	Rajendra Prasad	"Jewel of the Country" (Hindi). "Desh" = "country" and "Ratna" = "jewel"	Rajendra Prasad, Former President of the Republic of India
Fakhr-e-Afghan	Abdul Ghaffār Khān	فخرِ افغان, 'Pride of Afghans'	Abdul Ghaffar Khan
Gurudev Kobiguru Biswakobi The Bard of Bengal	Rabindranath Tagore	"Supreme teacher" (Bengali) (Hindi). "Guru" = "teacher" and "dev" = "Respected person".	Rabindranath Tagore
Guruji	Madhavrao Sadashivrao Golwalkar	Hindi for 'respected teacher'	M. S. Golwalkar
Karnataka Kulapurohita	Aluru Venkata Rao	Translation - "High priest of the Kannada family"	Aluru Venkata Rao
Lokmanya	Bal Gangadhar Tilak	"Revered by the people" (Hindi). "Lok" = "people" and "manya" = "Revered".	Bal Gangadhar Tilak
Loknayak	Jayaprakash Narayan	"Leader of the people" (Hindi). "Lok" = "people" and "nayak" = "leader".	
Mahamana	Madan Mohan Malaviya	"One with greatest thoughts" (Hindi). "Mahan" = "great" and "Mann" = "thought/heart"	
Mahatma /Bapuji	Mohandas Karamchand Gandhi	Sanskrit for 'great soul'. In popular usage ever since Rabindranath Tagore used it to refer to him.	Mahatma Gandhi
Mahatma	Jotirao Govindrao Phule	"Great Soul" (Sanskrit). "Maha" = "great" and "atma" = "soul".	Mahatma Jotirao Phule
Maulana	Abul Kalam Azad	"Our lord" (Arabic).	Abul Kalam Azad
Mootharignar	Chakravarti Rajagopalachari	Tamil for "the Scholar Emeritus", for his scholarly contribution to the Tamil literature.	C. Rajagopalachari
Nata Saarvabhouma	Singanalluru Puttaswamaiah Muthuraj	Kannada for 'Emperor of Actors'. Revered as so by the people of Karnataka.	Dr.. Rajkumar
Pandit / Chacha	Jawaharlal Nehru	Sanskrit for "learned man". Originally meant exclusively for a man expert in Hindu law and literature.	Jawaharlal Nehru
Punjab Kesari	Lala Lajpat Rai	"Lion of Punjab" ( Hindi/Sanskrit) "Punjab" = "Punjab state" and "Kesari" = "Lion"	Lala Lajpat Rai
Raja	Ram Mohan Roy	Translates to 'king' in most Indian languages. Conferred upon by Akbar II.	Ram Mohan Roy
Sadhguru	Jagadish Vasudev	"Sadhguru", alternatively spelt "sadguru", means "real or true guru". The term has also been translated as "senior sadhu; eminent preceptor".	Jaggi Vasudev
Sardar	Vallabhbhai Jhaverbhai Patel	Persian for "leader or chief". Conferred upon by his long-time mentor Mahatma Gandhi after the Bardoli Satyagraha.	Vallabhbhai Patel
Shaheed e Azam	Bhagat Singh	"Great martyr" (Urdu). "Shaheed" = "martyr" and "Azam" = "Principal".	Shaheed e Azam
Veer	Vinayak Damodar Savarkar	Hindustani for "the brave". Popularly used by followers; now a part of popular culture.	Vinayak Damodar Savarkar
