= Dadasaheb =

Dadasaheb is an honorary title and given name.

Dadasaheb may refer to:

- Dadasaheb Gaikwad (1902–1971), Indian politician and social worker
- Dadasaheb Khaparde (1854–1938), Indian independence activist
- Dadasaheb Phalke (1870–1944), Indian filmmaker known as the Father of Indian cinema
- Dadasaheb Rupwate (1925–1999), Indian politician
- Dadasaheb Torne (1890–1960), Indian film director and producer
- Ganesh Vasudev Mavalankar (1888–1956), Indian politician
- Khashaba Dadasaheb Jadhav (1926–1984), Indian athlete

== See also ==
- Babasaheb (title)
