= Sabb =

SABB may refer to:

- SABB (Saudi bank) or Saudi British Bank, a subsidiary of HSBC
- SABB S.A., an Argentine rolling stock manufacturer.

Sabb may refer to:

- Sabbatical officer or sabb, in UK students' unions
- Sabb., an abbreviation related to the Moed
- Sabb Motor, Norwegian company making small marine diesel engines

== People with the surname ==
- Dwayne Sabb (born 1969), American football player
- Keon Sabb (born 2002), American football player
- Ronnie A. Sabb (born 1958), American politician from California
