= SAB =

SAB, or Sab, may refer to:

== Businesses ==
- The School of American Ballet in New York City
- South African Breweries
- Shipping Association of Barbados
- Société Aérienne Bordelaise a French aircraft manufacturer
- Development Bank of Saxony, from the acronym of its German name, Sächsische Aufbaubank

== Literature ==
- Sab (novel), by Gertrudis Gomez de Avellaneda

== Transport ==
- Sabena (ICAO code), a defunct Belgian airline
- St Albans railway station, Melbourne
- Smallbrook Junction railway station (National Rail code) on the Isle of Wight, UK
- Juancho E. Yrausquin Airport (IATA code), Saba, Dutch Caribbean
- Anse-à-l'Orme station, a Réseau express métropolitain station known as Sainte-Anne-de-Bellevue during development

== Others ==
- Sony SAB, Indian television channel
- Sab The Artist aka Musab, an American recording artist
- Surinaamse Atletiek Bond, the Suriname Athletics Federation
- Sociedade Astronômica Brasileira
- Steal a Brainrot, 2025 video game on Roblox
- Abbreviation for Sabbath mode used on several devices

== See also ==
- Saab
