= 1968 Lebanese general election in Beirut III =

Voting to elect five members of the Lebanese parliament took place in the Beirut III district (one of three electoral districts in the city) on March 24, 1968, part of the national general election of that year. The constituency had 75,296 eligible voters, out of whom 30,713 voted.

In Beirut III, consisting of the predominantly Muslim part of the city, had 4 Sunni Muslim seats and 1 Greek Orthodox seat (for more information about the Lebanese election system, see Elections in Lebanon).

== Beiruti Bloc ==
The main force in the election was the Beiruti Bloc, a coalition of five candidates running on a joint ticket; Abdallah al-Yafi (incumbent Prime Minister, who had taken over for an interim administration to oversee the holding of the elections in February 1968, following Rachid Karami's resignation), Saeb Salam (former prime minister, chairman of the board of Middle East Airlines), Uthman ad-Dana (judge and chairman of the National Labour Movement), Rachid Solh (lawyer by profession) and Nasim Majdalani (candidate for the Greek Orthodox seat). The Beiruti Bloc was the only multi-candidate ticket in the fray in this constituency. Solh, Salam, Majdalani and ad-Dana were incumbent parliamentarians at the time of the election. All of the five candidates, except Solh, were elected. Notably al-Yafi and Salam were rivals for the post of Prime Minister, and had fought each other in previous elections.

== Other candidates ==
The only candidate outside the Beiruti Bloc who got elected was Shafik Wazzan, a lawyer and former leader of the National Front. Wazzan defeated Solh by a margin of merely 20 votes. Notably in the 1964 election the situation had been the opposite, with Solh defeating Wazzan by a slim margin. There were five other Sunni Muslim candidates.

There were three challengers for the Greek Orthodox seat; Edward Hanna, Dib Fallah and the journalist Jubran Akkawi.

== Violence ==
The previous election had been marred with violence in Beirut III. This election also saw some violent incidents. For example, Khalil Shihabuddin was accused of having broken into a house to vandalize al-Yafi hung portraits on its balconies. The incident prompted al-Yafi supporters to counter-mobilize.

== Voting ==
In the early hours, few voters went to the polling stations. As the day went on, more and more people cast their votes. An interpretation was that voters were waiting to get approached by the different candidates and bribed.

== Results ==
Candidate	Votes
Abdallah al-Yafi	16,936
Uthman ad-Dana	12,872
Saeb Salam	12,319
Shafik Wazzan	11,815
Rachid Solh	11,795
Nasim Majdalani	10,244
Zaki Mazboudi	9,396
Abdurrazzaq Dughan	5,480
Dib Fallah	3,423
Wafiq al-Ajuz	2,047
Edward Hanna	1,810
Jubran Akkawi	1,106
Khayruddin Tabbarah	600
