= Kuppaghat =

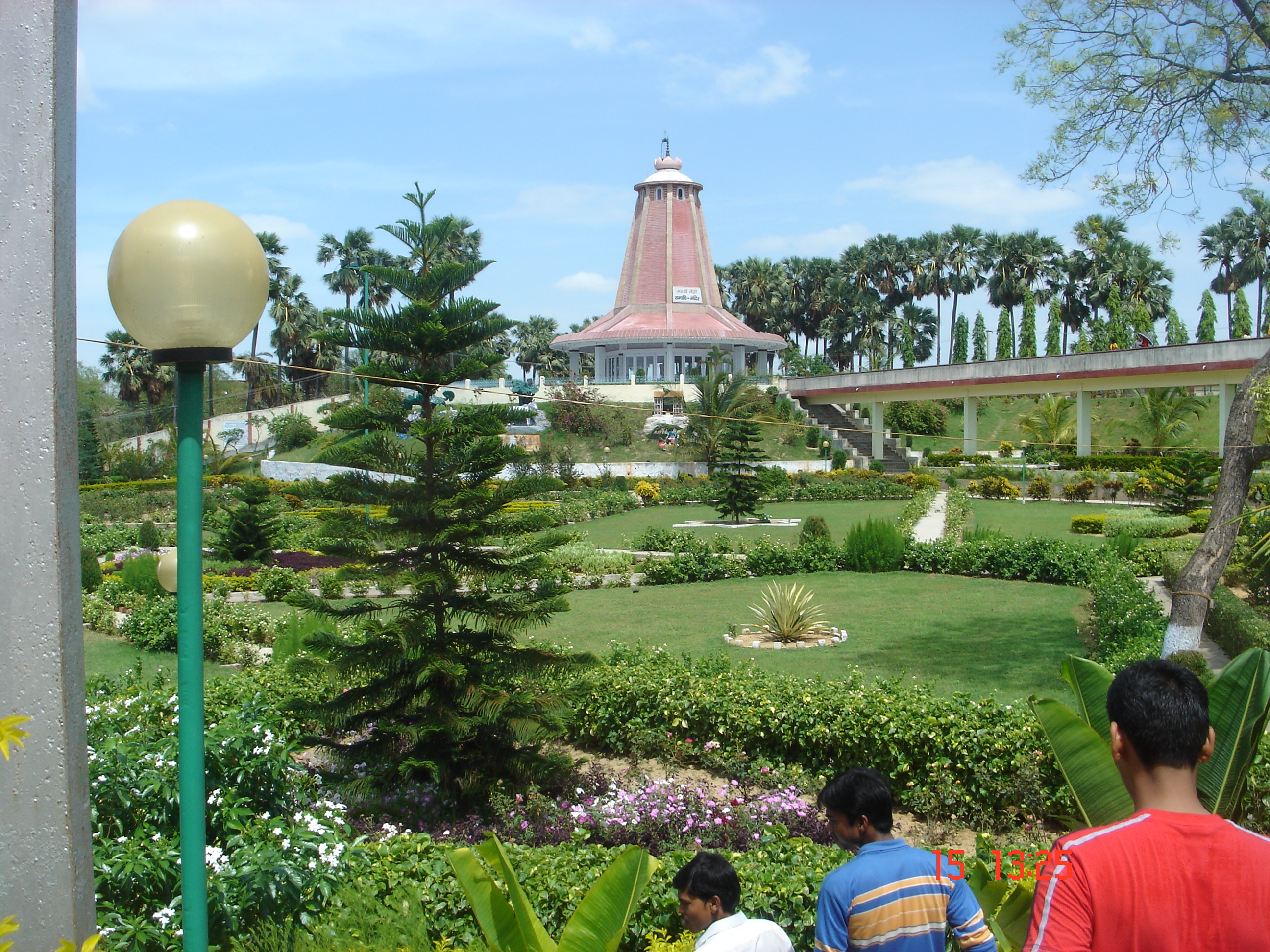
Lawns at the Maharshi Mehi Ashram, Kuppaghat

Kuppa Ghat (Hindi: कुप्पाघाट, which signifies a "large number of tunnels") is a place located on the banks of the holy river Ganges at Bhagalpur, Bihar, India. According to legends and mythology the great Maharshi Mehi Paramhans spent nearly 18 months in the caves. People who follow Maharshi Mehi Paramhans visits this place on his birth anniversary.
