= Lubrication =

Presence of a material to reduce friction between two surfaces

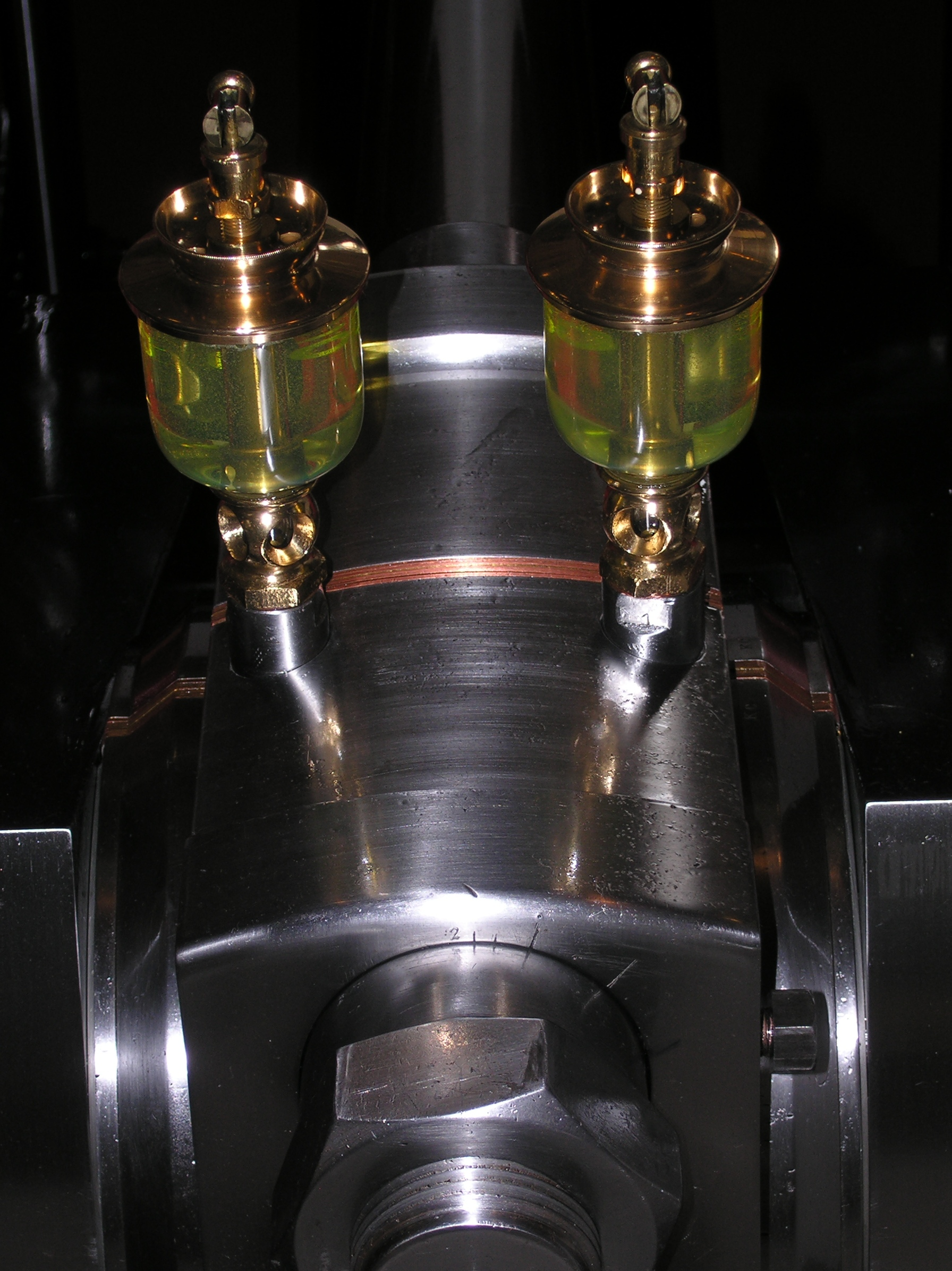
Lubrication of a ship's steam engine crankshaft. The two bottles of lubricant are attached to the piston and move while the engine is operating.

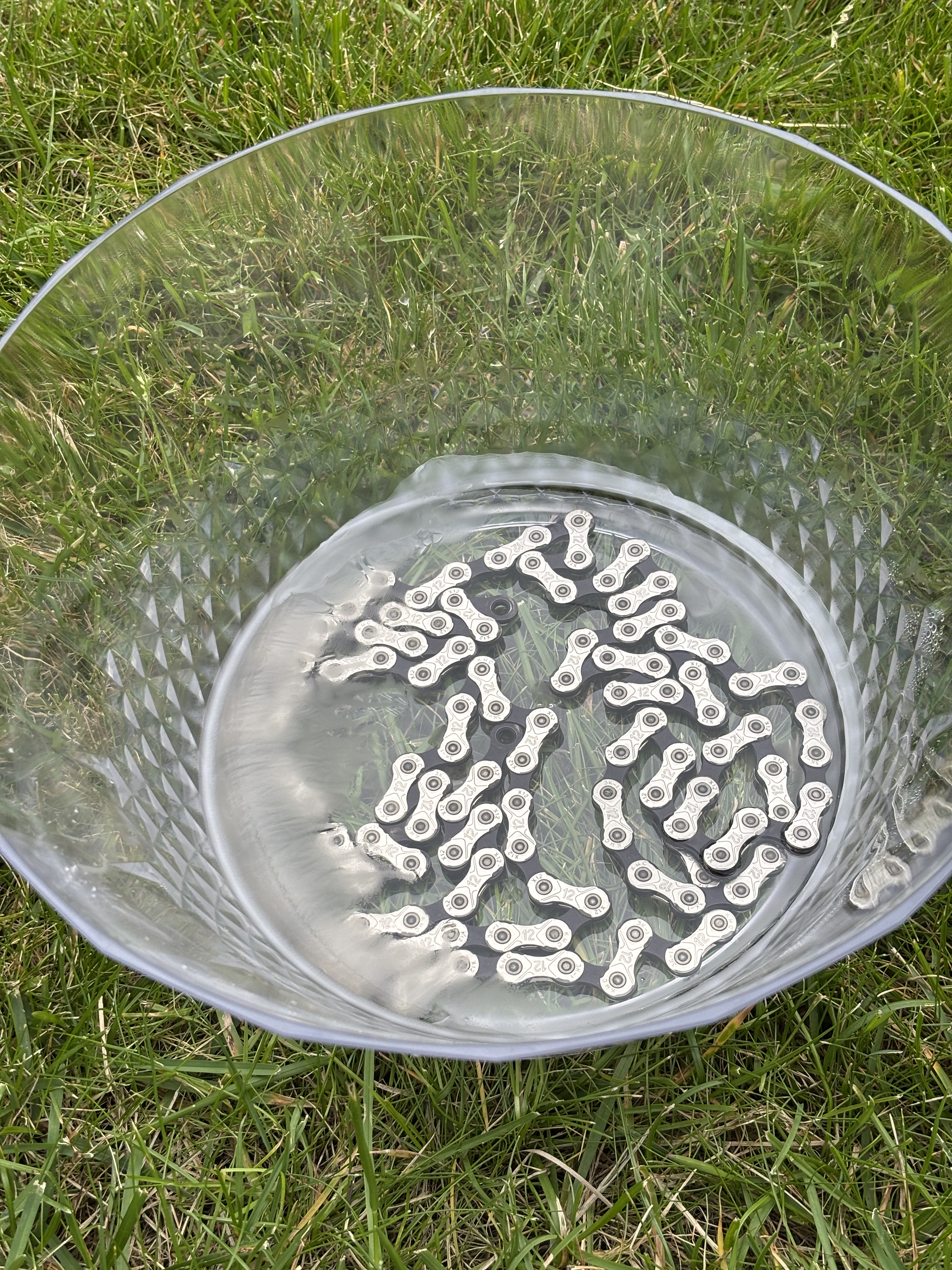
Bicycle chain laying in melted pure paraffin wax without additives, which has gained popularity as a bicycle chain lubrication since around 2020

Lubrication is the process or technique of using a lubricant to reduce friction and wear and tear in a contact between two surfaces. The study of lubrication is a discipline in the field of tribology.

Lubrication mechanisms such as fluid-lubricated systems are designed so that the applied load is partially or completely carried by hydrodynamic or hydrostatic pressure, which reduces solid body interactions (and consequently friction and wear). Depending on the degree of surface separation, different lubrication regimes can be distinguished.

Adequate lubrication allows smooth, continuous operation of machine elements, reduces the rate of wear, and prevents excessive stresses or seizures at bearings. By repelling water and other substances, it also reduces corrosion. When lubrication breaks down, components can rub destructively against each other, causing heat, local welding, destructive damage and failure.

== Mechanisms ==
=== Fluid-lubricated systems ===
As the load increases on the contacting surfaces, distinct situations can be observed with respect to the mode of lubrication, which are called lubrication regimes:

- Fluid film lubrication is the lubrication regime in which, through viscous forces, the load is fully supported by the lubricant within the space or gap between the parts in motion.
  - In hydrostatic lubrication, external pressure is applied to the lubricant in the bearing to maintain the fluid lubricant film where it would otherwise be squeezed out.
  - In hydrodynamic lubrication, the motion of the contacting surfaces, in combination with the bearing design, pump lubricant around the bearing to maintain the lubricating film. This design of bearing may wear when started, stopped or reversed, as the lubricant film breaks down. The basis of the hydrodynamic theory of lubrication is the Reynolds equation. The governing equations of the hydrodynamic theory of lubrication and some analytical solutions can be found in the reference.
- Elastohydrodynamic lubrication: Mostly for nonconforming surfaces or higher load conditions, the bodies suffer elastic strains at the contact. Such strain creates a load-bearing area, which provides an almost parallel gap for the fluid to flow through. Much as in hydrodynamic lubrication, the motion of the contacting bodies generates a flow induced pressure, which acts as the bearing force over the contact area. In such high pressure regimes, the viscosity of the fluid may rise considerably. At full film elastohydrodynamic lubrication, the generated lubricant film completely separates the surfaces. Due to the strong coupling between lubricant hydrodynamic action and the elastic deformation in contacting solids, this regime of lubrication is an example of fluid–structure interaction. The classical elastohydrodynamic theory considers Reynolds equation and the elastic deflection equation to solve for the pressure and deformation in this lubrication regime. Contact between raised solid features, or asperities, can also occur, leading to a mixed-lubrication or boundary lubrication regime.
- Boundary lubrication is defined as the regime in which the load is carried by the surface asperities (high points) rather than by the lubricant. This is the effect that makes ultra-high-molecular-weight polyethylene "self-lubricating".
- Boundary film lubrication: The hydrodynamic effects are negligible. The bodies come into closer contact at their asperities (high points); the heat developed by the local pressures causes a condition which is called stick-slip, and some asperities break off. At the elevated temperature and pressure conditions, chemically reactive constituents of the lubricant react with the contact surface, forming a highly resistant tenacious layer or film on the moving solid surfaces (boundary film) which is capable of supporting the load and major wear or breakdown is avoided.
- Mixed lubrication: This regime is in between the full film elastohydrodynamic and boundary lubrication regimes. The generated lubricant film is not enough to separate the bodies completely, but hydrodynamic effects are considerable.

Besides supporting the load the lubricant may have to perform other functions as well, for instance it may cool the contact areas and remove wear products. While carrying out these functions the lubricant is constantly replaced from the contact areas either by the relative movement (hydrodynamics) or by externally induced forces.

Lubrication is required for correct operation of mechanical systems such as pistons, pumps, cams, bearings, turbines, gears, roller chains, and cutting tools. Without lubrication, the pressure between the surfaces in proximity would generate enough heat for rapid surface damage which, in a coarsened condition, could literally weld the surfaces together, causing seizure.

In some applications, such as piston engines, the film between the piston and the cylinder wall also seals the combustion chamber, preventing combustion gases from escaping into the crankcase.

If an engine required pressurised lubrication to, say, plain bearings, there would be an oil pump and an oil filter. On early engines (such as a Sabb marine diesel), where pressurised feed was not required splash lubrication would suffice.

== See also ==
- Automatic lubricator – Device fitted to a steam engine to supply lubricating oil.
- Automatic lubrication system – A system that delivers controlled amounts of lubricant to multiple locations on a machine while the machine is operating.
