= Sahebganj (disambiguation) =

Sahebganj is a town in Jharkhand, India.

Sahebganj or Sahibganj may also refer to the following places:

== India ==
=== Jharkhand ===
- Sahebganj district, containing the town of Sahebganj
  - Sahibganj subdivision
    - Sahibganj (community development block)
  - Sahibganj Junction railway station, in the town

=== Bihar ===
- Sahebganj (community development block), Muzaffarpur
  - Sahebganj Assembly constituency

=== West Bengal ===
- Sahebganj, Cooch Behar
- Sahebganj, Paschim Bardhaman

== Nepal ==
- Sahebganj, Nepal

== See also ==
- Saheb (disambiguation)
- Ganj (disambiguation)
