= Maharshi Mehi Paramhans =

Indian Guru (1885–1986)

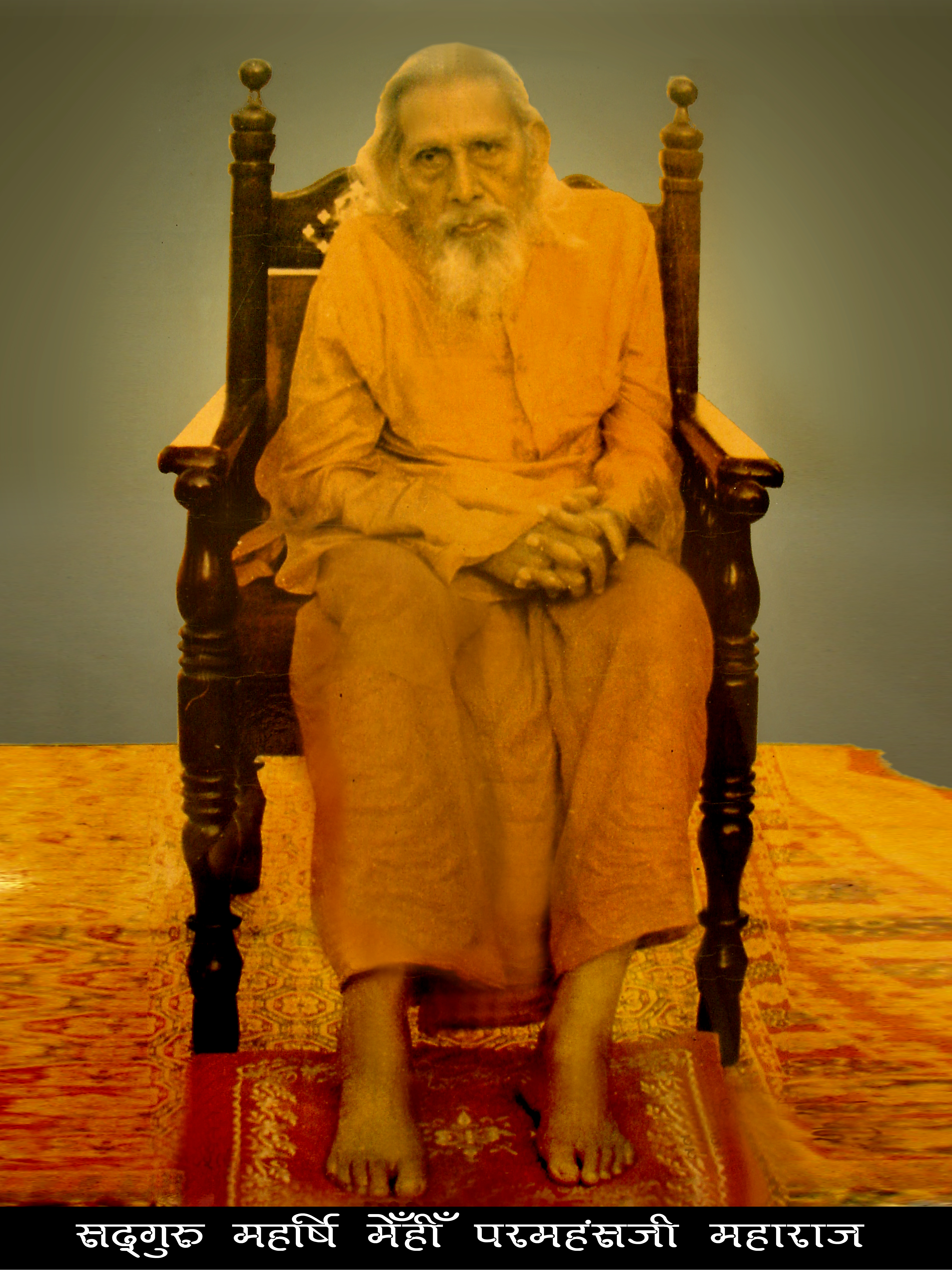
- Born: Ramanugrah Lal Das; 28 April 1885; Khokhsi Shyam, Saharsa District, British India
- Died: 8 June 1986 (aged 101); Bhagalpur, British India
- Resting place: Kuppaghat, Bhagalpur, Bihar, India
- Other names: Mehi Das, Gurumaharaj,Ramanughrah Lal Das
- Known for: Guru of Sant Mat Propounding the philosophy of the Santmat and Advaita Vedanta schools of Hinduism. His main motto: "The utmost & the most solemn goal of human birth is to attain, forsaking all worldly desires, complete liberation of all transmigration. The purpose of Santmat is to provide a system which fulfills the desire of attaining absolute Peace or total liberation."
- Successor: महर्षि संतसेवी परमहंस

Maharshi Mehi Paramhans was a sant in the tradition of Sant Mat. He succeeded Revd Baba Devi Sahab of Muradabad, U.P. India as the guru of Santmat tradition. Based on a study of Vedas, Upanishads, the Bhagavad Gita, the Bible, different sutras of Buddhism, the Quran, literature of various other sages, he demonstrated that the essential teaching contained in all of these is one and the same.

In 2026 Maharshi's Mehi Paramhans's 142nd Jayanti (Birthday) will be celebrated on Thursday, 30th April 2026.

Being a syncretist monk he bridged the wide chasm that existed then between the sacred scriptures and sants or saintly literature by compiling a book called 'Satsang Yoga (Volume I-IV)' in which he quoted from scriptures like Vedas, Upanishads, Puranas, Bhagvad Gita, the Mahabharata etc., sayings & compositions of various sants like Kabir, Nanak, Dadu Dayal Ji etc., views of modern spiritual thinkers and his own wisdom arising out of meditational experiences and he made a proclamation that the scriptures and saints are in unison and that any view to the contrary is unfounded and worthy of rejection.

He taught a way of i) regularly practicing inner meditation, ii) regularly attending Satsang (spiritual company or gatherings), and iii) leading a self-reliant and righteous living to attain 'Moksha' or liberation from all kinds of worldly woes and shackles of the transmigratory cycle that leads to compulsory deaths and rebirths. Mehi was a direct disciple of Baba Devi Sahab of Moradabad, Uttar Pradesh.

Eminent chronicler and Hindi litterateur, Acharya Parashuram Chaturvedi in his monumental book "उत्तरी भारत की संत-परंपरा" (Tradition of Sants (Sages) of Northern India) writes, "Paramhans Mehi's spiritual views align very closely with those of other sants like Sant Kabir Sahab etc. However, one major difference is that while earlier sants in their discourses and works would narrate their own experiences along with references to the sayings of the other sages, Maharshi Mehi, in addition (apart from referring to other sages' works), would support his teachings with quotes from Upanishads as well. He always strived to prove whatever he said or wrote with authentic references to sayings of sants and scriptures. Besides, he tried to explain his thoughts clearly and logically, as much as possible."

Another research scholar Dr Arti Smit, Delhi has referred, in an article of hers available online, to Maharshi Mehi as one of those who have thrown light on the life and works of Sant Tulsi Sahab, Hathras, U.P., India.

Kerin Webb has also acknowledged the contribution of Maharshi Mehi Paramhans to the evolution of Santmat: "The origins of Sant Mat can be traced back to the 13th century with the teachings of the great saint Kabir, who emphasised the inner experience of God rather than mere ritualistic worship. Over the centuries, various saints and mystics have contributed to the evolution of Sant Mat, including Guru Nanak, the founder of Sikhism, and later figures such as Maharshi Mehi Paramhans and Sant Kirpal Singh."

== Early life ==
Maharishi Mehi was born in the village of Khokhshi Shyam in Bihar, India on Tuesday, 28 April 1885. He was named at birth Ramanugrah Lal Das. Later he was given the name "Mehi," which means sharp or subtle. When he was four years of age, his mother died. Thereafter, Mehi Das was mainly raised by his elder sister named Jhulan Dai and his father.

Mehi spent many years meditating at different places starting with Sikligarh Dharahra, Banmankhi, his paternal village, at an ashram located in Manihari of the Katihar district, at Parbatti, Bhagalpur and lastly at the Kuppaghat Ashram located on the banks of the holy river Ganga, Bhagalpur, where he is said to have fully accomplished his inner meditation. Kuppaghat Ashram at Bhagalpur, Bihar eventually turned out to be the headquarters of All India Santmat Satsang.

== Life ==
His grandmother's home was in Sikli Garh Dharahara, Banmankhi, in the Purnia district. His father was Babujan Lal Das. The family astrologer named him Ramanugrah Lal Das, a name based on his astrological charts. This name is also recorded in Mehi's school records. His uncle, however, called him by the name 'Mehi' which means lean and thin and also sharp or subtle. About two decades later when Ramanugrah Lal Das came into contact with his last spiritual guru, Baba Devi Sahab, the latter, impressed by his sharp intellect, also started calling him "Mehi"; thus, he came to be known to the world as Mehi.

Mehi's mother, Janakwati Devi, died when he was four years old. His elder sister, Jhulan Dai(झूलन दाय) was kind to him and she and his father took good care of him. He was admitted to the village school when he turned eight. At this school, learning was imparted in the local Kaithi script. At home, he saw his father reciting regularly from the epic the Ramcharitmanas composed by the poet Sant Goswami Tulsidas Ji. His father used to get emotional while reciting and at times burst into tears. This made Mehi curious to know the contents of the epic. As the epic was printed in the Devanagari script he could not read it at first. However, he labored to correlate the alphabets of Devanagri from those of Kaithi and soon he could learn Devanagri script as well. The Ramcharitmanas left an impact on his mind and several of its quartets and couplets became known to him by heart. He also learned English, Urdu, and Persian languages at secondary school.

In his childhood days, Maharshi Mehi Paramhans was a worshipper of Shiva, but his method of worshipping was unique, he would drive a nail into the ground, make it an offering of water and then sit in its front in meditation. As a teenager, he was a good soccer player. Impressed with his skills at dabbling the ball, his friends made him the team captain. However, soon he began to lose interest in playing as well as formal studies even as he developed a fondness for the study of religious scriptures like the Sukhsagar and the Mahabharat apart from the Ramcharitmanas. He would often retire into solitude while his friends were busy playing to study these books. His disinterest in schooling and formal studies continued growing and reached its peak on 4 July 1904. Half-yearly exams of Class X were on and it was the second paper – English. The first question read: "Quote from memory the poem ‘Builders’ and explain it in your own English." Answering the question, he quoted the first four lines, as reproduced below, and began to explain these. The lines of the poem were:

"For the structure that we raise,
time is with material's field,
our todays and yesterdays,
are the blocks with which we build." - Maharshi Mehi

While explaining the central message of the above lines he got overwhelmed with such a strong surge of the emotion of renunciation that he stood up and asked the invigilator, "May I go out, Sir?" Thinking that he wanted to go to toilet, the invigilator granted permission but little did he know that this young lad was not merely going out of the examination hall briefly but had decided to bid adieu to the very household life for good. In fact, Mehi had made already three unsuccessful attempts to flee home, but this time he was determined and he was never to look back again.

== Gurus ==
Baba Devi Sahab was the main spiritual Guru of Mehi. However, before he met Baba Devi Sahab, his yearning for emancipation led him to three other gurus (spiritual teachers). "After a lot of wandering search I found my Guru at Moradabad”. (Padavali, linked in the Literature section below, containing numerous references to Baba Devi Sahab of Moradabad)

Per family tradition, Mehi was initiated by Mr. Ram Jha, a Brahmin priest from Darbhanga district of the state of Bihar, in 1902. Mr. Jha was a worshipper of Lord Shiva and Mother Goddess Kali and was fond of hunting. He, in his later years, lost his eyesight and just had a feeling that this (loss of vision) was the consequence of his previous acts of killing birds and animals. He, therefore, preached Mehi never to commit violence.

Ramanand Swami, a sadhu of Dariyapanth (a sect named after Sant Dariya Sahab of Bihar), was Mehi's second guru. Ramanand Swami taught Mehi to practice 'Manas Jap' (internally chanting or repeatedly reciting a sacred mantra), 'Manas Dhyan' (trying to concentrate internally on the form of a sacred deity or Guru) and 'Bahya Drishti Sadahan' (stilling gaze at a target in the outside, not within ). However, through a study of saintly literature and relevant spiritual scriptures Mehi had come to realize that the knowledge of sound/word meditation (Surat Shabda Yoga) was a must for total liberation – a domain Ramanand Swami was not conversant with. Curious questioning about the 'sara shabda' (Quintessential Unstruck Sound) by Mehi often irritated or even infuriated his guru Ramanand Swami Ji which left Mehi dissatisfied and convinced that he would have to find another suitable guru. He, thus, remained restless and on the lookout for a complete Guru. He would rush to several places wherever he heard of the possibility of seeing a person who could guide him in sound meditation.

In his search he was led to a disciple of Baba Devi Sahab named Mr. Dhiraj Lal from Jotramrai, the same village where Mehi had been staying in attendance upon Ramanand Swami. Mehi was satisfied with the clarifications offered by Mr. Dhiraj Lal on many topics that had been puzzling Mehi for a long time. It was difficult to find free time during the day for he had to attend to various duties instructed by his erstwhile guru. So, after getting free from his duties towards Ramanand Swami Ji in the night he would approach Mr. Dhiraj Lal and the two had discussions from midnight to about 3 AM and this went on for about three months (May – July 1909) till Mehi became convinced that he had landed in the right spot and that Baba Devi Sahab was indeed the true Guru he had been looking for.

However, since Baba Devi Sahab lived at Moradabad of U.P., Mr. Dhiraj Lal advised Mehi to approach, in the meanwhile, and have initiation from Mr. Rajendra Nath Singh of Bhagalpur, a place that was nearer. Mr. Rajendra Nath, an initiate of Baba Devi Sahab, was an advocate by profession. He had some preliminary discussions with Mehi and saw in him a genuine seeker thirsting for freedom from the bondage of BMI (Body-Mind-Intellect-Ego Complex). He gave initiation to Mehi, teaching him the art of 'drishti sadhan' (the Yoga of Inner Light – a technique to still one's gaze in the inner sky in front of the center of the two eyes, called variously as the Sushumna, Sukhamana, the Ajna Chakra, the Third Eye, the Tenth Door, the Shiva Netra etc.) aimed at transcending the gross sphere, the realm of darkness and, thus, moving into the realm of light, the astral plane. As Mehi tried to touch Mr. Rajendra Nath's feet in reverence, the latter stopped him and told, "Look, I am not your Guru. I have only explained you the method as authorised by Sadguru Baba Devi Sahab. Baba Devi Sahab, not I, is your Guru." Mehi replied, "Yes, of course, he is my Guru and your Guru also, but since you have taught me this (drishti Sadahn), you are also like my Guru." Thus, Mr. Rajendra Nath Singh may be treated to be his third Guru.

After having been initiated into Sant Mat and becoming satisfied, Mehi, as advised by his friends, returned to where his father (who became ecstatic to see his son back home) lived and waited to see Baba Devi Sahab. The occasion finally came during the festival of Dashahara (celebrated generally in October) when Baba Devi Sahab arrived at Bhagalpur. When Mr. Dhiraj Lal informed Mehi of the programme of Baba Devi Sahab's visit to Bhagalpur, Mehi was interested and rushed to see his Guru. It was on the day of Vijayadashami in 1909 that he got to have his first glimpse of his Guru.

== Literature ==
List of Books Authored by or About Maharshi Mehi Paramhans:

- Moksha Darshan (Philosophy of Liberation), Translated into English from Hindi by Professor Veena Howard, University of Oregon Eugene
- Excerpt of the Biography of Maharshi Mehi in English
- Santmat-Siddhant aur Guru-Kirtan
- Satsang Yoga (Part I – IV)
- Ramcharitmanas Sar Sateek
- Vinay-Patrika Sar Sateek
- Bhavarth-Sahit Ghat Ramayan Padavali
- Padavali (Hymns) of Maharshi Mehi
- Satsang Sudha, Part I
- Satsang Sudha, Part II
- Shri Gita Yoga Prakash
- Veda Darshan Yoga
- Ishwara Swaroop aur Usaki Prapti
- Santvani Sateek
- Jnana Yoga Yukta Ishwara Bhakti
- Also see, The Modern Monastic Santmat Movement of Bihar: building bridges between Sanātana Dharma and Sant-Mat, by Prof. Veena Howard — published in the International Journal of Dharma Studies
- Paper: Divine Light and Melodies Lead the Way: The Santmat Tradition of Bihar, by Prof. Veena Howard, a ResearchGate Publication
- Experiential Knowledge, by Maharshi Mehi, collection of discourses compiled from the magazine "Shanti-Sandesh" translated from Hindi into English in 2025
