= Sahab Geographic and Drafting Institute =

Geographical and cartographical institute

Coordinates: 35°42′17.72″N 51°25′49.41″E

Sahab Geographic and Drafting Institute is the first geographical and cartographical institute in the private sector of Iran and the Middle East. It produces maps, globes, atlases and other educational materials regarding geography. The current manager of the institute is Mohammad Reza Sahab.

== History ==
Sahab Geographic and Drafting Institute was founded in 1935 by Abolghasem Sahab and his son Abbas Sahab.

== Products ==
Sahab Institute has produced more than 3000 titles, such as maps, atlases, globes, school text books and posters.

== Library ==
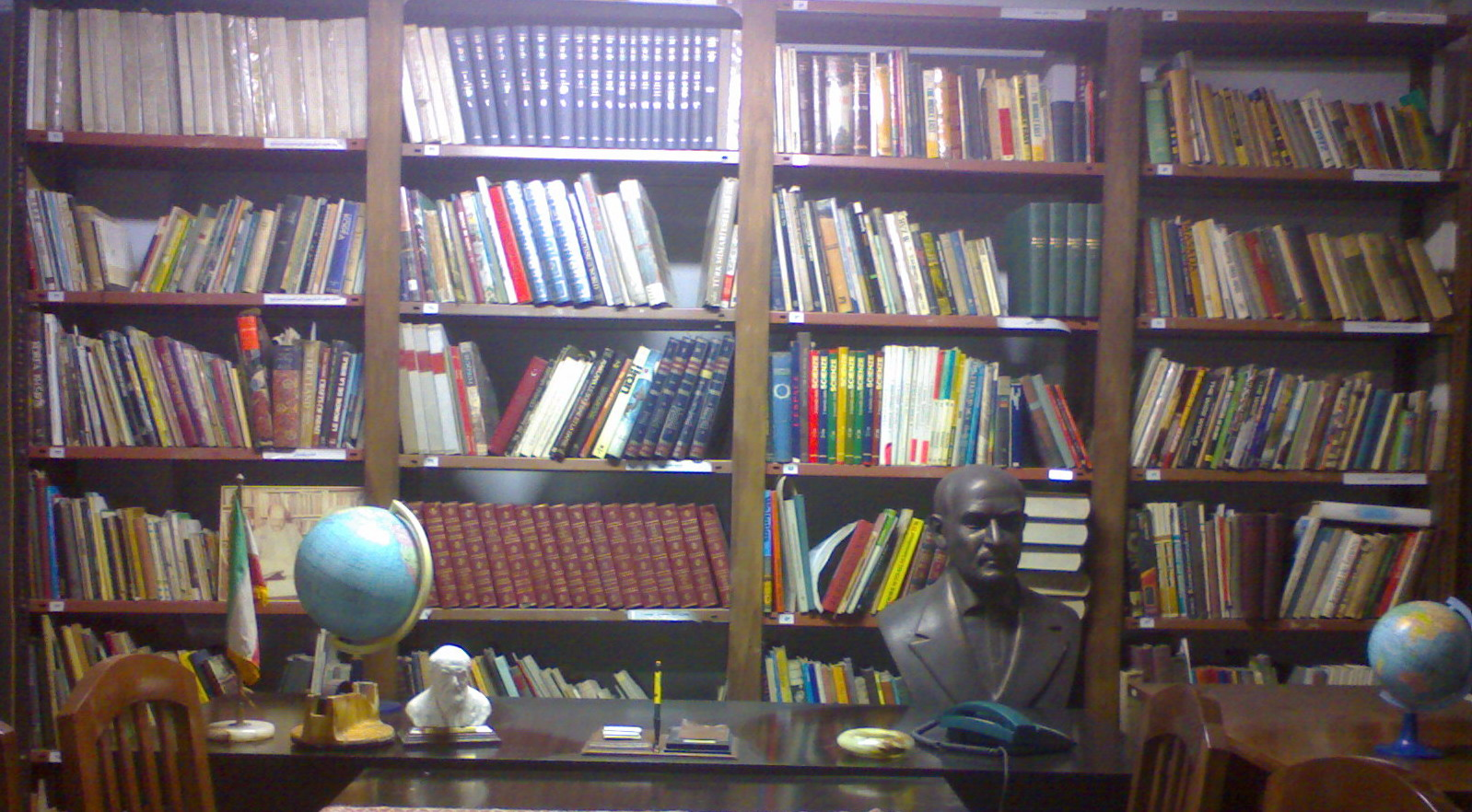
Sahab Library

Sahab Library was established by Abolghasem Sahab, and was later developed by Abbas Sahab. There are about 32000 books and journals regarding geography. There are also around 20000 different maps.

== Persian Gulf ==
Sahab Geographic and Drafting Institute has published many books and maps regarding Persian Gulf, its historical maps and the islands in the Persian Gulf.
