= Industrial City of Sahab =

Human settlement in Jordan

The Industrial City of Sahab is an industrial area in Jordan, similar to the Amman Industrial Estate and King Abdullah Industrial City. It is located within the city of Sahab. Its total area comprises 2.5 million square meters.

By mid-1998, the Industrial City of Sahab accommodated 354 medium and small industries employing more than 13,700 workers. Within the Industrial City of Sahab, there are 78 foreign, Arab and joint-venture industries. Investors include the Jordan Industrial Estate Corporation who developed an area of 202,000 square meters adjacent to the Estate. The city contains several clothing factories.

There is a large public art mural of a swan in the city.

There is evidence of heavy metal pollution in the soils of the city.
