= Sahab, Jordan =

Sahab سحاب
- City
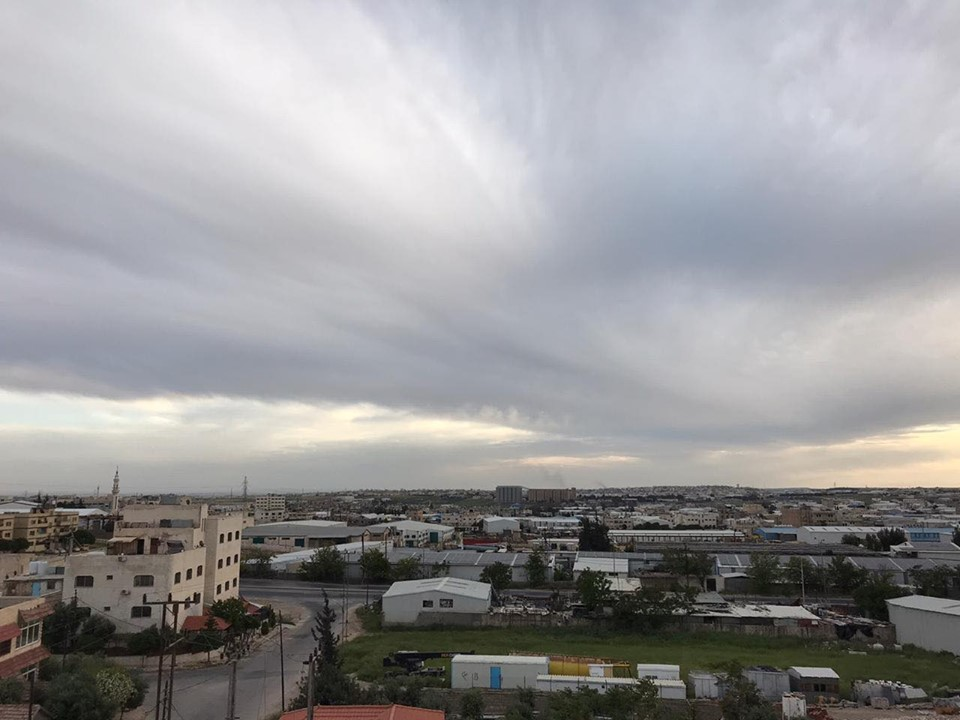
- Skyline of Sahab, 2020

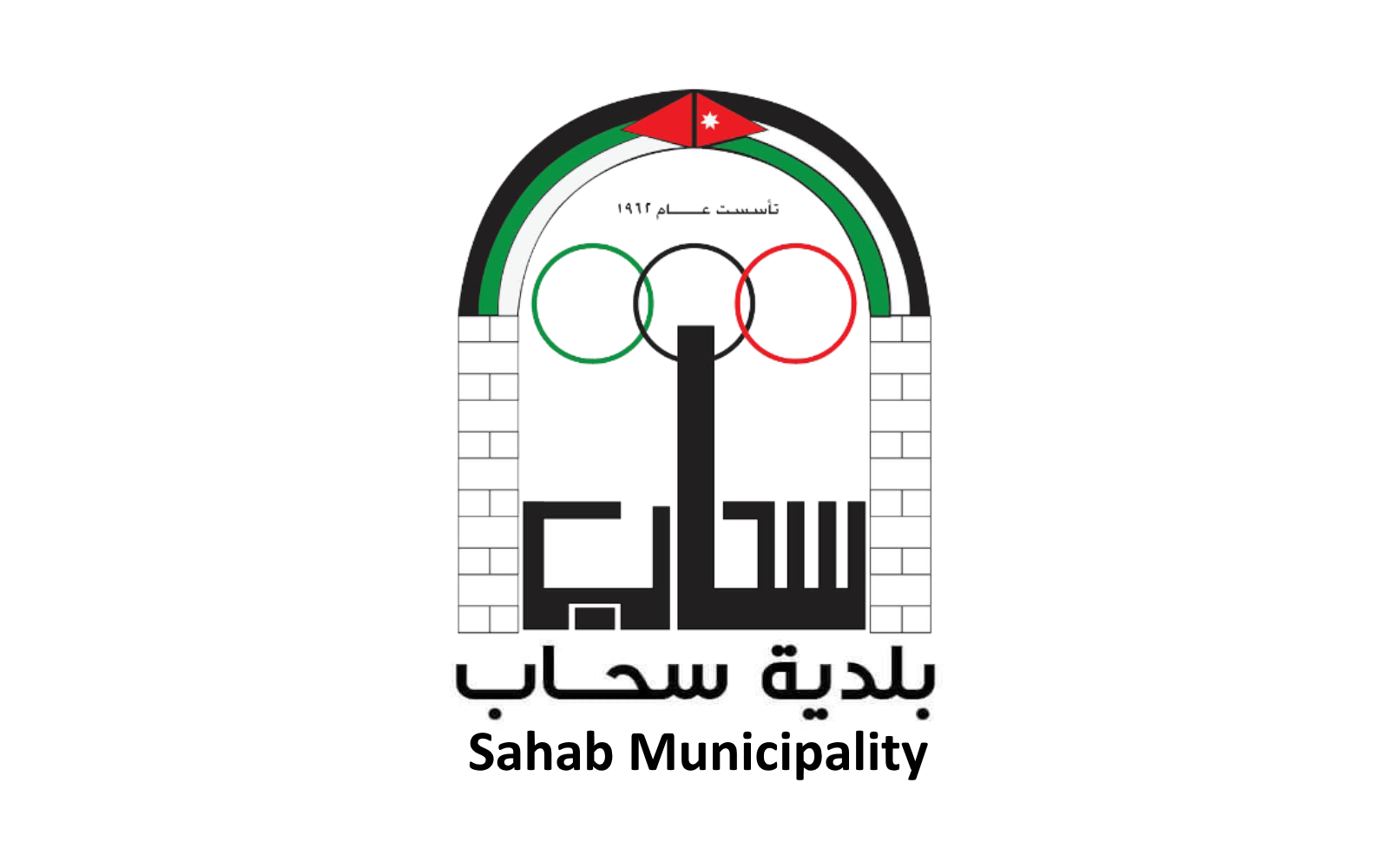
- Flag

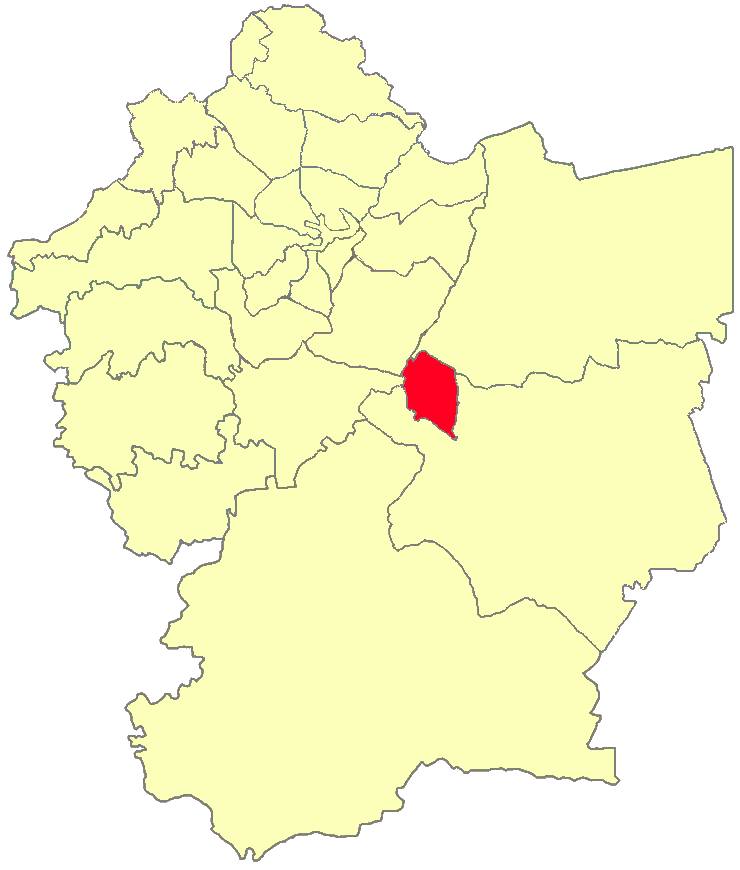
- Sahab District within the Amman Governorate

- Location within Jordan
- Country: Jordan
- Governorate: Amman Governorate
- District: Sahab
- Founding of settlement: 1894
- Founding of municipality: 1962

Government
  - Type: Municipality
  - Mayor: Abbas Maharmeh

Population (2015)
  - Total: 169,434
- Time zone: UTC + 2

Sahab (Arabic: سحاب, romanized: Saḥāb) is a municipality in Jordan located 16 kilometers (9.9 mi) southeast of the capital Amman. It is the only locality in the Sahab District of the Amman Governorate. Modern Sahab began as a Bedouin-owned plantation village in the late 19th century during Ottoman rule. The plantation was originally worked by Egyptian migrant farmers who purchased and permanently settled the lands in 1894 and developed Sahab into an agricultural estate. Sahab became its own municipality in 1962 and today is a densely populated industrial hub. It is home to the country's largest industrial city, the Abdullah II Ibn Al-Hussein Industrial Estate, and the largest cemetery in greater Amman, as well as the Caves of Raqeem site mentioned in the Qur'an (Surat al-Kahf). The population of Sahab in 2015 was 169,434.

== History ==
Beginning in the 1870s, Egyptian families mostly from the eastern villages of Egypt migrated to Transjordan to avoid corvée labor for the digging of the Suez Canal. Initially they worked as seasonal farmers in the Bedouin-owned plantation villages which began springing up in the Balqa (central Transjordan) during this period. Sahab (then known as Sahab wa Salbud) was one of nine tax-paying, Bedouin plantation villages listed in the kaza (district) of Salt in an Ottoman administrative document from 1883. The village's owners were the Bedouin of the Shararat tribe, who owed taxes in arrears to the government. Eventually, the Egyptian families permanently settled and intermarried with the local inhabitants. In 1894, three of the Egyptian clans, the Zyoud, Maharmah and Taharwah, purchased the fields around the khirba (ruined or abandoned village) of Sahab and turned the site into a major farming estate. The population of Sahab was 549 in the 1915 Ottoman census. The clans of Sahab, collectively known as "Masarwat Sahab" (the Egyptians of Sahab), ultimately became fully integrated into Jordanian society and since the 1950s they have gained electoral influence by dint of their numbers. In the 2000s or before, a representative of the community gained a seat in the country's parliament.

In 1961 the population of Sahab was 2,580 inhabitants.

Sahab had been part of Amman's city limits but became its own municipality in 1962. It serves as marketplace for the villages in the eastern Amman Governorate. Its population in 1994 was about 20,000, rising to over 43,000 in 2004. In the 2015 census, Sahab had a population over 169,000, of whom 76,000 were Jordanian citizens, 40,000 were Syrian refugees, 20,000 were migrant laborers from Southeast Asia and 15,000 were Egyptian expatriate workers.

In 1984 the Abdullah II Ibn Al-Hussein Industrial Estate (AIE) was established in Sahab. It is the largest industrial city in Jordan, covering 253 hectares, hosting 457 industries and employing 15,675 employees. Sahab contains the largest cemetery in greater Amman. The city has become known in Jordan mainly as an industrial hub, as well as for its overpopulation and pollution, prompting a 2016 initiative by its mayor Abbas Maharmeh, elected in 2013, to beautify and develop the city into a tourist destination. The initiative envisions eleven projects, among which are the transition to solar energy for electricity needs, the establishment of a museum, the creation of green areas, the painting of the city's buildings and the erection of an arabesque gate at the entrance of the town.
