= Splash lubrication =

Form of lubrication found in early engines

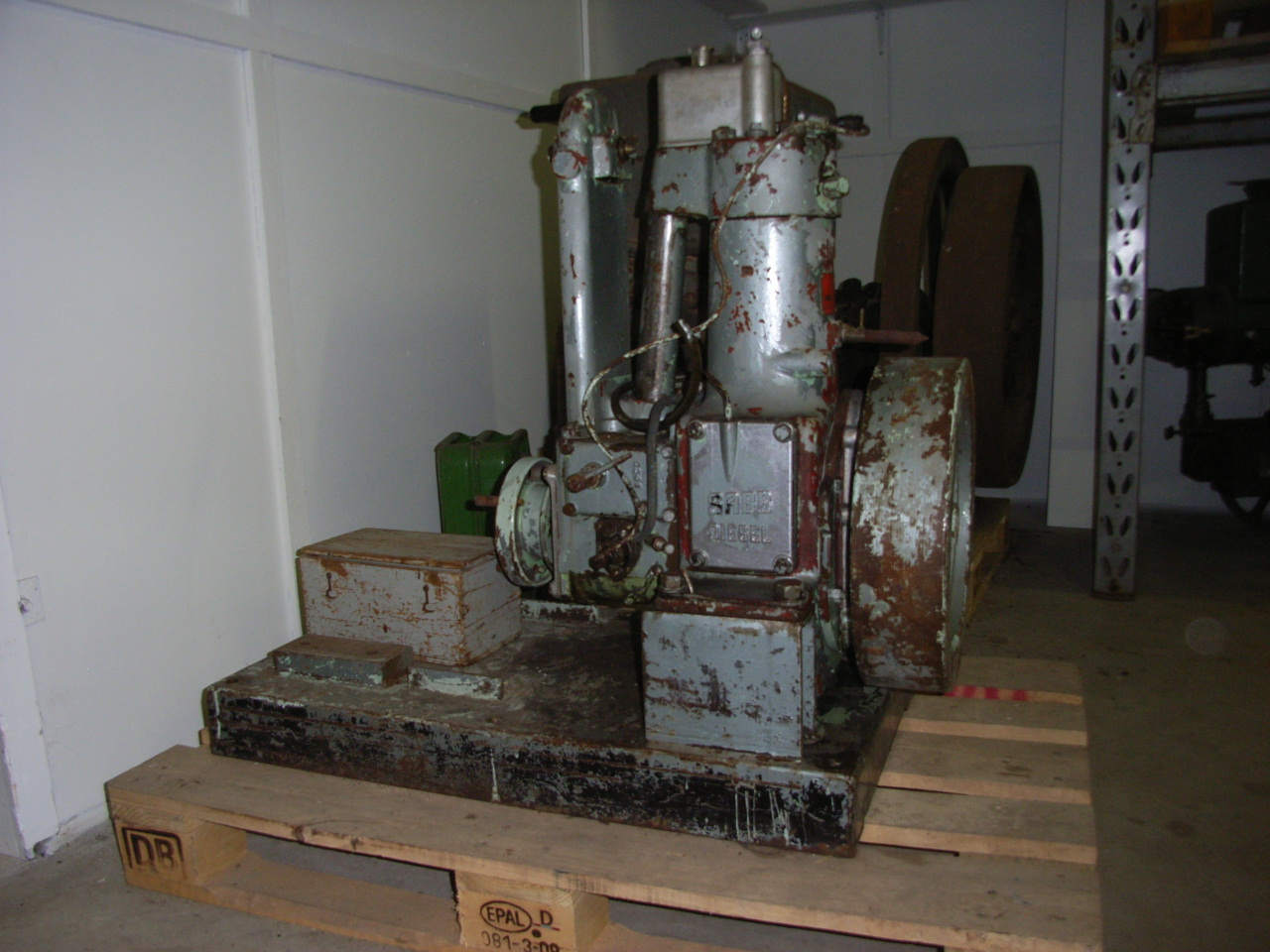
An early Sabb engine that would have used splash lubrication.

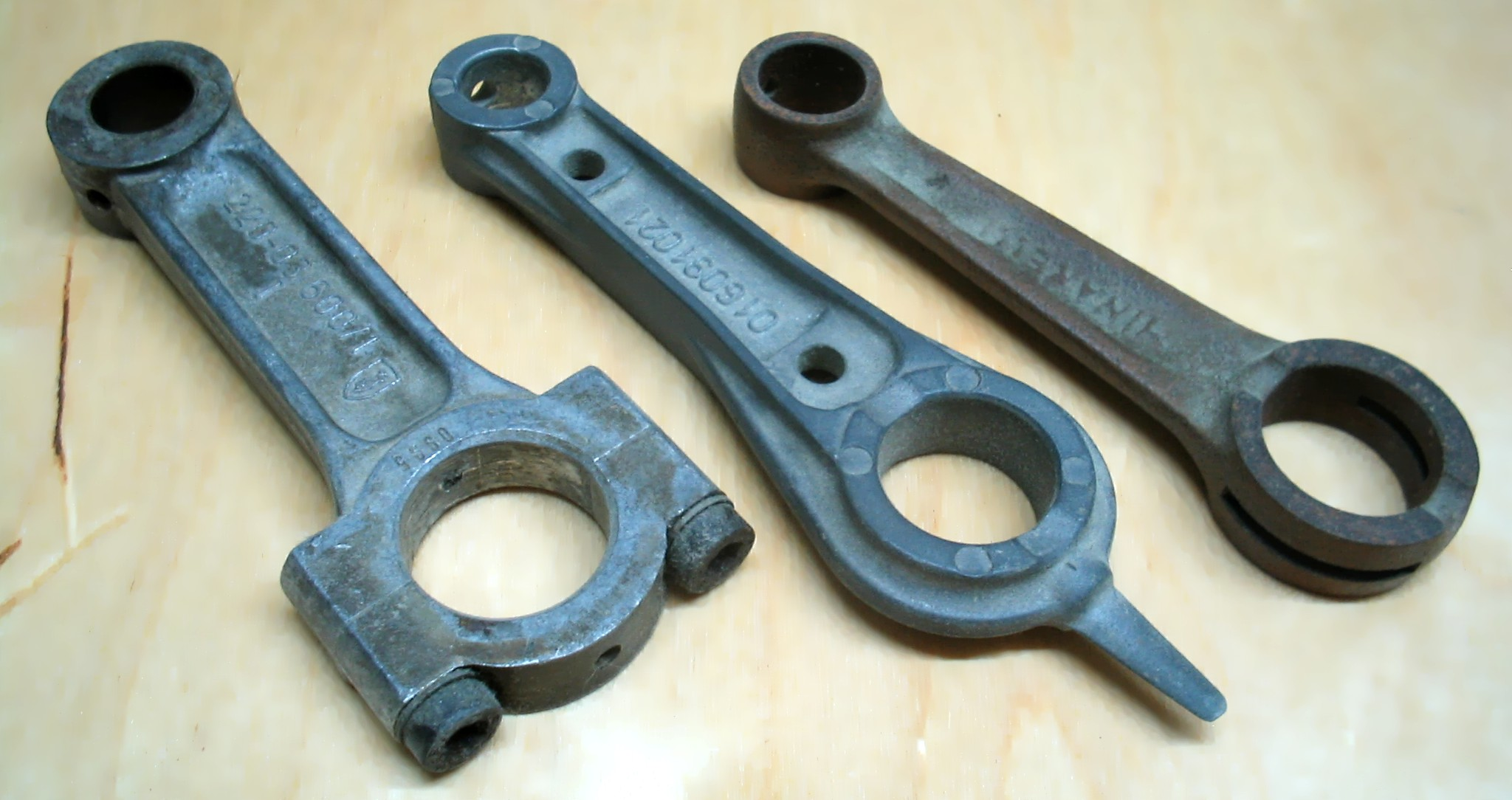
The centre con-rod has a spade for splash lubrication.

Splash lubrication is a rudimentary form of lubrication found in early engines and transmissions. Such engines could be external combustion engines (such as stationary steam engines), or internal combustion engines (such as petrol, diesel or paraffin engines).

== Description ==
An engine that uses splash lubrication requires neither oil pump nor oil filter. Splash lubrication is an antique system whereby scoops on the big-ends of the connecting rods dip into the oil sump and splash the lubricant upwards towards the cylinders, creating an oil mist which settles into droplets. The oil droplets then pass through drillings to the bearings and thereby lubricate the moving parts. Provided that the bearing is a ball bearing or a roller bearing, splash lubrication would usually be sufficient; however, plain bearings typically need a pressure feed to maintain the oil film, loss of which leads to overheating and seizure. In a transmission, some of the gears are partially submerged in fluid, which transfers lubricant to the other gears, as long as the transmission is spinning.

The splash lubrication system has simplicity, reliability, and cheapness within its virtues. However, splash lubrication can work only on very low-revving engines, as otherwise the sump oil would become a frothy mousse. The Norwegian firm, Sabb Motor, produced a number of small marine diesel engines, mostly single-cylinder or twin-cylinder units, that used splash lubrication.

== Modern use of splash lubrication ==
Splash lubrication is still used in modern engines and mechanisms, such as:

- the Robinson R22 helicopter uses splash lubrication on some bevel gears.
- all BMW motorcycles with shaft drive use splash lubrication in the final drive hub.
- British pre-unit and unit construction motorcycles, (such as Triumph, BSA and Norton) used splash lubrication in their gearboxes.
- Cars and lorries invariably still use splash lubrication in their differentials.

== See also ==
- Oil pressure
