= Sahebabad =

Sahebabad or Sahibabad may refer to the following places:

- Sahebabad, Bardsir, Kerman Province, Iran
- Sahebabad, Jiroft, Kerman Province
- Sahibabad, Uttar Pradesh, India
  - Sahibabad Assembly constituency
  - Sahibabad Junction railway station
  - Sahibabad RRTS station
- Sahibabad Daulat Pur, village in Delhi, India

== See also ==
- Saheb (disambiguation)
- Abad (disambiguation)
