= Abbas Sahab =

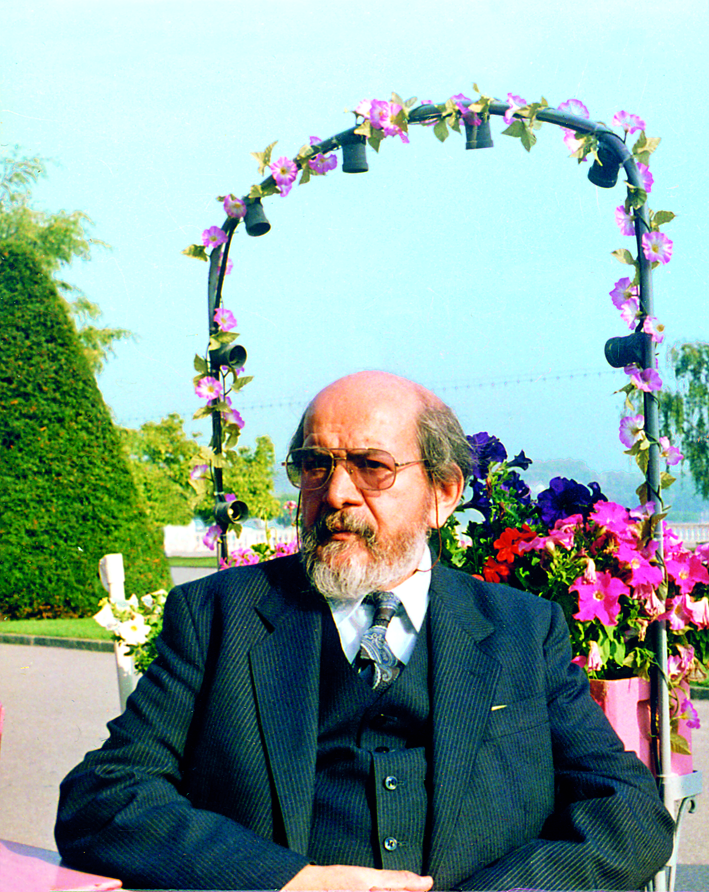
Abbas Sahab

Abbas Sahab (Persian: عباس سحاب); 24 December 1921, Tafresh – 3 April 2000, Tehran) was an Iranian cartographer and founder of the Sahab Geographic and Drafting Institute. He is considered by many as the founding father of modern Persian cartography.

Among his many published works is the first atlas of the Persian Gulf.
