= Devi Sahab =

- Born: 1841
- Died: 1919 (aged 77–78)
- Other names: Devi Sahab
- Known for: Renowned Sant in the tradition of Sant Mat

Baba Devi Sahab (1841–1919) was one of the leaders of the Sant Mat religious movement, popularizing it throughout North India and Pakistan.

== Early life ==
It is said that his parents had been childless for a long time before his birth. The tradition holds that when Devi Sahab was nearly four years of age, Sant Tulsi Sahab visited his house again and prophesied that he would one day turn into a great sant.

== Later life ==
Baba Devi Sahab lived a simple life as a postal clerk while practicing his spiritual discipline. He voluntarily retired early and lived his latter years in Moradabad in the state of Uttar Pradesh. He was a kind teacher and had a large following. Baba Devi Sahab says:

You may remain Hindu, Muslim, Christian or a follower of any other religion. But while living the pleasures and pains of human life do not live even a single day without inner meditation.

== Spiritual mission ==
Baba Devi Sahab took forward and enriched the spiritual legacy of Sant Tulsi Sahab of Hathras (U.P.) by holding Satsangs and propagating the message of Santmat to different portions of the Northern and the erstwhile North-Western India that included parts of what is now Pakistan.

He eventually located his Ashram, base camp, at Moradabad/Muradabad, Uttar Pradesh. However, before that he is said to have spent a few years at Agra also where, it is said, he attended Satsang of Rai Bahadur Shaligram Ji (Hazur Rai Saligram Bahadur, later popularly also known as Huzur/Hazur Maharaj) who was the successor of Sant Radhaswami Sahab.

Padma Das Ji, a devotee in the Radhaswami tradition of Santmat and a close friend of Baba Devi Sahab, is said to have invited him to Agra to attend Satsang there. It is Padma Das Ji who is said to have introduced Baba Devi Sahab to Rai Bahadur Shaligram Ji (Hazur Rai Saligram Bahadur).

Padma Das took Baba Devi to Rai Bahadur Shaligram's Satsang. There, Padma Das narrated to Shaligram Sahab about his (Baba Devi's) story -- his intensified devotion from the childhood, demise of parents in very short [young] age, his firm determination and increasing intuition to spend his life as Yogi in a lonely place. Hearing all of these, Rai Sahab asked Baba Devi, 'Do you know the method of meditation which you want to practice in a secluded place?' 'Yes' -- Baba Devi replied humbly. Then Shaligram Sahab asked, 'From where you have got it?' Baba Devi told, 'I am disciple of Sant Tulsi Sahab and he himself has blessed me.' Then Shaligram Sahab became very glad to hear it and told [Baba Devi] that 'you are a member of my own family because Sant Tulsi Sahib was my most reverend.' Rai Sahab further explained about the association of his Guru (master), Shiv Dayal Swami Ji and Sant Tulsi Sahab's disciple Giridhari Das. He disclosed that his Guru Shiv Dayal ji used to tell that he (Shiv Dayal) had been greatly benefited with the association of Baba Giridhari Das, a disciple of Sant Tulsi Sahab.

— The Biography of Baba Devi Sahab, excerpted in English at the SadguruMehi website on a web page titled, "Life And Teachings of Baba Devi Sahab").

== Preaching ==
Baba Devi Sahab preached the oneness of God that indwells each & every being. That one only God, he taught, can be realised within by every human being regardless of one's caste, creed, region or religion by practicing inner meditation - meditation on inner light and meditation on inner sound also known as surat shabd yoga - learnt from a true adept or sadguru. While some other lineages of Santmat (Sant Mat) in due course of time took on different names relating to their founders or some other suitable terms like Kabir Panth, Dariya Panth, Radhasoami etc., Baba Devi Sahab preferred to continue with the more general and generic term Santmat.

Baba Devi Sahab gave a clear exposition of the inner cosmology based on his own experiences of inner meditation. In the Preface to the Ghat Ramayan (Ghat Ramayan' is the name of a book popularly believed to have been authored by Sant Tulsi Sahab of Hathras, Uttar Pradesh, India. Baba Devi Sahab got the handwritten manuscript of Sant Tulsi Sahab of Hathras printed at Hathras itself in the year of 1896) of Sant Tulsi Sahab of Hathras, he has presented a precise chart of the fourteen inner planes.

Baba Devi Sahab preached that it was by no other means save inner meditation which consisted mainly of the Yoga of Inner Light and the Yoga of Inner Sound that one could attain complete liberation from the shackles of transmigration. He would preach that selfless pure love, 'ishq' or 'bhakti' towards the God is of utmost importance. He cautioned people to very carefully and meticulously guard against the vices of jealousy and vainglory as these defile our mind.

== Disciples ==
Baba Devi Sahab, who was the contemporary of Param Purush Puran Dhani Soamiji Maharaj (Shiv Dayal Singh) and Sant Hazur Rai Saligram Bahadur Sahab Ji, had several disciples including Shri Nandan Das. Maharshi Mehi Paramhans organised the lineage of Santmat, and spread its influence overseas to countries like the United States, the United Kingdom, the erstwhile USSR, Japan, Norway, Sweden, and Nepal.
