= SaabO =

By SAAB

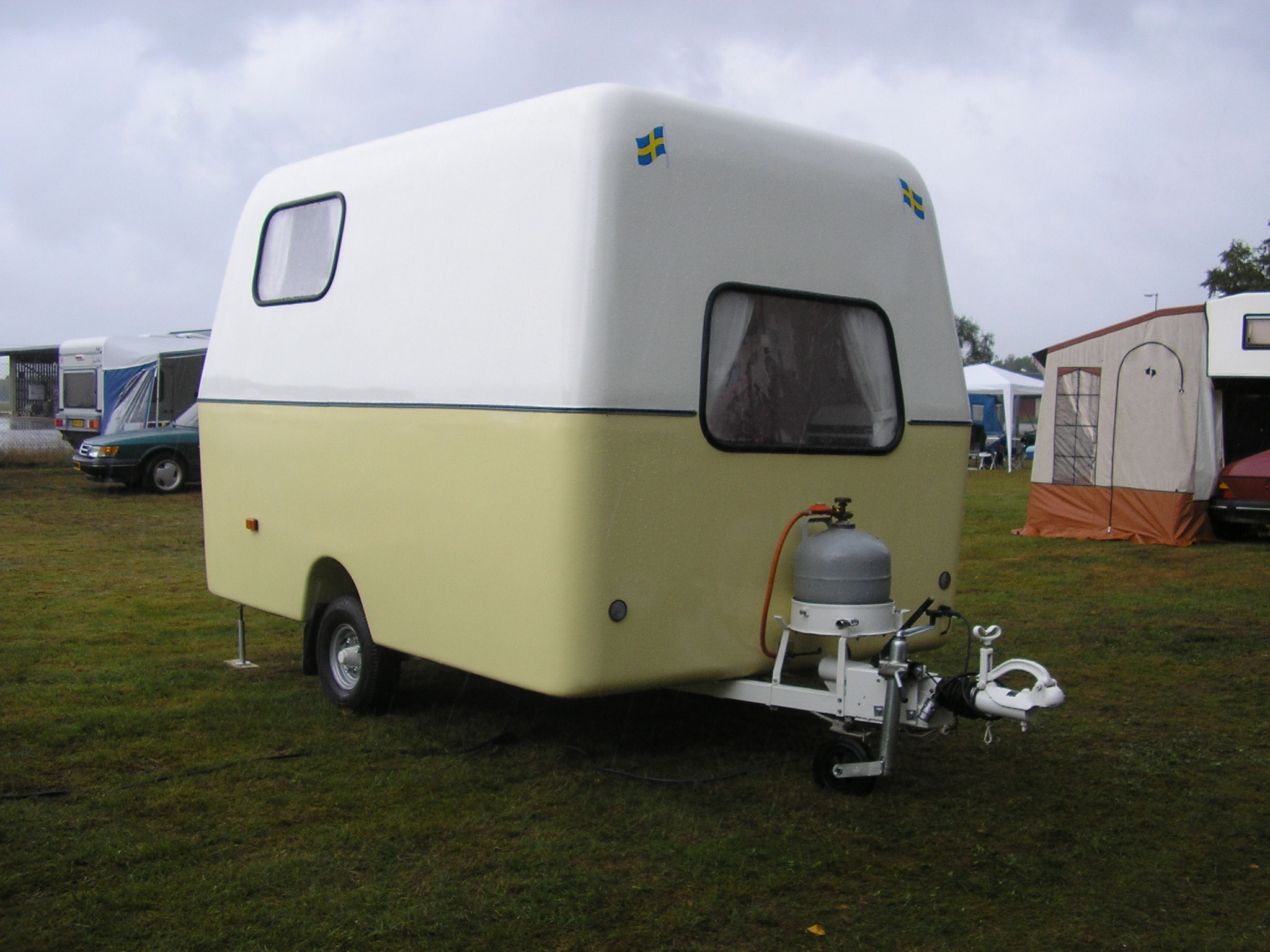
SaabO camper. Notice the low set window.

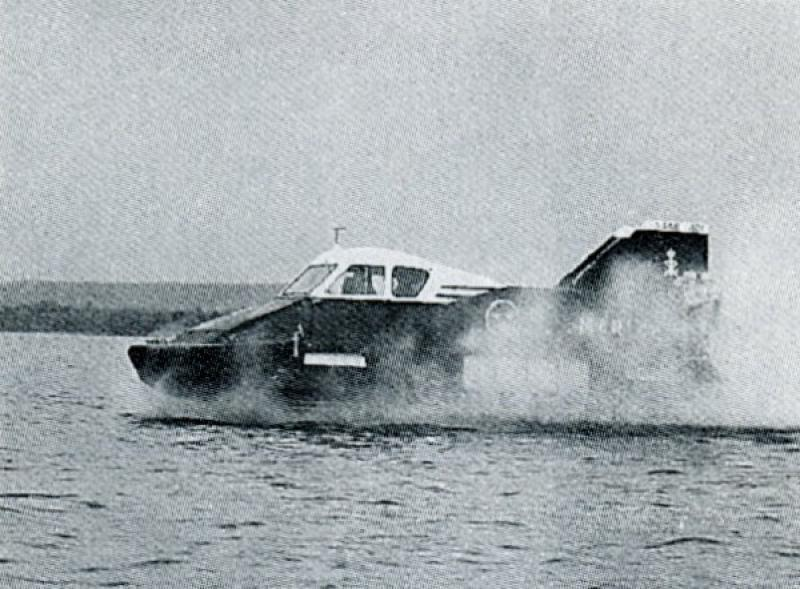
Only one Saab 401 hovercraft was built.

SaabO (official name Saab Typ 260-3 Saabo) is a caravan created and manufactured by Saab from 1964-1968 in Ljunga, outside Norrköping, Sweden. In total, 390 units were manufactured.

The project was started by Bo Bjernekull of the Ljunga plant and Birger Lindberg at Saab in Linköping. Officially they were working on a project called MEFAN that was supposed to produce hovercraft for the military. Unofficially they made a camper caravan.

The idea was to get a product to even out the workload at the helicopter department, that at the time mainly assembled helicopters manufactured in France. After making a model in 1:10 scale they received the OK for production. A first prototype was made at Fisksätra boatyard and the pre-production prototypes at Marieholms Bruk. The first prototypes were made without brakes, but these were soon added. It was important to keep the weight down as the caravan would be used with automobiles with as little as 25 hp (19 kW), like the 38 hp (28 kW) two stroke Saab 96. Another reason to save weight was that Swedish regulation at the time allowed unrestricted speed with a caravan if the weight was low enough.

The SaabO included space enough for a family of four, or five (with bunk). It was designed with large, low-set windows so the driver of the towing vehicle could see through the caravan when looking in the rear-view mirror. The interior consisted of two sofas, a dining table, galley sink and two wardrobes. Liquified petroleum gas was used for cooking, heating and lighting. The design was made with two half shells of glass-reinforced plastic (GRP) enclosing an insulation of folded cardboard.

== Specifications ==
At time of launch

- Total length: 3.60 metres (141.7 in)
- Width: 1.84 metres (72.4 in)
- Height: 2.10 metres (82.7 in)
- Inner height: 1.80 metres (70.9 in)
- Weight: 230 kg (507 lb) – 290 kg (639 lb)
- Cost at launch: 4950 SEK

== See also ==
- Toppola
