= Sabb Motor =

Norwegian engine manufacturer

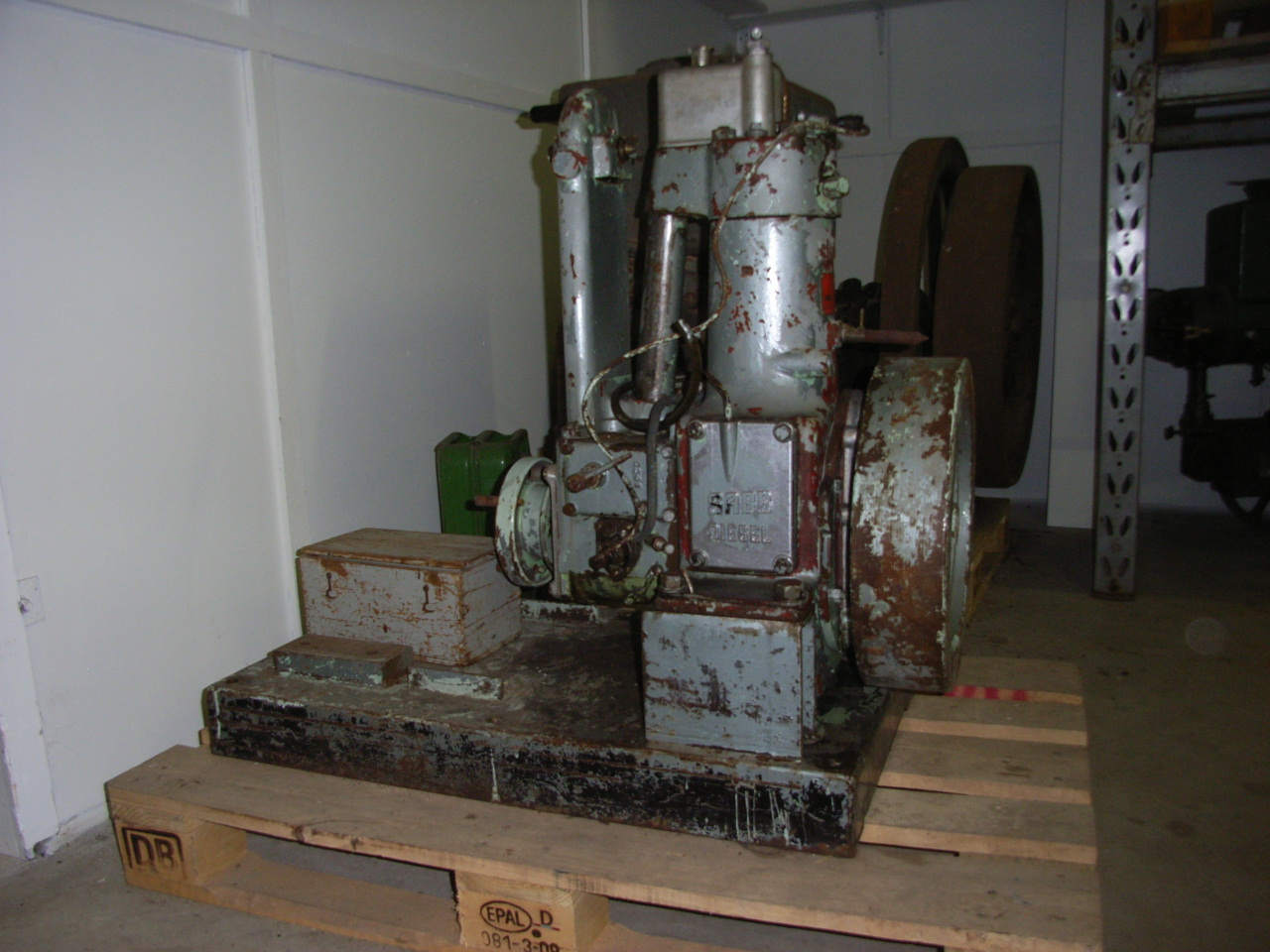
A Sabb engine in the Norwegian Tractor and Motor Museum at Stokke

Sabb Motor is a Norwegian maker of small marine diesel engines, mostly single-cylinder or twin-cylinder units. The firm was established as Damsgaard Motorfabrikk by two brothers, Alf and Håkon Søyland in 1925. The firm started building engines to meet the demand of fishermen who wanted simple, robust and reliable power for their boats. (The word 'Sabb' means toughness and reliability).

== History ==
The brothers' cottage industry began by creating a 3HP hot-bulb engine. This was followed by a larger 7HP version which tended to suffer broken crankshafts, but the firm was able to solve the problem and re-launch their engines under the name Ny-Sabb (New Sabb). By 1975, Sabb Motor was producing 3,200 engines a year between 8 and 30 bhp. Facing market competition, the firm concentrated on providing 30bhp engines for ship’s lifeboats, a decision which increased worldwide demand. The UK's distributor of Sabb engines is Sleeman & Hawken Ltd. More recently, Sabb have established a link with Mitsubishi.

In 2006 Sabb Motor AS was bought by Frydenbø Industri and renamed Frydenbø Sabb Motor AS.

== Sabb engines ==
Sabb engines are rugged and simple; for example, some have "splash lubrication" which requires no oil pump nor filter. (Splash lubrication is an antique system whereby "spades" on the big-end caps dip into the oil sump and splash the lubricant upwards; clearly it is a system that can work only on very low-revving engines, otherwise the sump oil would become a frothy mousse).

Sabb engines include Types H, G, GA, 2H, 2G, & 2J.
