= Student African American Brotherhood =

American college organization

- Abbreviation: SAAB
- Founded: October 17, 1990; 35 years ago
- Founder: Tyrone Bledsoe
- Founded at: Georgia Southwestern State University
- Type: Professional
- Headquarters: Springfield, Missouri
- Location: United States
- Members: 200+ chapters
- Executive Director: Tyrone Bledsoe
- Publication: SAAB News
- Website: Official website

The Student African American Brotherhood (SAAB) is an American professional organization for college and high school students. It founded on the campus of Georgia Southwestern State University in Americus, Georgia, on October 17, 1990. SAAB mentors young African Americans by educating them on their responsibilities as United States citizens. The general objective of the program is to make each young man aware of his potential, purpose, and life goals; however, much emphasis is focused on leadership development and training. It has over 168 chapters in the United States and abroad.

== History ==
Dr. Tyrone Bledsoe established the Student African American Brotherhood (SAAB) on October 17, 1990 on the campus of Georgia Southwestern State University. Bledsoe was the Vice President for Student Life and Special Assistant to the President at the University of Toledo but transitioned into the role of executive director of the SAAB National Headquarters.

Bledsoe established the Student African American Brotherhood to address the academic and social challenges of African American males at Georgia Southwestern and has many collegiate and high school chapters around the country. SAAB is committed to providing opportunities for at-risk males in high schools and colleges.

SAAB is a professional organization whose members serve as role models for inner-city neighborhoods throughout the country. SAAB tries to help men of color to realize and achieve their fullest potential by upholding a caring outlook and to transform themselves by changing their attitudes, mentoring their fellow brothers and providing positive leadership within their community.

The organization’s commitment to enhancing the school and life experiences of underprivileged men of color is fueled by the synergy of the college campus and the concept of graduating from high school and college as a means to survival and self-sufficiency. By mobilizing and developing human capital through our student participants, SAAB hopes to infuse our society with a culture of young men that will make a national impact and empower all people through appropriate mentoring and role modeling despite social disparities, to achieve an education and in turn play an active role in bettering the lives of others.

== Chapter structure ==
SAAB attempts to distinguish itself from other minority student programs in the following ways:

1. A national success rate as a dynamic educational-based organization that serves thousands of young men at 180 middle schools, high schools; community colleges and four-year institutions with chapters that are at least 5 years old. Eighty Six percent (86%) of SAAB student members graduate from college, compared to a national average of 42% among black men in particular.
2. To become a SAAB member one must accept the charge to be a role model and a mentor. SAAB members are polite, sincere, hardworking, and encouraging; knowing that these characteristics are counter to the popular but offensive negative images of young black and brown men in America.
3. SAAB members are required to tutor and mentor high school, middle school and elementary students as a way to seed the same caring spirit that SAAB promotes.
4. When compared to other male support groups and fraternal organizations geared towards the same population, SAAB maintains stricter membership requirements that are unrelated to entertainment or sports. SAAB Chapters must adhere to annual membership requirements and core standards to remain part of the national network and comply with implementation fidelity desired across all chapters.

== Membership ==
SAAB membership is open to any student attending an institution that is a registered SAAB Chapter.

== Activities ==
The First International SAAB Leadership Institute was held at the University of Toledo in Toledo, Ohio on March 4–6, 2004 under the theme "Strength for Your Journey: Voices of the Past". Brothers from various chapters were able to meet with other brothers who held similar goals and aspirations.

The Student African American Brotherhood members serve their communities through mentorship, role modeling, and programming that highlights the experiences of African American culture as well as black men’s roles in society.
