= Hassan Saab =

Lebanese diplomat and political scientist

Hassan Saab (15 October 1922 – 25 July 1990) was a Lebanese diplomat and political scientist. Saab was born in October 1922 and died in July 1990 at the age of 67.

== Works ==
Although most of Saab's work has been published in Arabic, some work is available in English:

- The Arab federalists of the Ottoman Empire, 1958
- 'The Rationalist School in Lebanese Politics', in Leonard Binder, ed. (1966). Politics in Lebanon. Wiley.
- Zionism and racism, 1968
