= Babasaheb (title) =

Babasaheb (Devanagari: बाबासाहेब, IAST: Bābāsāhēb) is a nickname given in India. It is a Marathi phrase which means 'Respected Father' (Baba 'father' and Saheb 'sir').

Notable people with the nickname include:

- B. R. Ambedkar, Indian jurist, economist, social reformer and politician who chaired the committee that drafted the Constitution of India
  - List of things named after B. R. Ambedkar
- Babasaheb Bhosale (Anantrao Bhosale, 1921–2007), Indian politician
- Babasaheb Purandare (Balwant Moreshwar Purandare, 1922–2021), Indian historian and writer
- Babasaheb Apte (Umakant Keshav Apte, 1903–1971), of the Hindu nationalist organisation Rashtriya Swayamsevak Sangh
- Babasaheb Gawde (Gangaram Govind Gawde) 1904-1986 Started Maratha Mandir, co-founder and Hon. Gen. Secretary(1946-1969)
