= Wakim (Levantine family) =

Levantine Christian clan

Wakim family آل يواكيم Yowakim; Youakim; Yowakeem
- Levantine Christian clan
- Current region: Lebanon (Mount Lebanon, Beqaa, Zahlé, Jezzine, Tripoli) & Palestine/Israel (Jerusalem area, Galilee, coastal cities)
- Etymology: From Hebrew Yehoyaqim (Jehoiakim) “(Yahweh) has raised (up)” → Arabic يواكيم (Yowakim)
- Origin: Lower Galilee / Jerusalem region (present-day Israel/Palestine); extended into Lebanon (Mount Lebanon, Beqaa)
- Founded: c. 2nd–4th century (tradition)
- Founder: St. Joachim (tradition)
- Members: Saba Youakim; Najah Wakim; Bishara Wakim; Emil Wakim
- Traditions: Maronite Church; Melkite Greek Catholic Church; Greek Orthodox Church of Antioch

The Wakim family (also transliterated as Yowakim, Youakim, or Yowakeem) is a Levantine Christian family historically rooted in lower Galilee, modern day Lebanon and Palestine/Israel, with branches documented in Mount Lebanon and the Beqaa Valley (notably Zahlé) and in the Jerusalem area.

Over the centuries, members of the family have consistently held notable positions in church leadership and public life including Eftimios Youakim who participated in all four sessions of the Second Vatican Council as Archbishop of the Melkite Greek Catholic Archeparchy of Zahle and Forzol (1926–1971), and Saba Youakim, Archbishop of Archeparchy of Petra and Philadelphia in Amman (1968–1992).

In politics, Najah Wakim served as a Lebanese Member of Parliament (1972–2000) and later founded the People's Movement, remaining a notable public figure. In the Holy Land, members of the family are recorded in Emmaus al-Qubeibeh near Jerusalem; in recent years, a Wakim household has been described as the village's only remaining Christian family.

The clan's origins are unusually well-documented, with Melkite, Maronite and Greek Orthodox records tracing their lineage to before the Islamic conquest of the Levant. The name derives from the Hebrew Yehoyaqim (rendered as Joachim in Christian tradition), meaning “raised” or “established by God.”In hagiographical and apocryphal traditions—particularly the Protoevangelium of James—Saint Joachim and Saint Anne are venerated as the parents of the Virgin Mary, with Saint Joachim regarded as the ancestral patriarch associated with the family.

For centuries, the family was associated with the Desposyni, the early Judeo-Christian families regarded as relatives of Jesus. According to continuously preserved genealogical records dating to 112 AD, contemporary Yowakim's from the Galilee region are direct descendants of Jude, the brother of Jesus of Nazareth.

== History ==
The earliest documented ancestors of the clan were part of the Jewish Christian community around Jerusalem, Nazareth, and Antioch Both genealogical accounts and church records link them to the earliest Christians – as blood relatives of Jesus's family and as members of the first Jewish-Christian congregations. The earliest ancestor of the clan to receive scholarly attestation is generally identified as Judah of Jerusalem, making modern descendants the only verified modern representatives of the Davidic Line

The first mention of the clan lineage emerging from Jesus’ relatives or apostles was recorded by church historians. Eusebius of Caesarea (4th century) wrote that the grandchildren of Jude (described as a “brother” or kin of Jesus) were known to the authorities of the Roman Empire to reside in Galilee. Such “relatives of the Lord” purportedly became leaders in the early Church of Jerusalem.

It was not unique for early Christian clans in the Levant to keep records of their genealogy and track decent from the earliest saints. Scholarly surveys of Levantine Christian lineages note that certain families with biblical surnames – for example, Youhanna (John), Hanania (Ananias), Sahyoun (Zion), Chamoun (Simon) – are traditionally viewed as descendants of the original Jewish disciples of Christ. Some historians believe that certain Christian clans in this period intentionally maintained endogamous marriages to preserve their "sacred lineage".

By the 7th century, clan members were Aramaic-speaking Judaean Christians. Despite upheavals (Persian and Arab conquests, Crusades), the Yowakim clan remained in the Levant. By medieval times the clan was known to be settled in villages around Jerusalem. Some branches of the Yowakim family escaped Jerusalem into Mount Lebanon for safety and autonomy during the Crusade persecutions. Preserved writings suggest that in the 11th century, Maronite Yowakims were present in the mountains, preserving manuscripts of their genealogy, though only two documents from this era still remain intact.

Under Ottoman rule, the clan name appears frequently in local administrative and church records. In Ottoman Palestine, the family was noted as a long-established Christian household with administrative responsibilities. In Ein Karem, traditionally regarded as the birthplace of John the Baptist, the Wakim family was among the recognized Christian families by the sixteenth century. A nineteenth-century report references a “Dr. Wakim’s clinic” in the same village.

In Galilee, oral histories mention the Wakims in villages like Iqrit and Biram (which were entirely Christian), with migration or expansion northward during this time. Meanwhile, in Lebanon, Maronite patriarchal records and local histories begin to list the Wakim (Youakim) family among notable clans. They are found in El-Mina (Tripoli) and Bsharri in the north, and in Jezzine and surrounding villages in the south . These locales correspond to Maronite heartlands (Bsharri) and mixed Maronite/Orthodox areas (Tripoli, Jezzine). Some branches likely migrated from Hauran (southern Syria) to Mount Lebanon in the eighteenth century, integrating into the Maronite community. By the late 1800s, the Yowakim's in Lebanon were landowners and clergymen. They built churches and participated in local governance under Ottoman feudal lords.

The tumultuous 20th century greatly affected the family's distribution. In Palestine, members of the Wakim family were still concentrated in the Jerusalem area and in coastal cities. One notable example is Victor Wakim's family from Ein Karem: they remained in Palestine through World War II. After 1948, when Ein Karem's Christian populace was ethnically cleansed, Victor's father relocated the family to the village of Al-Qubeiba (northwest of Jerusalem) . They became known as the last Christian family in that village in later years, stubbornly maintaining a presence while others emigrated. In Lebanon, many Yowakim's gravitated to Beirut as it became the hub of commerce and education.

Lebanese Yowakims served in government administration or the church. An early 20th-c. figure, Father Francis Wakim, was an abbot in the Antonine Maronite Order, heading a monastery in the Metn region . His brother Edmond Wakim led the Finance Department in Ottoman/ French-mandate era Lebanon . This period also saw emigration: branches of the family moved abroad seeking opportunity.

Bishara Wakim, for instance, took his family from Lebanon to Egypt early in the century; he himself became a famed actor and film director in Cairo's golden age of cinema .

In the United States, Elias Wakim (born in Lebanon) became influential in Lebanese–American affairs. Friends with U.S. President Franklin D. Roosevelt, he and one of his daughters would later serve in the U.S. State Department.

Today the Yowakim/Wakim family remains widely dispersed yet cohesive in identity as a clan. In Lebanon, numerous Wakim families live in Beirut and Mount Lebanon, as well as in their ancestral towns (Jezzine, Bsharri, etc.), often still prominent in business and local politics.

In the State of Israel, only a handful of Wakim individuals and families remain, due to past displacement and ethnic cleansing. The Wakim Family in Qubeiba stands out – as of 2022, they were literally the last Christian family in that West Bank village, though their “big family is now scattered across the world”. Many Palestinian Wakims became part of the diaspora in Jordan, the Americas, or Australia after 1948, though some resettled in Nazareth and Haifa.

Attorney Wakim Wakim in Israel is a leading advocate for the rights of internally displaced Palestinians (the “Present Absentees”). As secretary of the Committee for the Rights of the Internally Displaced in Israel, he campaigns for the right of return to villages like Iqrit and Biram.

== Notable contributions ==
Throughout its history, the Wakim clan have been active leaders in religious, economic, and political life. Members of the family have included writers, clergy, academics, politicians, entertainers.

=== Church leadership ===
Many Yowakims entered the clergy. In addition to local priests over the centuries, the family has produced higher-ranking clerics. In the late 1800s, a certain Bishop Youakim (Wakim) is recorded as a regional Orthodox bishop in Syria. Father Francis Wakim (mentioned earlier) was a well-known Maronite figure in mid-20th century Lebanon. He served as the manager (Abbot) of the Antonine Monastery in the town of Baabda, overseeing monastic lands and educational activities. His leadership in a major Maronite order underscores the esteem the family held in church circles. Also, among the Melkite Greek Catholics, Archimandrite Paul Wakim was said to be a 19th-century monk who traveled between Lebanon and Palestine, tending to scattered Christian flocks.

=== Local administrators and professionals ===
In Ottoman times, Yowakeem men often served as mukhtar (headman) or as scribes due to their education. Edmond Wakim, was the minister of the Finance Department in Baabda (the provincial capital) – effectively part of the governing bureaucracy under the French Mandate.

Even after displacement in 1948, Palestinian Wakims continued in such roles abroad – for instance, some became doctors in Jordan and the Gulf states. The tradition of public service extends to the present: in Israel, Wakim Wakim (born 1958), beyond his advocacy role, is a practicing lawyer and often provides pro bono legal help to displaced villagers. In Lebanon, numerous Wakims are engineers, educators, and entrepreneurs today.

=== Political and social leaders ===
Najah Anis Wakim (born 1946) made a name as a fiery populist politician. He won a seat in the Lebanese Parliament in 1972 at a young age, representing Beirut. A critic of corruption and foreign interference, he remained in Parliament until 2000, at times as a lone opposition voice. In 2000 he founded the People's Movement (Harakat al-Sha’b), a secular nationalist political party.

=== Cultural figures ===
Bishara Wakim (1890–1949) was a renowned actor and director in Egypt’s early film industry. Born to a Maronite Wakim family that emigrated from Lebanon to Alexandria, Bishara (sometimes credited as Bechara Wakim) became a pioneer of theater and Egyptian cinema

Emil Wakim is an American comedian and actor. He was a featured cast member on Saturday Night Live for its 50th season. He was the first Lebanese SNL cast member in history.

=== Custodians of holy sites ===
The Youakims are custodians of certain religious sites. For generations a branch of the Wakim family in Al-Qulaylah, Lebanon were the keepers of the Maqam Nabi Imran (St. Joachim’s shrine). They maintained the shrine, welcomed pilgrims – Christian and Muslim – and passed down the stories associated with it. Although today the shrine is managed by Islamic authorities (since it’s also revered in Islam as the tomb of Imran, father of Mary), the memory of the Christian family that watched over it remains.

Similarly, in Jerusalem, the Church of Saint Anne (traditionally built over Mary’s parents’ home) were under the care of the Wakim's with “Yaqub Wakim” among those keyholders in the 19th century.

== Notable figures ==
- Saba Youakim (born 1937), Archbishop of Petra and Philadelphia in Amman
- Emil Wakim (born 1998), Lebanese-American comedian and actor
- Bishara Wakim (1890–1949), Egyptian director and actor
- Chris Wakim, former member of the West Virginia House of Delegates
- Najah Wakim (born 1946), president and one of the founders of the Lebanese leftist group the People's Movement
- Sam Wakim (born 1937), Canadian lawyer and former Progressive Conservative party member of the Canadian House of Commons
