= Wakim =

Wakim آل يواكيم Joaquim, Yowakim; Youakim; Yowakeem
- Levantine Christian clan
- Current region: Lebanon (Mount Lebanon, Beqaa, Zahlé, Jezzine, Tripoli) & Palestine/Israel (Jerusalem area, Galilee, coastal cities)
- Etymology: From Hebrew Yehoyaqim (Jehoiakim) “(Yahweh) has raised (up)” → Arabic يواكيم (Yowakim)
- Origin: Lower Galilee / Jerusalem region (present-day Israel/Palestine); extended into Lebanon (Mount Lebanon, Beqaa)
- Founded: c. 2nd–4th century (tradition)
- Founder: St. Joachim (tradition)
- Members: Saba Youakim; Najah Wakim; Bishara Wakim; Emil Wakim
- Traditions: Maronite Church; Melkite Greek Catholic Church; Greek Orthodox Church of Antioch

Wakim (also transliterated as Joaquim, Yowakim, Youakim, or Yowakeem) is a Levantine Christian family surname historically rooted in lower Galilee, modern day Lebanon and Palestine/Israel, with branches documented in Mount Lebanon and the Beqaa Valley (notably Zahlé) and in the Jerusalem area.

Over the centuries, members of the clan have consistently held notable positions in church leadership and public life including Eftimios Youakim who participated in all four sessions of the Second Vatican Council as Archbishop of the Melkite Greek Catholic Archeparchy of Zahle and Forzol (1926–1971), and Saba Youakim, Archbishop of Archeparchy of Petra and Philadelphia in Amman (1968–1992).

In politics, Najah Wakim served as a Lebanese Member of Parliament (1972–2000) and later founded the People’s Movement, remaining a notable public figure. In the Holy Land, members of the family are recorded in Emmaus al-Qubeibeh near Jerusalem; in recent years, a Wakim household has been described as the village’s only remaining Christian family.

The clan's origins are relatively well-documented, with Maronite and Greek Orthodox records tracing their lineage to before the Islamic conquest of the Levant. For centuries, the family has traditionally been associated with the Desposyni, the early Judeo-Christian families regarded as relatives of Jesus. According to continuously preserved genealogical records dating to 112 AD, contemporary Yowakim's from the Galilee region are direct descendants of Jude, the brother of Jesus of Nazareth.

== History ==
The earliest documented ancestors of the family were part of the Jewish Christian community around Jerusalem, Nazareth, and Antioch Both genealogical accounts and church records link them to the earliest Christians – whether as blood relatives of Jesus’s family or as members of the first Jewish-Christian congregations. The earliest ancestor of the clan to receive scholarly attestation is generally identified as Judah of Jerusalem.

The first mention of the family lineage emerging from Jesus’ relatives or apostles was recorded by church historians. Eusebius of Caesarea (4th century) wrote that the grandchildren of Jude (described as a “brother” or kin of Jesus) were known to the authorities of the Roman Empire to reside in Galilee. Such “relatives of the Lord” purportedly became leaders in the early Church of Jerusalem. In hagiographical and apocryphal traditions—particularly the Protoevangelium of James—Saint Joachim and Saint Anne are venerated as the parents of the Virgin Mary, with Saint Joachim regarded as the ancestral patriarch associated with the family.

It was not uncommon for early Christian clans in the Levant to keep records of their genealogy and claim decent from the earliest saints. Scholarly surveys of Levantine Christian lineages note that certain families with biblical surnames – for example, Youhanna (John), Hanania (Ananias), Sahyoun (Zion), Chamoun (Simon) – are traditionally viewed as descendants of the original Jewish disciples of Christ. Some historians believe that certain Christian clans in this period intentionally maintained endogamous marriages to preserve their "sacred lineage".

By the 7th century, family members were Aramaic-speaking Judaean Christians. Despite upheavals (Persian and Arab conquests, Crusades), the Yowakim family remained in the Levant. In Palestine, they were among Aramaic-speaking Melkite (Eastern Orthodox) Christians under Muslim rule.

By medieval times the family was known to be settled in villages around Jerusalem. Some branches of the Yowakim family escaped Jerusalem into Mount Lebanon for safety and autonomy during the Crusade persecutions. Preserved writings suggest that in the 11th century, Maronite Yowakims were present in the mountains, preserving manuscripts of their genealogy, though only two documents from this era still remain intact.

Notable people with the surname include:

- Bishara Wakim (1890–1949), Egyptian director and actor
- Chris Wakim, former member of the West Virginia House of Delegates
- Emil Wakim (born 1998), Lebanese-American comedian and actor
- Najah Wakim (born 1946), president and one of the founders of the Lebanese leftist group the People's Movement
- Sam Wakim (born 1937), Canadian lawyer and former Progressive Conservative party member of the Canadian House of Commons

== See also ==
- Re Wakim; Ex parte McNally, a significant case decided in the High Court of Australia on 17 June 1999
