= List of Egyptian films of the 1920s =

The following is an incomplete list of Egyptian films before 1930. For an A-Z list of films currently on Wikipedia, please see Category:Egyptian films.

== 1920s ==
Arabic title	English translation	Director	Cast	Notes	IMDb profile
1923
Fi bilad Tout Ankh Amoun في بلاد توت عنخ أمون	In the Land of Tutankhamun	Victor Rosito	Fawzi Mounib, John Marbert, Aristidie Hag Andrea		
Barsoum Yabhas Aen Wazifa برسوم يبحث عن وظيفة	Barsoum Looking for a Job	Mohamed Bayoumi	Fawzi Mounib	silent	
1924
Al-Bashkateb الباشكاتب	The Head Clerk	Mohamed Bayoumi	Amin Atallah	silent	
1927
Laila ليلى	Laila	Wedad Orfi & Stéphane Rosti	Aziza Amir, Wedad Orfi	first Egyptian motion picture	
1928
Qoublah fil sahara قبلة في الصحراء	Kiss in the Desert	Ibrahim Lama	Badr Lama, Ibrahim Zoulficar		
Souad al-ghagariyyah سعاد الغجرية	Souad the Gypsy	Jacques Schutz	Fardous Hassan, Abdel Aziz Khalil		
Al-Bahr beyedhak leih البحر بيضحك ليه	Why Is the Sea Laughing?	Stéphane Rosti	Stéphane Rosti, Amine Atallah		
Fagui'ah fawq al-haram فاجعة فوق الهرم	Tragedy at the Pyramids	Ibrahim Lama	Fatma Rouchdi, Badr Lama		
Al-Dahiyyah الضحية	The Victim	Wedad Orfi	Hosni Ibrahim, Ehsane Sabri		
Sani' al-qabaqib صانع القباقيب	The Clog Maker	Amine Atallah	Amine Atallah, Iris Staney		
1929
Bint al-Nil بنت النيل	Daughter of the Nile	Aziza Amir	Aziza Amir, Ahmed Allam		
Ghadat al-sahara غادة الصحراء	The Desert Belle	Wedad Orfi & Ahmed Galal	Assia Dagher, Wedad Orfi		
Ma'sat al-hayah مأساة الحياة	The Tragedy of Life	Wedad Orfi	Wedad Orfi, Efranz Hanem		
Al-Moukhatarah al-aguibah المخاطرة العجيبة	The Strange Adventure	Gabriel Rogeogian	Odette Reynolds, Aristidie Hag Andrea		
Goha جحا	Goha	Jacques Schutz	Gabriel Naoum, Fouad Helmi		
Al-Moukhaddarat المخدرات	Narcotics	Hassan al-Halbawi	Abdel Salam al-Naboulsi, Assia Dagher		
