= Hanania =

Family name

Hanania family عائلة حنانيا
- Levantine Christian family
- Current region: Palestine/Israel, Jordan, Lebanon; diaspora in the Americas, Europe, Oceania
- Origin: Jerusalem (Ottoman Palestine)
- Members: Jurji Ḥabīb Hanania; Anastas Hanania; Daoud Hanania; Ghazi Hanania; Ray Hanania; Tony Hanania; Amira Hanania; Richard Hanania
- Traditions: Arabic-speaking; Greek Orthodox (Rum Orthodox) affiliation

The Hanania surname (Arabic: حنانيا) is a Levantine family name historically centered in Jerusalem, some of whom may have had ancestors with a presence there from the 1st century AD through the British Mandate and the Jordanian era.

Notable people with the surname include the newspaper founder Jurji Ḥabīb-Hanania (established the first Arabic newspaper in Jerusalem, "al-Quds" in 1908); Jordanian attorney and diplomat Anastas Hanania and his, cardiac surgeon and former Jordanian Parliament member Daoud Hanania; dentist and Palestinian Fatah legislator Ghazi Hanania; American journalist and stand-up comedian Ray Hanania; novelist Tony (Antonios) Hanania; diplomat/filmmaker Amira Hanania; American political writer Richard Hanania.

== History ==
The surname Hanania (Arabic: حنانيا) derives from the Aramaic given name Hananyah, meaning “God has been gracious.” The name appears in Jewish and early Christian sources, including references to Hananiah (Ananias) in the Bible, and was used to associate lineage with the saint. The use of Hananyah as a name among Levantine Christians developed into a hereditary surname in Arabic-speaking regions, where it has been borne almost exclusively by Christian families.

Jurji Habib Hanania's family oral traditions maintain that their Hanania lineage can be traced to early Jewish converts to Christianity in first-century Jerusalem, referred to as Jewish Christians, while acknowledging that no official records provide confirmation. Wine and oil jugs inscribed with their name “Hanania”, found on archaeological digs in the Jerusalem area, are the basis for suggesting the presence of individuals bearing the name.

By the Ottoman period, the Habib Hanania branch of the family was well established in Jerusalem and recognized as part of the city’s long-standing Greek Orthodox Christian community. Historical accounts describe the Habib Hananias as one of Jerusalem’s notable Christian families, rooted in the city for several generations. The Habib Hanania branch distinguished itself from unrelated families of similar name by adopting a double-barreled form of the surname.

Members of the Habib-Hanania family rose to prominence during the late Ottoman and British Mandate periods through careers in law, education, publishing, and public service. ʿIssa Habib Hanania served as the only Christian judge on Jerusalem’s Supreme Court in the late nineteenth century, while his son, Jurji Habib Hanania (1864–1920), founded the Arabic newspaper Al-Quds in 1908, marking a milestone in Palestinian journalism. 'Issa's other son, Yaqub, studied at the Greek Orthodox Divinity School in Jerusalem, then travelled to Russia as he had been hired to tutor the tsars' daughter in Hebrew. Later generations continued in public life, notably Anastas Hanania (1903–1995), who became a Jordanian minister, diplomat, and signatory of the 1952 Constitution of Jordan and his son Dr. Daoud Hanania (born 1934), a cardiac surgeon and director of the King Hussein Medical Center in Amman.

Following the 1948 Arab–Israeli War, West Jerusalem was governed by Jordan. The family’s dispersion led to several regional branches: in Jordan (Amman), where they integrated into professional and public life; in Lebanon, where figures such as Professor Farid S. Hanania (1908–2007) taught international law at the American University of Beirut; and in the Americas, where early emigrants such as George John Hanania (1901–1987) settled in the United States and founded a family line that includes journalist Ray Hanania (born 1953).

Today, members of the Hanania family remain active in public, academic, and cultural life across the Middle East and the global Palestinian diaspora, maintaining an identity rooted in their historical association with Jerusalem’s Christian community.

== Notable individuals ==
- Anastas Hanania (1903–1995), Palestinian-Jordanian lawyer
- Daoud Hanania (born 1934), Jordanian heart surgeon
- Ghazi Hanania (born 1945), politician
- Ray Hanania (born 1953), American journalist and stand-up comedian
- Richard Hanania (born 1985), American political commentator

== See also ==
- Beit Hanania, moshav in Israel
- Hanania Baer (born 1943), Israeli cinematographer
- Wakim (Levantine family)
