= Bint el-Basha el-Mudir =

- بنت الباشا المدير
- Directed by: Ahmed Galal
- Written by: Ahmed Galal
- Starring: Assia Dagher; Mary Queeny; Ahmad Galal; Mohsen Sarhan
- Release date: January 14, 1938
- Running time: 115
- Country: Egypt
- Language: Arabic

Bint el-Basha el-Mudir (Arabic: بنت الباشا المدير, lit. “Daughter of the Pasha in Charge”) is a 1938 Egyptian film directed by Ahmed Galal.

== Synopsis ==
The story is a tragic tale of a woman named who disguises herself as a man to support her family after her brother dies in an accident en route to work. The children of a Pasha, named Badriya and Tewfik, who she has been teaching under her real name of Hikmat Effendi (her tutor brother), grow to love her as part of the family and complications ensue.

== Cast ==
- Assia Dagher (Hikmat)
- Mary Queeny (Badria)
- Ahmad Galal (Tawfik)
- Mohsen Sarhan
- Zeinab Nusrat (Pasha’s wife)
- Ahmed Darwish (Jaafar Pasha)
- Wajih Al-Arabi (Pasha’s son)
- Abdel Mona'em Saoudi
- Fouad Al-Masry
- Ali Ghalib (Bayoumi Effendi)
