= Uyun sahira =

- عيون ساحرة
- Directed by: Ahmed Galal
- Written by: Ahmed Galal
- Produced by: Assia Dagher
- Starring: Assia Dagher; Mary Queeny; Ahmad Galal; Abdel Salam Al Nabulsy; Youssef Saleh
- Production company: Lotus Films
- Distributed by: Behna Films
- Release date: February 8, 1934
- Running time: 125
- Country: Egypt
- Language: Egyptian Arabic

Uyun sahira (Arabic: عيون ساحرة, lit. “Bewitching Eyes”) is a 1934 Egyptian film directed by Ahmed Galal. It is often considered the first Egyptian horror film, and caused some controversy at the time.

== Synopsis ==
Delilah, a singer, seems at first to be in mutual love with a young man named Sami, but her club won't let him in much, and he grows distant while she grows fonder. She accosts him demanding he reconsider, jumping into his car as he leaves the club. Sami's car crashes, throwing him to his death, but Delilah escapes. Heartbroken and traumatized, she visits his grave in the dead of night and performs occult rituals to revive him. Sami's ghost appears and instructs her to inject the blood of a virgin girl into the corpse to reincarnate him. Delilah, whose eyes are famously captivating, roams around Cairo until she happens upon a destitute lottery ticket seller named Hayat, proceeding to lead her back to Sami's grave. Once she completes the transfusion, Delilah realizes the girl is channeling Sami's emotions; Sami pinches Delilah's arm and tries to escape with Hayat, leading a new love between the two to break the spell and dash Delilah's dreams once more. Delilah is awoken by her maid to find it was all a dream.

== Cast ==
- Assia Dagher (Delilah)
- Ahmad Galal (Sami)
- Abdel Salam Al Nabulsy
- Mary Queeny (Hayat)
- Youssef Saleh

== Production ==
The director, Ahmed Galal (1897–1947), married actress and producer Mary Queeny in 1940, and they co-founded of Galal Studios in Cairo in 1940.

The 28th feature film released in Egypt and a first for speculative fiction, the film was a breakthrough by the standards of the time. The subject matter, regarding the soul and death, was subject to controversy. Some government censors and scholars at Al-Azhar University, including the latter's Grand Imam Muhammad al-Ahmadi al-Zawahiri, considered the film sacrilegious. They were overruled by the Prime Minister, Abdel Fattah Yahya Pasha, who authorized screening on the grounds that the heroine was dreaming all along. Public reception was largely positive, and the film was a box office success.
