= The Beauty from Peran =

- Directed by: Vedat Örfi Bengü; Orestis Laskos
- Written by: Orestis Laskos; Tymfristos (novel)
- Produced by: Namik Kiliçoglu; Hristos Maniatis
- Cinematography: Manasi Filmeridis
- Music by: Yiannis Vellas
- Production companies: Panellinios Film Company; Yeni Film
- Release date: 1953
- Running time: 99 minutes
- Countries: Greece; Turkey
- Language: Greek

The Beauty from Peran (Greek: Η ομορφιά από τον Περάν, Turkish: Beyoğlu güzeli) is a 1953 Greek-Turkish romance film directed by Vedat Örfi Bengü and Orestis Laskos and starring Katia Linta, Süha Dogan and Muazzez Arçay.

== Cast ==
- Katia Linta as Ermioni
- Süha Dogan as Aimilios Irakleitos
- Muazzez Arçay
- Mesut Sürmeli
- Muazzez Dogan
- Lilian Gris
- Jenny Diamanti
- E.P. Karli
- Mimis Mihalopoulos
- Renos Vrettakos

== Bibliography ==
- Agâh Özgüç. Türk sinemasında İstanbul. Horizon International, 2010.
