= Laila (1927 film) =

1927 film

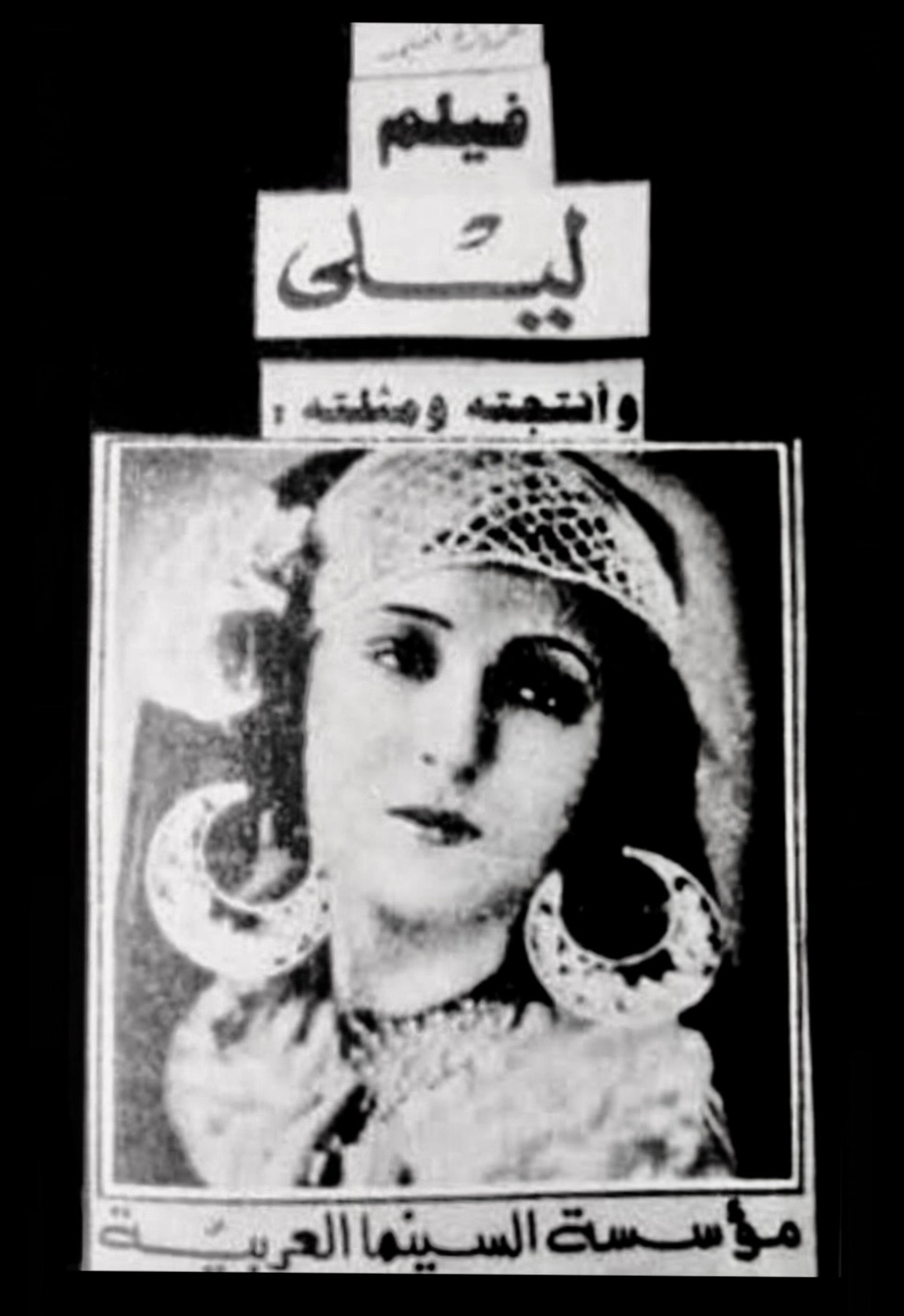
- Theatrical release poster
- Directed by: Stephan Rosti; Wedad Orfi
- Written by: Wedad Orfi; Stephan Rosti
- Produced by: Aziza Amir
- Starring: Aziza Amir; Stephan Rosti; Assia Dagher; Vedat Örfi Bengü; Hussein Fawzi
- Cinematography: Hassan El-Helbawi
- Edited by: Aziza Amir
- Production company: Isis Film
- Release date: 16 November 1927 (Egypt)
- Running time: 90 minutes
- Country: Egypt
- Language: Egyptian Arabic

Laila is a 1927 Egyptian silent film directed by Stephan Rosti and Wedad Orfi. It stars Aziza Amir, Stephan Rosti and Assia Dagher. It is the first feature-length Egyptian film.

== Plot ==
In the middle of a barren desert, Laila grows up in a quiet oasis overlooked by the ruins of ancient Memphis. It is the village where the rich businessmen Raouf Bey lives. He meets Laila and admires her and tries to please her, but she is in love with Ahmed, who previously saved her from falling into the clutches of Salem when he tried to assault her. Ahmed gets engaged to Laila, after which he meets a Brazilian female tourist staying in a hotel near the village. The girl succeeds in making Ahmed fall in love with her and takes him from Laila, who is pregnant from Ahmed. The village people discover Laila's pregnancy and expel her. While Laila is walking helplessly, she is hit by a car. She discovers that its driver is Raouf Bey, who carries her to his house to give birth, and she dies while giving birth to her child.

== Cast ==
- Aziza Amir as Laila
- Stephan Rosti as Raouf Bey
- Assia Dagher as Teacher
- Wedad Orfi as Sheikh Ahmed
- Hussein Fawzi as Alcaballero de Fernandez
- Alice Lazar as The Brazilian girl
- Bamba grimaced as Salma
- Ahmed Lail as The servant
- Ahmed Al-Sharaieb as The doctor
- Mary Mansour as The nurse
- Ahmed Galal as Salem

== Production ==
In production stage, the film was scheduled to be produced under the name The Call of God. Filming was stopped due to producer Aziza Amir being dissatisfied with the scenes filmed by Wedad Arfi, and as a result, filming was completed by Stephan Rosti, and the film's name was changed to Laila. The film was developed and printed at the film producer's home, which was turned into a studio on El-Bargas Street in the Garden City neighborhood. The external scenes were filmed between the Giza Pyramids, Saqqara, and the streets of Cairo.

== Reception ==
Among those attending the film's premiere were the economist Talaat Harb and the musician Mohamed Abdel-Wahab. The premier of the film was attended by the prominent poet Ahmed Shawqi who praised the artist Aziza Amir by saying, “She did what men were unable to do.”

== See also ==
- Egyptian cinema
- List of Egyptian films of the 1920s
