= Ghadat al-sahara =

Ghadat al-Sahara
- Directed by: Wedad Orfi
- Written by: Wedad Orfi
- Produced by: Assia Dagher
- Starring: Mary Queeny; Assia Dagher
- Cinematography: Coronel
- Production company: Lotus Film
- Release date: 1 May 1929 (Egypt)
- Running time: 95 minutes
- Country: Egypt
- Language: Egyptian Arabic

Ghadat al-sahara is a 1929 Egyptian silent film starring Mary Queeny in her debut role and Assia Dagher. It is directed by Wedad Orfi. The film is also the first production of the actress and filmmaker Assia Dagher.

== Synopsis ==
The sheikh of one of the tribes likes Salma, a girl from one of the Bedouin tribes, who is engaged to her cousin Ali bin Zaid. The sheikh kidnaps her and marries her by force and she gives birth to a child from him. After a while, Salma escapes with her child with the help of the servant Suleiman, whose malicious intentions become clear when he tries to assault her. Salma gets rid of his evil by killing him and flees back home to her tribe.

== Cast ==
- Mary Queeny
- Sabry Farid
- Wedad Orfi
- Assia Dagher
- Hend Younes
- Abdel Salam Al Nabulsy
- Goswanson
- Farid Bek Khairy

== See also ==
- Culture of Egypt
- Egyptian cinema
- List of Egyptian films of the 1920s
