= Assia Dagher =

Lebanese-Egyptian actress and film producer

- آسيا داغر
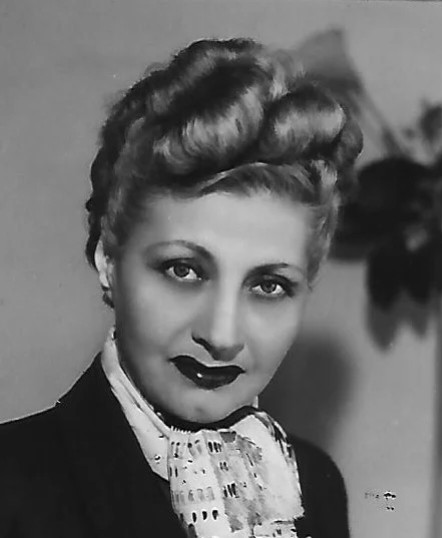
- Born: Almaza Dagher; 6 March 1908; Tannourine, Lebanon
- Died: 12 January 1986 (aged 77); Cairo, Egypt
- Occupations: Actress, film producer

Assia Dagher (Arabic: آسيا داغر; 6 March 1908 – 12 January 1986) was a Lebanese-Egyptian actress and film producer.

== Biography ==
Dagher (Almaza Dagher) was born in Tannourine, Lebanon on 6 March 1908. She moved to Cairo with her sister Mary, and niece Mary Queeny in 1919, when she was only 11 years old, after the French occupation of Syria and Lebanon. She stayed with Asaad Dagher, her cousin, who was a writer and journalist at the famous Al-Ahram newspaper. She got the Egyptian nationality in 1933.

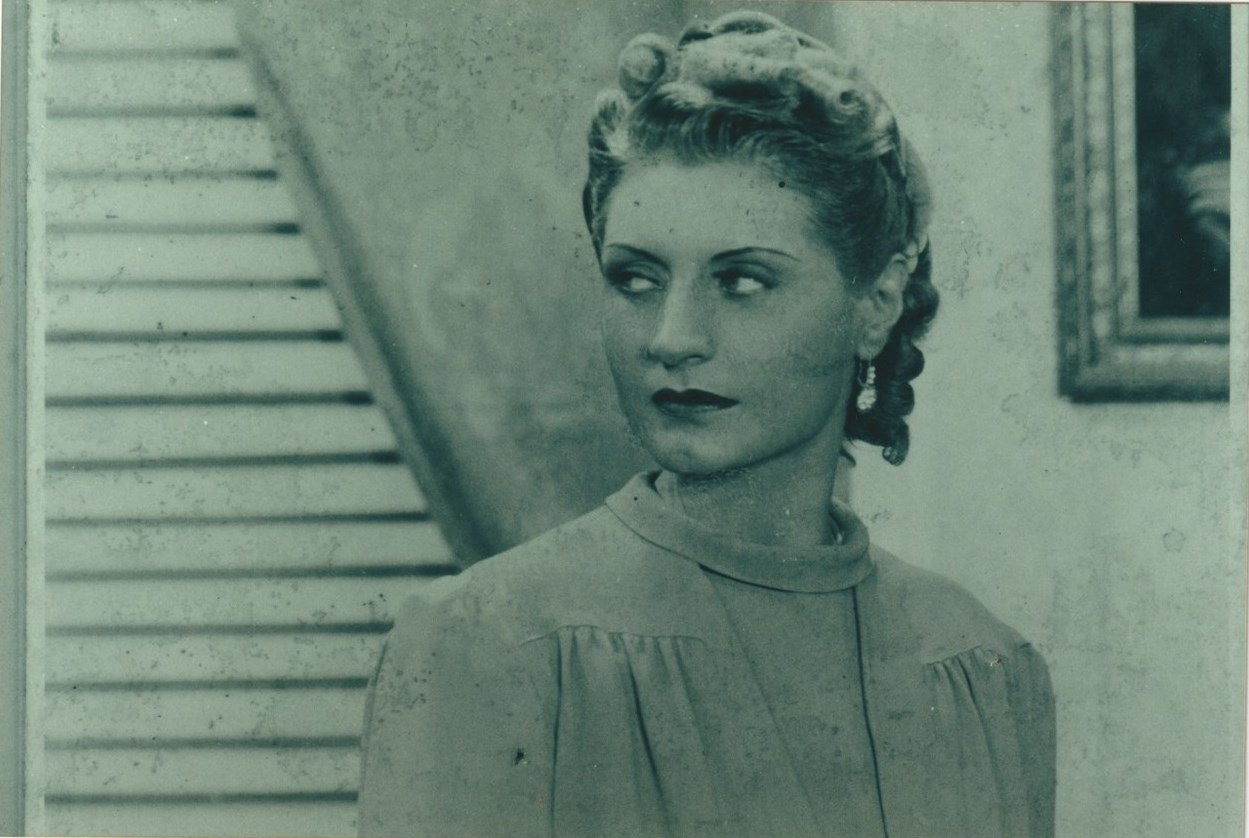
Assia Dagher in The Fifth Groom (1942)

The first time she acted was in 1927 in a film called Laila, directed by Wadad Orfi, and starring Aziza Amir. Dagher was the first Lebanese to be on the big screen. She produced over 100 films including Return My Heart (1957) and Saladin the Victorious (1963) and played the lead role in only 20 of them.

== Filmography ==
=== As producer ===
Ghadat al-sahara	(1929)	غادة الصحراء	The Desert Belle (International: English title)
Uyun sahira	(1934)	عيون ساحرة	Bewitching Eyes (International: English title)
Shajarat al-durr	(1935)	شجرة الدر	Queen Shajarat al-Durr (International: English title)
The Pretty Mothers-in-law	(1954)	الحماوات الفاتنات	The Pretty Mothers-in-law (International: English title)
Return My Heart	(1957)	رد قلبي	Back Again (International: English title)
Saladin the Victorious	(1963)	الناصر صلاح الدين	Saladin the Victorious (International: English title)

=== As actress ===
Laila	(1927)	ليلى	Laila (International: English title)
Ghadat al-sahara	(1929)	غادة الصحراء	The Desert Belle (International: English title)
Wakhz el damir	(1932)	وخز الضمير	A Guilty Conscience (International: English title)
Endama toheb el maraa	(1933)	عندما تحب المرأة	When a Woman Loves (International: English title)
Uyun sahira	(1934)	عيون ساحرة	Bewitching Eyes (International: English title)
Shajarat al-durr	(1935)	شجرة الدر	Queen Shajarat al-Durr (International: English title)
Banknote	(1936)	بنكنوت	Banknote (International: English title)
Zawja bil nayaba	(1937)	زوجة بالنيابة	Wife in Waiting (International: English title)
Bint el-Basha el-Mudir	(1938)	بنت الباشا المدير	Daughter of the Pasha in Charge (International: English title)
Fattich an el-mar'a	(1939)	ابحث عن المرأة	Look for the Woman (International: English title)
Zelekha tuhib Achur	(1939)	زليخة تحب عاشور	Zelkha Loves Ashour (International: English title)
Fatat mutamarrida	(1940)	فتاة متمردة	A Rebellious Girl (International: English title)
El-arris el-khamis	(1941)	العريس الخامس	The Fifth Suitor (International: English title)
Imra'a khatira	(1941)	إمرأة خطيرة	Dangerous Woman (International: English title)
El-charid	(1942)	الشريد	The Wanderer (International: English title)
El-muttahama	(1942)	المتهمة	The Suspect (International: English title)
Law kunt ghani	(1942)	لو كنت غني	If I Were Rich (International: English title)
Imma guinan	(1944)	اما جنان	What Madness! (International: English title)
El-qalb louh wahid	(1945)	القلب له واحد	The Heart Has Its Reasons (International: English title)
Haza ganahu abi	(1945)	هذا جناه أبي	This Was My Father's Crime (International: English title)
El-hanim	(1946)	الهانم	The Lady (International: English title)
