= Judah Kyriakos =

Last Jewish Bishop of Jerusalem

Judah Kyriakos, also known popularly as Judas of Jerusalem, was the great-grandson of Jude, brother of Jesus, and the fifteenth Bishop of Jerusalem, according to Epiphanius of Salamis and Eusebius of Caesarea. According to those same chroniclers, he was the last Jew to hold the episcopate. He is sometimes regarded as the great-grandnephew of Jesus.

Though the start of his period as bishop of Jerusalem is not known, Judas is said to have lived beyond Bar Kokhba's revolt (132–136), up to about the eleventh year of Antoninus Pius' reign (c. AD 148), though Marcus was appointed bishop of Aelia Capitolina in 135 by the Metropolitan of Caesarea.

He is also mentioned in the apocryphal Letter of James to Quadratus.

== Identity and family background ==
Epiphanius identifies Judah Kyriakos as a great-grandson of Jude, the brother of Jesus, and therefore a descendant of David through the same extended family line as Jesus. In Greek, the epithet Kyriakos means “belonging to the Lord” and functions both as a Christian baptismal name and as a theological way of marking him as one of “the Lord’s people”.

The family of Jesus – his brothers and wider kin – were remembered collectively as the Desposyni. Julius Africanus, quoting traditions from Jesus’ relatives themselves, states that this family preserved its own genealogical records even after Herod destroyed the public archives. He locates them in the Jewish villages of Nazara and Kokhaba in Galilee, from which they travelled through the land preaching and expounding Christ’s Davidic genealogy.

Hegesippus adds that two grandsons of Jude, named Zoker and James, were interrogated by the emperor Domitian as potential royal pretenders but were released when they were recognized as poor Galilean farmers whose expectation of Christ’s kingdom was eschatological, not political. These figures form the generation immediately prior to Judah Kyriakos in the family line.

== Episcopate and the Bar Kokhba revolt ==
Eusebius relates that there were fifteen successive leaders of the Jerusalem church “of Hebrew descent”, all of whom belonged to “the circumcision” and led a community composed entirely of Jewish Christians. He lists James the Just as first, followed by Symeon son of Clopas and then a series of otherwise obscure figures, ending with a fifteenth bishop named Judas.

Eusebius connects the end of this list with the Bar Kokhba revolt (132–135 CE). During Hadrian’s suppression of the revolt, Jerusalem was refounded as the pagan colony Aelia Capitolina, Jews (including Jewish Christians) were banned from the city, and a gentile bishop named Marcus was appointed over the new Christian community.

Later epitomes and modern summaries identify this Judas with Judah Kyriakos, the last Jewish bishop, and state that he lived beyond the Bar Kokhba revolt up to about the eleventh year of Antoninus Pius (c. 148 CE). After 135 he could no longer function as resident bishop of Jerusalem, but retained some episcopal or honorific status within the wider Jewish Christian milieu.

=== Relationship to Jewish Christians ===
The Bar Kokhba revolt devastated Judea and resulted in a shift of Jewish life and learning toward Galilee, with many survivors dispersing to Galilean villages. Eusebius and later writers interpret the expulsion of Jews from Jerusalem and the appointment of gentile bishops as the end of a distinctly Jewish Christian leadership in the city, but not necessarily as the disappearance of Jewish Christianity itself.

== Descendants and later family history ==
Hegesippus’ story of Jude’s grandsons (Zoker and James) presents them as smallholding farmers in the Nazareth area, working a modest plot of land that appears to have remained undivided within the wider “father’s house” of the family. Richard Bauckham argues that this reflects the family farm in Nazareth which had belonged to Joseph and his brother Clopas and continued jointly among their descendants.

Julius Africanus, in turn, describes the Desposyni as operating from Nazara and Kokhaba – both Galilean villages – and travelling throughout Palestine. Combined, these testimonies strongly indicate that by the late 1st and early 2nd centuries the “family of the Lord” was rooted in rural Galilee, even while some members (like James the Just and Symeon) held leadership roles in Jerusalem.

Jude's immediate kin belonged to this Galilean network. Once Jerusalem was closed to circumcised Jews (135 CE), his wider family returned to Nazareth, Kokhaba, and surrounding Galilean villages, where earlier generations already lived and where Jewish Christians remained strong for centuries.

Today, several modern Jewish Christian families—among them the Youhanna (John), Hanania (Ananias), Youakim (Joachim), are recognized as their descendants, with genealogical lines preserved with writings as early as the 2nd century.

Cambridge scholar Richard Bauckham argues that these claims of literal blood relationship were not merely a spiritual figure of speech. He cites figures such as Conon who represent a later descendant of the Desposyni and who appears in the detailed genealogical records of the Youakim clan. He argues, Conon's martyrdom in independent sources corroborates claims that descendants of Jesus’ family continued into the 3rd century, with roots in Nazareth and connections to Jerusalem’s Christian community.

Genealogical Timeline
Period	Summary	Sources
Pre–70 CE	The extended family of Jesus is divided between Nazareth/Kokhaba (rural base) and Jerusalem, where James the Just and later Symeon lead the church.	
70–135 CE	Leadership passes from James to Symeon to a succession ending with Judas (Judah Kyriakos). Other relatives continue as farmer-missionaries in Galilee.	
Post–135 CE	After the loss of Jerusalem and the expulsion of Jews, surviving family members—including the descendants of Judah Kyriakos—integrate into the Galilean Jewish Christians community, maintaining their Davidic ancestry but without a distinct Jerusalem episcopal role.	
