= Barsoum Looking for a Job =

1923 Egyptian silent film

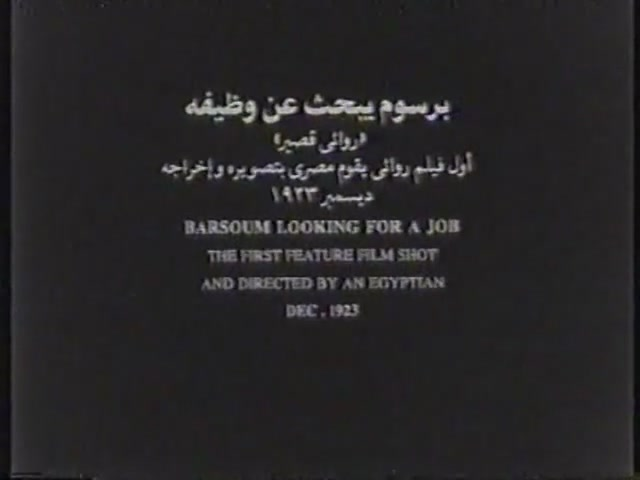
- Directed by: Mohammed Bayoumi
- Written by: Mohammed Bayoumi
- Produced by: Mohammed Bayoumi
- Starring: Bishara Wakim
- Cinematography: Mohammed Bayoumi
- Release date: 31 December 1923 (Egypt)
- Running time: 16 minutes
- Country: Egypt
- Language: Egyptian Arabic

Barsoum Looking for a Job is a 1923 Egyptian silent film written and directed by Mohammed Bayoumi, and stars Bishara Wakim. It is produced by Mohammed Bayoumi and released on 31 December 1923. The film is the first in the history of African cinema.

== Plot ==
Barsoum Looking for a Job (1923)

Barsoum looks for work to feed himself on a newspaper that costs him nothing. Barsoum collects newspapers thrown by a girl by the window. A boy enters the abandoned house where the protagonist sleeps in a straw den, but is beaten by a man who surprises him as he leaves. Barsoum makes the sign of the cross and prays in front of sacred Christian images and the photo of revolution leader Saad Zaghloul. Barsoum does not find bread and is in despair. Barsoum is invited to eat with another man by a wealthy gentleman and they eat with voraciousness and hunger, to the point of raising the food from the fork to the landlord and to a girl who is at the table.

== Cast ==
- Bishara Wakim as Sheikh Metwalli
- Adel Hamid as Barsoum
- Abdel Hamid Zaki as Bank manager
- Victoria Cohen
- Ferdoos Hassan
- Mohamed Youssef as the kid
- Sayed Mostafa
- Ahmed Lail as The servant
- Ahmed Al-Sharaieb as The doctor
- Mary Mansour as The nurse
- Ahmed Galal as Salem

== Overview ==
The topic of this movie is an appeal for tolerance between Muslims and Christians in Egypt during the 1919 revolution. We see Barsoum pray in front of a photograph of Saint Mary, under which there are the crescent, the cross, and the photograph of Saad Zaghloul, the leader of the revolution, showing the motto of unity between Muslims and Christians, one of the slogans of the revolution.

== See also ==
- Egyptian cinema
- African cinema
- List of Egyptian films of the 1920s
