= Ray Hanania =

Palestinian-American journalist and comedian

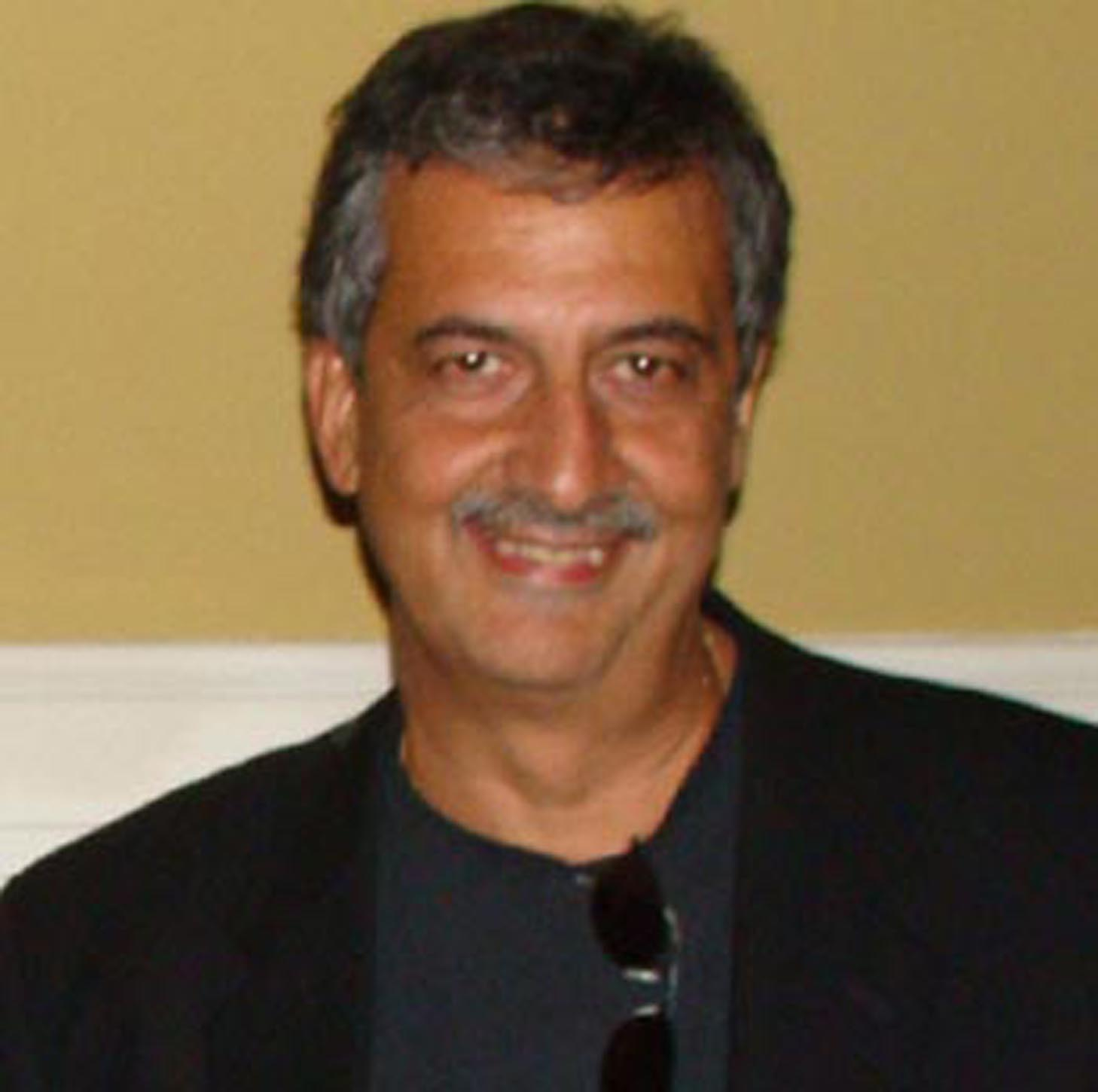
- Ray Hanania
- Born: April 17, 1953 (age 73); Chicago, Illinois
- Education: Northern Illinois University University of Illinois at Chicago
- Awards: Peter Lisagor Award (1985, 2002, 2006, 2009) Sigma Delta Chi Award (2009) Best Ethnic Columnist New America Media (2007)

Ray Hanania (born April 17, 1953) is an American journalist, editor, public relations expert, reporter, and stand-up comedian of Palestinian descent. After the September 11 attacks, he created the Israeli-Palestinian Comedy Tour and Comedy for Peace, which brought together Israeli and Palestinian comedians. He founded his own public relations firm, called Urban Strategies Group.

== Biography ==
=== Early life ===
Hanania was born in Chicago, Illinois, the son of Palestinian Christian (Catholic and Eastern Orthodox) parents. Hanania was raised Lutheran and later became an Orthodox Christian. His mother is from Bethlehem. His father, George, from a prominent Christian family in Jerusalem, served with the U.S. Army during World War II and with the Office of Strategic Services (OSS), the predecessor of the CIA.

Hanania himself served with the U.S. Air Force during the Vietnam War and in the Illinois Air National Guard.

From 1977 to 1985 Hanania reported for the Daily Southtown, and from 1985 to 1992 for the Chicago Sun-Times. Hanania was forced to resign from the Sun-Times in the wake of complaints that he was acting as a behind-the-scenes adviser to Treasurer Miriam Santos, the city's top Hispanic officeholder. Hanania disputes Howard Kurtz's reporting as second and third-hand reporting, and asserts the reasons for the dispute with the Sun-Times was his insistence of being included in a newspaper team reporting on Israel during the First Intifada.

Hanania ran unsuccessfully as a Democratic candidate for the Illinois House of Representatives, 38th District, in 1992.

Hanania currently writes full-time for the Saudi-based Arab News, authoring weekly Opinion Columns on Arab Americans and covering news.

=== Journalism ===
From 1993 to 1996 he was publisher of the suburban Villager Newspapers group, was spokesperson for the Town of Cicero and published the Arab American View, an English-language American Arab newspaper. In 1985 Hanania founded his own public relations firm, Urban Strategies Group, doing media consulting for political, government and private clients including the Town of Cicero. His career in broadcast radio began in 1980 at WLS (AM) until 1992, WJJG AM 1530 (2004–2008) and he hosted The Ray Hanania Show every Sunday morning on WSBC AM 1240 in Chicago and WCFJ AM 1470 in Chicago Heights and the Chicago Southlands. He is also the host of Radio Baladi which broadcasts monthlyevery 2nd Friday morning in Detroit. Hanania later became host of "The Ray Hanania Show" on WNZK AM 690 Radio in Detroit and simulcast on WDMV AM 700 Radio in Washington, D.C., on the US Arab Radio Network.

His internationally syndicated column was distributed by Creators Syndicate from 2002 to 2005, and 2010 until 2016. Currently, Hanania is the US Special Correspondent for The Arab News Newspaper and writes news, features an Op-Ed column every week for the Arab News in Saudi Arabia. Hanania describes his writing as "defining the moderate Palestinian and Arab Voice." He continues to write a Chicago political column carried locally with the Southwest News Newspaper Group (including the Southwest News-Herald, Des Plaines Valley News, The Regional News and The Reporter newspapers), and formerly wrote a weekly column with the Arlington Heights Daily Herald (2002–2009). He has written a humor/serious column for the online website of Yedioth Ahronoth and also for the Jerusalem Post, and currently publishes his columns on his personal website at TheDailyHookah.com.

Earlier in his career, Hanania wrote a weekly syndicated column for the Jerusalem Post and his columns advocated the "moderate Palestinian and Arab voice" and rejected extremism, embraces peace between Palestinians and Israelis, and opposed the use of violence. However, in a November 2012 column for the Saudi Gazette, he wrote "the real obstacle preventing peace is the fundamental refusal of most Israelis and most American Jews to accept the right of Palestinians to exist as a people with a state." Hanania also said that "until Israelis and Jews accept the right of Palestinians to exist, Palestinians have no option but to struggle and resist and defend themselves against violence, land confiscation and theft, and ethnic cleansing from historical Palestine. However, Hanania has committed himself to non-violence, embraces peaceful negotiations and maintains consistently on his web site:

"The best way to fight extremism in the Middle East and bring peace to Israelis and Palestinians is through truth and facts. In my columns, you will read my opinions which provide a balanced view of the conflict, to let you understand the facts and the issues. I don't just criticize Israel. I also criticize the Arabs. I don't just point a finger at Israel and blame them for everything, I also point out the faults of the Arabs, too."

=== Comedy ===
Hanania launched a stand-up comedy career in 2001 to advance his assumption that humor can calm the animosity between Jews and Arabs, promoting peace through moderation. He was featured in a front-page story in The Wall Street Journal and other newspapers. In May 2002, the owner of Zanies Comedy Club in Chicago invited Hanania to perform comedy and enrolled him in comedy classes to hone his stage skills. He performed 35 shows for Zanies. In June, Zanies booked Hanania for a nine-show performance over Labor Day weekend. A few weeks before the show, Zanies owner informed Hanania they were going to add Jewish American comedian Jackie Mason to the bill so he could get stage time before his planned appearances on Broadway.

But hours before the first show, Mason refused to have Hanania open for him. Hanania was called at home as he was leaving for the theater and told not to show up, even though the show had been pre-sold (sold out) a month before. Mason's manager and wife, Jyll Rosenfeld, who was in New York at the time, said that Hanania could not perform because he was "Palestinian" and not Jordanian as Mason had thought. After the controversy broke making international headlines (that lasted seven days), Zanies' management claimed the cancellation was because of Hanania's alleged "inexperience" as a professional comedian, even though Hanania had performed 35 shows for Zanies. But Jyll Rosenfeld told a reporter for the Associated Press that Mason was "uncomfortable" being on the same stage with Hanania because Hanania is a "Palestinian." Hanania later developed a unique Palestinian-Jewish stand-up comedy routine that features his experiences growing up Arab in America and satirizing his marriage to his wife, Alison, who is Jewish. With Israeli comedians Charley Warady and Yisrael Campbell, and African American comedian-journalist Aaron Freeman, he co-founded "The Israeli-Palestinian Comedy Tour", which broke the Arab and Palestinian comedian taboo of refusing to appear with Israelis.

=== Other work ===
Hanania was the national coordinator of the former National American Arab Journalists Association, which coordinates and networks American Arab and Muslim Journalists in the United States, and is a partner affiliate of the Union of Arab American Journalists in Detroit.

As of 2020, Hanania was a senior writer at The Arab Daily News online newspaper, which is self-described as "The Newspaper of Record for the American Arab community".

== Personal life ==
Hanania was married to his ex-wife Melissa until 1990. His current wife, Alison, is Jewish. He has two children: one daughter from his prior marriage who is Catholic, and one son from his current marriage who is Jewish. He lives in Orland Park, Illinois.

== Professional awards ==
- Sigma Delta Chi National Award for Column Writing from the Society of Professional Journalists (2009) for his columns on the alleged discrimination against an Arab grocer in a suburb of Chicago.
- MT. Mehdi "Courage in Journalism Award" 2009 by the Mehdi Family.
- Winner of the First National Ethnic Media Award for Commentary/Editorial Writing (English) in 2006 by the New America Media Association for his three-part series: "Shedding Moonlight on Conflict", "A New Language of Peace" and "Things Palestinians and Israelis Share".
- Society of Professional Journalists Chicago Headline Club, Peter Lisagor Award for Column Writing, 1985, 2002, 2005, 2009.
- Chicago Newspaper Guild Column Writing Award (2 awards 1982, 1984).
- Three awards from the American Arab Anti-Discrimination Committee, two Chicago ADC (1981, 1988) and National ADC, 1985.
- Nominated by the Chicago Sun-Times editors in 1990/91 for a Pulitzer Prize for his four-part series on the Palestinian Intifada.

== Books ==
- PoweR PR: Ethnic Activists Guide to Strategic Communications (2014) Urban Strategies Group. ISBN 978-1-32945011-0
- Arabs of Chicagoland (2005) Arcadia Publishing. ISBN 0-7385-3417-X
- I'm Glad I Look Like a Terrorist: Growing Up Arab in America (1986, updated 2002) ISBN 0-9654761-0-3
- Strike Back: Lentil Soup for the Arab American Soul (1999) USG Publishing. ISBN 0-9654761-1-1
- Midnight Flight: The Story of White Flight in Chicago—1968 (Online novel available at Suburbanchicagoland.com.)
- Troubled Times: Palestinian American Thought before and after Sept. 11th which features 98 of his award-winning columns, paperback;
- The Grape Leaves of Wrath (2012), a parody of the novel The Grapes of Wrath applied to the story of the Palestinian refugees.

== See also ==
- Palestinian Christians
