= Anastas Hanania =

Palestinian politician (1903–1995)

Minister of Justice and Transport
- In office 6 May 1959 – 20 September 1959
- Monarch: Hussein of Jordan
- Prime Minister: Hazza' Majali
- Preceded by: Mohammed Ali Al-Jabari
- Succeeded by: Anwar Al Nashashibi

Minister of Finance
- In office 24 October 1954 – 28 May 1955
- Prime Minister: Tawfik Abu al-Huda
- Preceded by: Abdulrahman Khalifa
- Succeeded by: Bishara Ghosein
- In office 24 April 1957 – 13 July 1957
- Prime Minister: Ibrahim Hashem
- Preceded by: Suleiman Al-Sukar
- Succeeded by: Ahmad Al-Tarawneh

Personal details
- Born: 1903 Jerusalem
- Died: 1995

Anastas Hanania (1903 – 1995) was a Palestinian-Jordanian lawyer, judge, official and diplomat.

Hanania was educated at the Syrian Protestant College in Beirut (now the AUB) and the Law College in Jerusalem. He entered the world of Palestinian politics in the late 1930s and 1940s.

== Career ==
After the 1948 Deir Yassin massacre, Hanania and his family left Palestine for Amman. During the 1950s, Hanania was one of the original signatories to the Constitution of Jordan of 1952, which remains the law of the land today.

Between 1960 and 1966, Hanania was Jordan's Ambassador to the United Kingdom and between 1968 and 1989, he was a Senator in Jordan's Upper House of Parliament.

== Ministerial positions ==
Hanania held several cabinet positions in the Jordanian government including Minister of Finance, Minister of Justice and Foreign Minister

×	Term Start	Term End	Ministry	Government
1	6 May 1959	20 September 1959	Minister of Justice and Transport	Hazza' al-Majali
2	18 May 1958	10 July 1958	Minister of Finance and Economy	Samir al-Rifai
3	12 December 1957	18 May 1958	Minister of Finance	Ibrahim Hashem
4	13 July 1957	12 December 1957	Minister of Finance	Ibrahim Hashem
5	24 April 1957	13 July 1957	Minister of Finance and Economy	Ibrahim Hashem
6	1 April 1956	20 May 1956	Minister of Transport, Construction and Building	Samir al-Rifai
7	8 January 1956	1 April 1956	Minister of Trade, Construction and Building	Samir al-Rifai
8	21 December 1955	7 January 1956	Minister of Trade, Construction and Building	Ibrahim Hashem
9	24 October 1954	28 May 1955	Minister of Finance	Tawfik Abu al-Huda
10	4 May 1954	21 October 1954	Minister of Trade	Tawfik Abu al-Huda
11	5 May 1953	2 May 1954	Minister of Trade	Fawzi al-Mulki
12	8 September 1951	27 September 1952	Minister of Justice, Construction and Building	Tawfik Abu al-Huda
13	25 July 1951	7 September 1951	Minister of Agriculture, Construction and Building	Tawfik Abu al-Huda
14	14 July 1951	25 July 1951	Minister of Trade, Construction and Building	Samir al-Rifai
15	18 April 1951	14 July 1951	Minister of Foreign Affairs	Samir al-Rifai
16	24 March 1951	18 April 1951	Minister of Agriculture, Construction and Building	Samir al-Rifai
17	4 December 1950	24 March 1951	Minister of Construction and Building	Samir al-Rifai
18	14 October 1950	4 Dec 1950	Minister of Construction and Building	Sa`id al-Mufti
19	5 August 1950	11 October 1950	Minister of Refugees, Construction and Building	Sa`id al-Mufti
20	12 April 1950	5 August 1950	Minister of Telegram and Post	Sa`id al-Mufti

== Personal life ==
Hanania's wife Claire Nashawati died in 2002. They had a son (heart surgeon Daoud Hanania) and four daughters (May, Lyne, Louly and Myr).
