= Ahmed Galal (director) =

Egyptian director

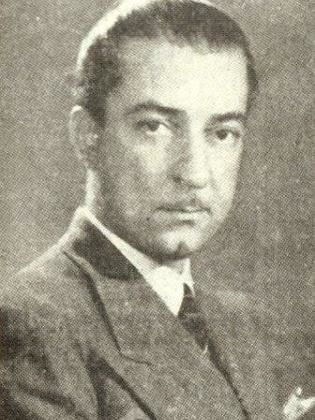
- Born: August 17, 1897
- Died: July 21, 1947 (aged 49)
- Spouse: Mary Queeny
- Children: Nader Galal
- Relatives: Ahmed Nader Galal (grandson)

Ahmed Galal (August 17, 1897 – July 21, 1947) was an Egyptian director, writer, actor, and journalist.

His wife was actress Mary Queeny. Their son, Nader Galal, and grandson, Ahmed Nader Galal, also became directors.

He and his wife co-founded the film studio Galal Studios in Cairo in 1940.

== Filmography ==
Directed features
Year	Title	Ref.
1933	When a Woman Loves	
1934	Bewitching Eyes	
1935	Shajarat al-Durr	
1936	Banknote	
1936	Interim Wife	
1938	Bint el-Basha el-Mudir	
1940	A Girl in Revolt	
