= Daoud Hanania =

Jordanian heart surgeon

Daoud Anastas Hanania (Arabic: داود حنانيا) (born 1934 in Jerusalem) is a Jordanian heart surgeon. Hanania is a former Lieutenant General in the Jordanian Armed Forces and former Senator in the Jordanian Parliament.

== Family background and education ==
Daoud Hanania was born into an Orthodox Christian Palestinian family originally hailed from Jerusalem, Palestine. His father, Anastas Hanania, was a lawyer and politician. The Hananias lived in West Jerusalem until 1948. In the early 1950s they permanently moved to Amman, Jordan, where Hanania's father came to hold several cabinet positions in the Jordanian government, including Foreign Minister, Minister of Justice, Minister for Refugees and Minister of Finance. Anastas Hanania was also Jordan's Ambassador to Great Britain from 1960–1966 and a Senator from 1968 to 1989 in Jordan's Upper House of Parliament.

After completing his primary and secondary education in Jerusalem at al-Ummah College and the College des Frères, Daoud Hanania joined the Jordanian army at age 17. He was sent on a military scholarship to study medicine in England in 1951. Hanania earned his M.B.B.S. medical degree from St. Mary's Hospital Medical School of the University of London in 1957 (St. Mary's has since been incorporated into Imperial College of Science, Technology and Medicine, also at the University of London).

Hanania subsequently became House Surgeon and Surgical Registrar at the Royal Northern Hospital in London from 1959-1961. He specialized in cardiovascular surgery and became a Fellow of the Royal College of Surgeons of England in 1961 (F.R.C.S.), the American College of Surgeons in 1971 (F.A.C.S.), the American College of Cardiology in 1977 (F.A.C.C.), the International College of Angiology in 1979 (F.I.C.A.) and the Royal Society of Medicine in 1980. He also became an Honorary Fellow of the Royal College of Surgeons in Ireland in 1980 (Hon. F.R.C.S.I.), the Royal College of Physicians and Surgeons of Glasgow in 1988 (Hon. F.R.C.S. Glasg) and the Royal College of Surgeons of Edinburgh in 1989.

Hanania trained under Dr. Michael DeBakey and Dr. Denton Cooley in Houston, Texas as a Fellow in Thoracic and Cardiovascular Surgery at Baylor University College of Medicine.

== Career ==
Daoud Hanania performed the first open-heart surgery procedure in Jordan in 1970, the first heart-valve replacement in the country in 1972 as well as the first kidney transplant in the Arab world in the same year and the first coronary artery bypass in Jordan in 1973 and in Iraq some years later. But his most important achievement came in 1985 after performing the first ever successful cardiac transplant in the Middle East and the Arab world at the King Hussein Medical Center in Amman, Jordan.

On the administrative level, Hanania was the Director of the King Hussein Medical Center (KHMC) from 1973-1976. He then became Director of the Royal Medical Services of the Jordan Armed Forces from 1976-1988. Under his leadership, the Royal Medical Services experienced an intensive and steady program of expansion and improvement to become one of the premier institutions of medical care in the region. He was also Chief of Cardiovascular Surgery at KHMC from 1973–1992 and the Director General of the National Medical Institution from 1987-1989.

After retiring from active army duty with the military rank of Lt. General in 1989, Hanania served six terms as a Senator in Jordan's Upper House of Parliament from 1989–1997 and from 2007–2013. He served as Chairman of the Senate Committee on Health, the Environment and Social Development and member of the Senate Foreign Relations Committee.

In addition, he is a member of the American-Jordanian Friendship Society, the British-Jordanian Friendship Society and the Polish-Jordanian Friendship Society.

Hanania was president of the Jordan Cardiac Society and the Arab Cardiac Society from 1988–1990 and was named Clinical Professor of Surgery at the Jordan University of Science and Technology in 1989.

Hanania then played a leading role in the founding of the Arab Center for Heart and Special Surgery (now renamed the Arab Medical Center), an institution he directed from 1991-1999.

Hanania then established the Hanania Medical Center in Amman. He continued to perform cardiovascular surgery operations mostly at the Arab Medical Center and the Khalidi Medical Center and occasionally at the Islamic Hospital and the Amman Surgical Hospital until 2016.

He was appointed as a member of the Board of Trustees of the King Hussein Foundation in 1999 and elected President for Life of the Jordan Cardiothoracic Society in 2005. He is also on the Board of Trustees of al-Quds University and a member of both the Denton A. Cooley Cardiovascular Society and the Michael E. DeBakey International Cardiovascular Society.

On November 23, 2011, he delivered the Annual Memorial Lecture for the 16th Pan-Arab and 8th Jordanian Orthopedic Associations Congress. The lecture, held in Amman, was attended by close to 700 medical professionals.

On January 13, 2021, in a televised event, Hanania was the first person to be officially vaccinated for COVID-19 in Jordan.

== Awards ==
Hanania was appointed an Honorary Knight Commander of the Order of the British Empire (KBE) by Queen Elizabeth II in 1984, the Légion d'honneur by François Mitterrand also in 1984, the Nile Medal First Class of Sudan in 1986, the Insignia of the Commander (First Class) of the Royal Swedish Order by King Carl Gustaf in 1989 and the Medal of the Banner/Bright Star of Taiwan. He was also the first Arab physician to receive the Ben Qurrah Award of the Arab-American-Medical Association-Houston in 1998 for Excellence in Medicine.

He also holds the seven major state decorations in Jordan, the highest being the al-Nahda Medal of the First Order which he received from King Hussein in 1994. Hanania was the first recipient of the Jordan State Recognition Prize for achievements in the fields of science and medicine in 2007. In 2008, he received an award from the Jordan Medical Association. In 2009, Hanania received an award from King Abdullah II in recognition of his contributions to the Royal Medical Services in Jordan.

On May 25, 2021, King Abdullah II bestowed the first centennial medal of the Hashemite Kingdom of Jordan upon Dr. Hanania and other Jordanians.

== Family, friendships and interests ==
Daoud Hanania married Nada Pio in 1974. They have four children.

Hanania was a lifelong friend of the late King Hussein I of Jordan and the late Prince Zeid Bin Shaker, whom he met while the three were students in England.

He enjoys reading and automobile racing. Hanania is a founding member of the Board of Trustees of the Royal Automobile Club in Amman. He is also a tennis enthusiast, having served several terms as President of the Jordan Tennis Federation, during which time Jordan entered Davis Cup competition for the first time.

== Select publications ==
1. D. Hanania and A. Hijazi, “Vascular Injuries”, Jordan Medical Journal
2. (Vol. 3 No. 1, pp. 77–79, May 1968).
3. D. Hanania, “Injuries of the Chest”, Jordan Medical Journal
4. (Vol. 3 No. 2, pp. 81–84, May 1968).
5. D. Hanania, Y. Goussous and S. Saheb, “Congenital Arterio-Venous Fistula of the Kidney”, Jordan Medical Journal (Vol. 6 No.1, pp. 1–5, May 1971).
6. T. Suheimat, D. Hanania, S. Karmi, “Renal Transplantation – Report of a Renal Transplant”, Jordan Medical Journal.
7. (Vol. 7 No. 2, pp. 145–159, November 1972).
8. A. Hanieh and D. Hanania, “The Extra-Cranial Cerebro-Vascular Disease: A Report of a Case Treated Surgically”, Jordan Medical Journal (Vol. 8 No. 1, pp. 77–88, May 1973).
9. D. Hanania, “The King Hussein Medical Center”, Jordan Medical Journal (Vol. 8 No. 2, pp. 206–210, November 1973).
10. B. Akasheh, S. Saleh, D. Hanania, G. Shubailat, and N. Atalla, “Traumatic Non-Penetrating Injury Causing Complete Transection of the Thoracic Aorta and Rupture of the Right Dome of the Diaphragm – A Case Report”, Jordan Medical Journal
11. (Vol. 9 No. 1, pp. 54–60, May 1974).
12. Y. Goussous, N. Harbi, H. Zureikat, A. Hijazi, S. Saleh, and D. Hanania, “Results of the First 158 Cases of Isolated Replacement of the Mitral and Aortic Valves in Jordan”, Cardio-Pulmonary Medicine: The Bulletin of the American College of Chest Physicians (Vol. 15 No. 4, pp. 20–23, October 1976).
13. A. Hiyari, D. Hanania and A. Hijazi, “Aortic Aneurysm in Behcet’s Disease”, Jordan Medical Journal (Vol. 12 No. 2, pp. 44–48, November, 1977).
14. N. Harbi, Y. Goussous, H. Zureikat, S. Saleh and D. Hanania, “Clinical Non-Invasive and Invasive Findings in 50 Patients with Mitral Valve Prolapse”. Non-Invasive Cardiovascular Diagnosis-Current Concepts (University Park Press, Baltimore, pp. 399–409, 1978).
15. D. Hanania, “ A Decade of Open Heart Surgery in Jordan”, Journal of the Irish College of Physicians and Surgeons (Vol. 10 No. 4, April 1981).
16. A. Hijazi, B. Akasheh and D. Hanania, “Aortic Rupture Following Non-Penetrating Trauma”, Jordan Medical Journal
17. (Vol. 16 No. 2, pp. 145–154, November 1982).
18. D. Hanania, Y. Goussous, S. Al-Jitawi, N. Abu-Aishah and H. Nesheiwat, “Cardiac Transplant First Operation in the Middle East: Case Report”, Arab Journal of Medicine (Vol. 5 No. 3, pp. 4–7, March 1986).
19. D. Hanania, S. Al-Jitawi, B. Akasheh, N. Abu-Aisha, “Cardiac Transplantation: The Initial Jordan Experience”, Saudi Heart Bulletin (Vol. 1 No. 1, pp. 11–15, October 1989).
20. JP Veinot, D. Elstein, D. Hanania, A. Abrahamov, S. Srivatsa, A. Zimran. "Gaucher’s disease with valve calcification: Possible role of Gaucher cells, bone matrix proteins and integrins." Canadian Journal of Cardiology (1999; 15(2): 211-216).
21. D. Hanania and B. Akasheh, "Cardiac Surgery in Jordan, 'A Developing Country.'" In Surgery for All: Surgical Cost Consciousness in the Developing World (Ferozons Limited & MacMillan Publishers Ltd.)
22. S. Kabbani, M. Izzat, H. Jamil, B. Akasheh, D. Hanania, and H. Raffa. "Left Ventricular Volume Reduction Surgery in the Middle East." Asian Cardiovasc Thorac Ann (2003 11: 99-101).
