= Ghazi Hanania =

Palestinian politician

- غازي حنانيا

Second Deputy Speaker of the Palestinian Legislative Council
- In office 1998 – 18 February 2006
- Succeeded by: Hasan Khreisheh

Chairman of the Board of The Palestinian Center for Development and Media Freedoms

Chairman of the Board of Sheikh Zayed Trauma Center

Member of the Palestinian Legislative Council for Ramallah and al-Bireh Governorate
- In office 7 March 1996 – 18 February 2006

Member of the Palestinian Health Council

Chairman of the Board of the Union of Ramallah People
- Incumbent
- Assumed office 1994

Personal details
- Born: 3 August 1945 (age 80) Ramallah, Palestine
- Party: Fatah
- Occupation: Politician, dentist

Ghazi Hanania (Arabic: غازي حنانيا; born 3 August 1945) is a Palestinian politician and dentist. He served as the second deputy speaker of the Palestinian Legislative Council and was a member of the Palestinian Legislative Council. He is a member of Fatah.

Born to a Christian family, Dr. Hanania was elected as the second deputy speaker of the Palestinian Legislative Council.

Born in Ramallah on 3 August 1945, to a Christian family, Ghazi attended Al- Al Ahliya School in Ramallah and the Coptic School in Jerusalem (Palestine).

Chairman of board of The Palestinian Center for Development and Media Freedom.

Dr. Hanania was the chairman of the board of the Sheikh Zayed trauma center in Ramallah, He inaugurated the Abu Raya Rehab Center in Ramallah, Palestine.

Ghazi has been a member of Palestinian Health Council and the Union of Ramallah People since 1992 and Chairman of the Board of the Union of Ramallah People since 1994.

Dr. Hanaia is a member of the board of many business and cooperations in Palestine.

Political offices
Preceded by –	Second Deputy Speaker of the Palestinian Legislative Council; 1998–2006	Succeeded by Hasan Khreisheh
