= Bishara Wakim =

Egyptian actor (1890–1949)

- بشارة واكيم
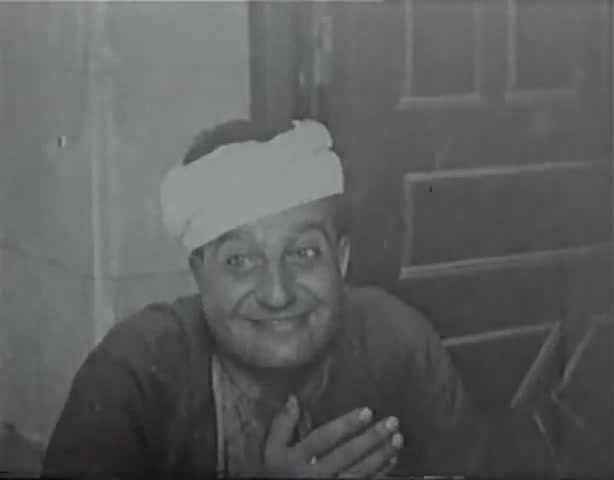
- Bishara Wakim
- Born: Bisharah Yoakim; March 5, 1890; Cairo, Egypt
- Died: 30 November 1949 (aged 59); Cairo, Egypt
- Occupations: director, actor in 381 films

Bishara Wakim (Arabic: بشارة واكيم) (March 5, 1890 – November 30, 1949) was an Egyptian director and actor born in Faggala, Cairo in 1890.

== Career ==
Wakim, born Bisharah Yoakim, was a Greek Catholic. He was educated in Collège-des-Frères (Bab-El-Louk), and in 1917 graduated from the School of Law and he started his life as a lawyer.

He began his acting career as a member of the Abdul Rahman Rushdi theater group, then became a member of George Abiad theater group, and later worked with Egyptian actor Youssef Wahbi in his Ramses theatre group. He then moved to the Mounira El Mahdeya theater as actor, director and technical director.

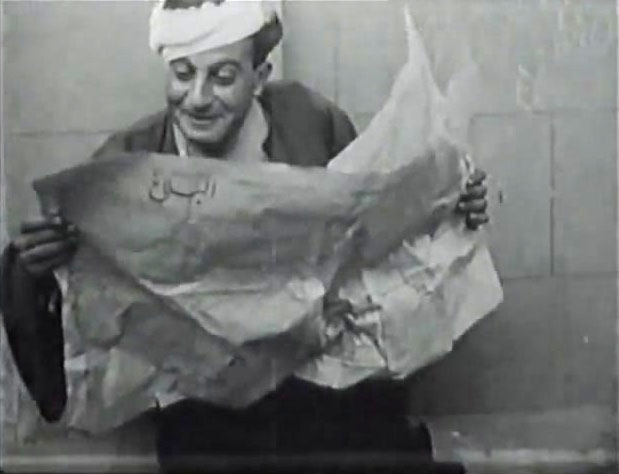
Wakim in Barsoum Looking for a Job (1923)

In 1923, Wakim starred in Barsoum Looking for a Job, one of the notable films of the Egyptian silent film era. He was honored by the Egyptian government for his achievements in film and theater, played the role of the Lebanese in most of the Egyptian movies of the thirties and the forties.

Bishara Wakim made about 381 films in the Egyptian cinema. He died on November 30, 1949.

== Filmography ==
- 1923 Barsoum Looking for a Job
- 1934 The Son of the People
- 1936 Radio Song
- 1945 Beginning of the Month
- 1943 The Son of the Country
- 1944 Berlanti
- 1947 The Son of the Middle
- 1941 Triumph of Youth
- 1942 Ibn El-balad
- 1942 Bahbah Baghdad
- 1944 Berlanti
- 1947 Elbremo
- 1947 Lebanese University
- 1946 I'm Not An Angel
- 1946 Game of the Six
- 1942 If You're Rich
- 1945 Great Artist
- 1947 Baghdad, Cairo
- 1947 Qublni Oh Father
- 1945 Love Story
- 1943 Issue of the Day
- 1947 Alby Dalily
- 1947 And My Heart Weeps
- 1945 Bloody Hearts
- 1947 Alohm Mask

== See also ==
- List of Egyptians
