= People's Movement (Lebanon) =

People's Movement حركة الشعب
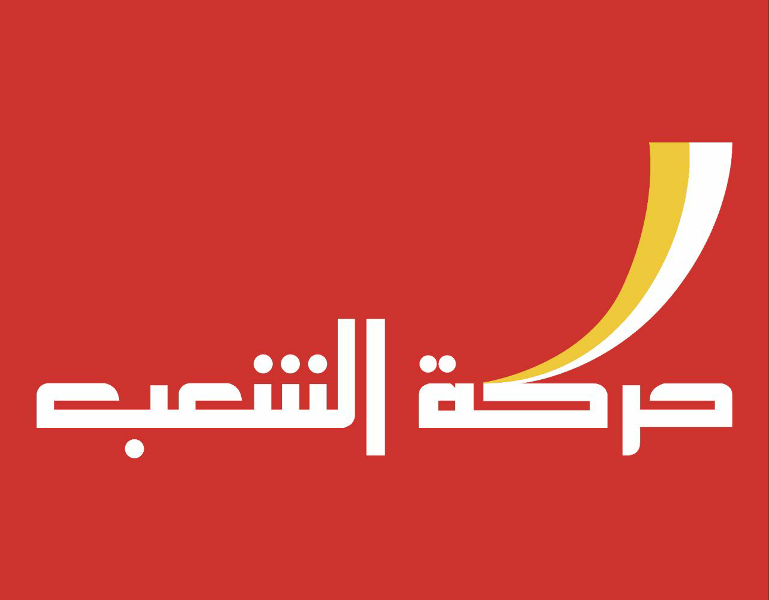
- Abbreviation: SHAAB
- Founder: Najah Wakim
- Founded: 2000; 26 years ago
- Headquarters: Beirut
- Ideology: Socialism; Arab nationalism Anti-Americanism; Anti-Zionism
- Political position: Left-wing
- National affiliation: March 8 Alliance
- Colors: and
- Parliament of Lebanon: 0 / 128

Website
- http://www.shaabonline.org/

The People's Movement of Lebanon (PML, Arabic: حركة الشعب Harakat Al-Shaeb, Arabic acronym HSB) is a democratic leftist political party with no seats in the Lebanese Parliament. The party's founder, Najah Wakim, won parliamentary representation in 1972, but boycotted elections in 2000 and failed to win afterward, leaving the party with no representation in government. The party was founded in 2000 and has recently elected a new leader, Ibrahim al-Halabi. It is a member of the March 8 Alliance governmentary coalition, and pushes democratic ideals while being popular with the younger, student generation, especially those at the American University of Beirut. The People's Movement opposes the economic policies of Rafik Hariri and his Future Movement and adopts radical alter-globalist, anti-American and anti-Israeli positions. The Movement is now part of the Lebanese opposition against the March 14 Alliance and is allied to Hezbollah, the Free Patriotic Movement, the Syrian Social Nationalist Party, the Lebanese Communist Party, the Marada Movement and several other smaller parties. The party's main ideas deal with the reformation of the Lebanese political system and strengthened relations between Arab countries.

== History ==
=== Najah Wakim and the Foundation of the Party ===
Najah Wakim is an Orthodox lawyer who was elected a member of parliament in 1972 at the age of twenty-six. He was a vocal critic of Rafik Hariri and strongly identified with the policies of Gamal Nasser. Wakim himself strongly believes in secularism, and his party evolved to bolster a non-sectarian style of government, contrary to the current government in Lebanon. A group of pan-Arab leftists including Wakim established the People's Movement as a result of the growing dissatisfaction with the current Lebanese government and foreign affairs.

=== The We Want Accountability Campaign ===
The People's Movement is tied to a political campaign called the "We Want Accountability" campaign. This campaign evolved out of the You Stink campaign in Lebanon, formed to fight the growing corruption in the government and the buildup of trash. The We Want Accountability campaign has recently carried out three protests. The first was in May 2016 outside the Central Inspection Department in Beirut. They protested corruption in the government and embezzlement of public governmental funds. The second rally was held in June 2016, protesting the privatization of Lebanon's last public beach in front of Beirut Municipality. The demonstration succeeded and the beach remains public to this day. The third and most recent protest occurred in September 2016. Protesters blocked the Grand Serail, rallying against political corruption.

== Political stances ==
=== Ideology ===
The People's Movement fights for peaceful, national unity in Lebanon. They idealize a government without religious boundaries, and free of corruption. The Movement considers things like embezzlement and bribery to be a big problem and would like to take measures against such forms of corruption. It attacks privatization and sectarianism. They rely on the middle and working classes banding together to abolish the "old" political class, and place a lot of importance on political reform and highlight how other reforms will follow. A popular mantra written on fliers of the movement reads,"للفساد، للطائفية، للجهل", literally meaning, "no to corruption, no to sectarianism, no to ignorance". Their movement reflects that of other People's Movements around the world.

=== Domestic policy ===
The People's Movement garners much of its support from the younger generation, thus the policies they would like to implement reflect that. They include placing pressure on the government to help relieve unemployment in the younger generation, granting access to soft loans to entrepreneurs with government supervision, stopping the immigration of intelligent people (the brain drain), and creating a planning ministry.

=== Foreign policy ===
The People's Movement is vehemently against relations with Israel and sympathizes with Palestine. It is against the call for peace with Zionists and fears Israel has its own agenda. The Movement focuses on peaceful relations with the Arabs and defense of the Palestinian cause, and they believe Israel solely wants to abolish Palestine. They refuse peace with Israel if Palestine is not granted its full respect as an independent country. They are also opposed to international interference in Lebanese politics, especially American interference.
