= Najah Wakim =

Lebanese politician

- نجاح واكيم
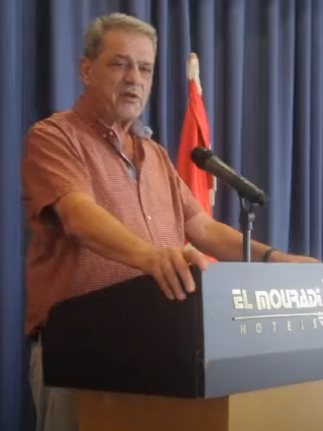
- Wakim in 2017

Member of the Lebanese Parliament
- In office 1972–2000
- Constituency: Beirut

Personal details
- Born: 1946 (age 79–80) Berbara, Lebanon
- Party: People's Movement
- Education: Beirut Arab University

Najah Wakim (Arabic: نجاح واكيم; born 1946 in Berbara) is a Lebanese politician who served as member of parliament from 1972 to 2000. He is the president of the People's Movement.

== Biography ==
He managed to defeat Nasim Majdalani in 1972's Lebanese parliamentary elections for the Orthodox seat, and was a supporter of Gamal Abdel Nasser. He was not involved in any military work during the Lebanese Civil War. However, several death threats were issued against him and several attempts were made on his life most notably on October 1, 1987. In 1982, he highly opposed the Israeli invasion of Beirut and voted against the Israeli-supported presidential candidate Bashir Gemayel. He rejected the 1989 Taif agreement claiming it is an American-Syrian agreement that only enhanced sectarianism in Lebanon. Wakim won the parliamentary elections in 1992 and in 1996. He boycotted the elections in 2000, opposing Syrian interference in Lebanese affairs. He is known for his very strict opposition of the whole Lebanese regime and sectarian leaders.

But in 1998 while in parliament, Wakim voted for the election of Pro-Syrian President Émile Lahoud. He maintains strong links to Lebanese pro-Syrian figures such as Lebanese Arab Socialist Ba'ath Party MP Assem Qanso.

In 1999, he founded "The People's Movement", a leftist group that calls for changes in the Lebanese political system and for better relationships between Arab countries. In 2001, his office was burned by arsonists who were not identified.

Najah Wakim was not involved in the pro-Syrian nor the anti-Syrian rallies in March 2005. However, after the Syrian withdrawal, he attacked the March 14 Alliance claiming that the Syrian interference has been replaced with an American invasion of Lebanon. Even though the 2005 elections held the election law of 2000, and with an Arab political position, he fought the 2005 elections alone against the Hariri-LF-Hezbollah allied list and lost. He also ran for the 2009 elections but lost against the sectarian allies in Beirut. In the current Lebanese political scandal, Najah Wakim is a strict supporter to Hezbollah's arms and a great opposer to the government, who is currently considered as pro-American by many Lebanese parties.

Najah Wakim is the author of three books: Al 'Alam Al Thalith Wal Thawra (The Third World and Revolution), Al Ayadi Al Sud (The Black Hands) which is a foray into the political corruption in Lebanon in the days of the prime minister Rafiq Al Hariri. The other book contains his speeches and essays and is called Al Wahm Wal Amal (Illusion and Hope). All three books are in Arabic.

In an interview with Aljadeed on 17.06.2020, he said his bank account contains 2,000,000 LBP(500 dollars back then). He is also paying installment checks to pay his debt which mounts to 6,000,000 LBP as he claims.

== Books ==
- Wakim, Najah (1982). Al 'Alam Al Thalith Wal Thawra. Beirut: Maʻhad al-Inmāʻ al-ʻArabī. OCLC 9974612.
- Wakim, Najah (1998). Al Ayadi Al Sud. Beirut: Sharikat al-Maṭbūʻāt lil-tawzīʻ wa-al-Nashr. OCLC 42397300.
- Wakim, Najah (2003). Al Wahm Wal Amal. Beirut: Dār al-Ādāb. OCLC 52443317.
