= Mary Queeny =

Lebanese actress and film producer (1913–2003)

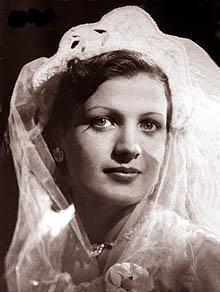
- Queeny c. 1945
- Born: Mary Boutros Younis; 1913; Tannourine, Lebanon
- Died: 2003 (aged 89–90); Cairo, Egypt
- Occupations: Actress; producer
- Years active: 1913–2003
- Spouse: Ahmed Galal
- Children: Nader Galal
- Relatives: Ahmed Nader Galal (grandson)

Mary Queeny (Arabic: ماري كويني; 1913–2003) is the stage name of Mary Boutros Younis, was a Lebanese-born Egyptian actress and film producer.

== Early life ==
Mary Boutros Younis was born in 1913 to a Lebanese Christian family in Lebanon. Her mother's cousin was Asaad Dagher, a writer and journalist at the Al-Ahram newspaper.

== Career ==
In 1923 Queeny moved to Cairo with her aunt, actress and film producer Assia Dagher, and started acting in 1929. Her first role was in 1929 in the film Ghadat al-sahara (The Desert Beauty), and she went on to star in all of her aunt's subsequent films.

Queeny became a popular actress and producer in a pioneering age of Egyptian cinema. She appeared in 20 films and was among the first women in Egypt to appear on screen without a veil.

Queeny married Ahmed Galal (1897-1947) in 1940. Until her retirement in 1982, she produced all of the films he directed. With her husband she founded Galal Films in 1942; in 1944 it became Galal Studios. During the Golden Age of Egyptian film, it was one of the five largest studios. The first films shot at the studios were Om al-Saad, Amirat al-Ahlam (Princess of Dreams) and 'Aoudat al-Gha'eb (The Return of the Departed). After her husband's sudden death in 1947, Queeny and her son, Nader Galal, continued to run the studios. The studios were later nationalised by the Nasser government.

In 1958 she established a film colour processing laboratory, which in 1963 she sold to the Misr Company (later Misr International), which was later acquired by Youssef Chahine and his niece, Marianne Khoury.

== Personal life and death ==
Film director Nader Galal is the son of Queeny and Ahmad Galal. Their grandson Ahmed Nader Galal is also a director.

Queeny died on 23 November 2003 in Cairo of a heart attack. She was 90.

== Selected filmography ==
=== Actress ===
- Ghadat al-sahara (1929)
- Pangs Of Conscience (1931)
- When A Woman Loves (1933)
- Rebellious Girl (1940)(in which she took her first leading role)
- Prisoner No 17 (1949)
- The Seventh Wife (1950)
- Sacrificing My Love (1951).
- Women Without Men (1953), the last in which she acted, directed by Youssef Chahine

=== Producer ===
- Dawn of a New Day (1965)
