= Vedat Örfi Bengü =

Turkish film producer and actor (1900–1953)

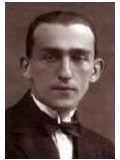
- Born: Wadad Orfi; October 14, 1900; Istanbul, Ottoman Empire
- Died: May 25, 1953 (aged 52); Istanbul, Turkey
- Other names: Wedad Orfi, Wadad Orfi,
- Occupation(s): Film producer, actor
- Years active: 1917-1953

Vedat Örfi Bengü, also spelt as Wedad Orfi, and Wadad Orfi, (October 14, 1900 – May 25, 1953) was a Turkish-Egyptian silent film producer and actor.

== Career ==
=== Controversy depicting Muhammad ===
In 1926, Örfi approached Youssef Wahbi to play the role of Muhammad in a film, which would be financed by the Turkish government and a German producer. Whilst the President of Turkey, Mustafa Kemal Atatürk, and the Istanbul Council of Ulamas gave their approval to the film, the Islamic Al-Azhar University in Cairo published a juridical decision stipulating that Islam forbids the representation of Muhammad and his companions. Thereafter, King Fouad warned Whabi that he would be exiled and stripped of his Egyptian citizenship if he took part in the film. Consequently, the film was later abandoned.

=== Leila/Layla – the first Egyptian feature film ===
By 1927 Örfi produced and starred in the film "Neda Allah" ("The Call of Allah") which was a collaborative project with Aziza Amir. The film was later remade and released as "Laila" ("Leila") with some of Orfi’s original shots left in the film. The latter production is often considered to be the first Egyptian feature film.

=== Filmography ===
==== In Egypt ====
- 1927: Laila
- 1928: The Victim / al-Dahiyyah
- 1929: The Beauty from the Desert / Ghaddat al-sahra
- 1929: The Drama of Life / Ma Sat al-Hayat

== Personal life ==
In the 1930s Örfi moved to Turkey.
